= Fin and flipper locomotion =

Method of animal locomotion

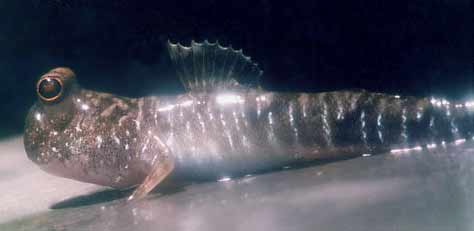
A species of mudskipper (Periophthalmus gracilis)

Fin and flipper locomotion occurs mostly in aquatic locomotion, (and rarely in terrestrial locomotion) of nektonic animals with paired appendages, more specifically aquatic vertebrates (fish and marine tetrapods) and most coleoids. These appendages have a large wetted area that interacts with water like paddles and/or hydrofoils to propel, steer and maintain postural control/balance of the body during locomotion. Some semi-aquatic animals with land-dwelling limbs also have webbed feet that are analogous to fins and flippers.

While most aquatic animals utilize body-caudal, flagellal and/or jet propulsion for locomotion in water, some rely on flapping movements of paired appendages — particularly the pair towards the front of the body — to generate propulsion and lift. Ray-finned fish have thin, folding fan-like pectoral fins that have a high thrust-to-weight ratio and can readily change shape and surface area, while batomorph cartilaginous fish (rays and skates) and aquatic tetrapods such as cetaceans, sirenians, pinnipeds and sea turtles have more bulky and rigid fins, flippers and flukes that they use for propulsion.

Some benthic fish such as handfish, frogfish, flying gurnard, epaulette shark, lungfish and likely the prehistoric tetrapodomorph sarcopterygians (ancestral stem tetrapods) use their paired fins (especially the pelvic fins) for crawling at the seafloor and streambeds, earning them a reputation as "walking fish". Many amphibious fish such as mudskippers, leaping blenny and walking catfish can also ambulate out of water by limb-like movements of their paired fins aided by body-tail propulsion, while flippers are routinely also used for terrestrial locomotion by sea turtles, pinnipeds and penguins, who rely on marine habitats for foraging food but have to return to dry land for sleeping and nesting or for reproduction and nurturing hatchlings/juveniles.

== Aquatic locomotion with fins and flippers ==
=== Aquatic locomotion of fish ===
Fish live in fresh or saltwater habitats and some exceptions are capable of coming on land (mudskippers). Most fish have muscles arranged in a row of segments called myomeres, along each side of the body. To swim, they alternately contract one side and relax the other side in a progression which goes from the head to the tail. In this way, an undulatory locomotion results, first bending the body one way in a wave which travels down the body, and then back the other way, with the contracting and relaxing muscles switching roles. They use their fins to propel themselves through the water in this swimming motion. Actinopterygians, the ray-finned fish show an evolutionary pattern of fine control ability to control the dorsal and ventral lobe of the caudal fin. Through developmental changes, intrinsic caudal muscles were added, which enable fish to exhibit such complex maneuvers such as control during acceleration, braking and backing. Studies have shown that the muscles in the caudal fin, have independent activity patterns from the myotomal musculature. These results show specific kinematic roles for different part of the fish's musculature. A curious example of fish adaption is the ocean sunfish, Mola mola. These fish have undergone significant developmental changes reducing their spinal cord, giving them a disk like appearance, and forming two very large fins for propulsion.

=== Aquatic locomotion of marine mammals ===
Swimming mammals, such as whales, dolphins, and seals, use their flippers to move forward through the water column. During swimming sea lions have a thrust phase, which lasts about 60% of the full cycle, and the recovery phase lasts the remaining 40%. A full cycle duration lasts about 0.5 to 1.0 seconds. Changing direction is a very rapid maneuver that is initiated by head movement towards the back of the animal that is followed by a spiral turn with the body. Due to their pectoral flippers being so closely located to their center of gravity, sea lions are capable of displaying astounding maneuverability in the pitch, roll, and yaw direction and are therefore not constrained, turning stochastically as they please. It is hypothesized that the increased level of maneuverability is caused by their complex habitat. Hunting occurs in difficult environments containing rocky inshore/kelp forest communities, with many niches for prey to hide, therefore requiring speed and maneuverability for capture. The complex skills of a sea lion are learned early on in ontogeny and most are perfected by the time the pups reach one year. Whales and dolphins are less maneuverable and more constrained in their movements. However, dolphins are capable of accelerating as fast as sea lions, but they are not capable of turning as quickly and as efficiently. For both whales and dolphins, their center of gravity does not line up with their pectoral flippers in a straight line, causing a much more rigid and stable swimming pattern.

=== Aquatic locomotion of marine reptiles ===
Aquatic reptiles such as sea turtles predominantly use their pectoral flippers to propulse through the water and their pelvic flippers for maneuvering. During swimming they move their pectoral flippers in a clapping motion underneath their body and pull them back up into an airplane position, causing forward motion. During the swimming motion, they rotate their front flipper to decrease drag through the water and hence increase their efficiency. Sea turtles exhibit a natural suite of behavior skills that help them direct themselves towards the ocean as well as identify the transition from sand to water after hatching. If rotated in the pitch, yaw or roll direction the hatchlings are capable of counteracting the forces acting upon them by correcting with either their pectoral or pelvic flippers and redirecting themselves towards the open ocean.

== Terrestrial locomotion ==
=== Terrestrial locomotion of fish ===
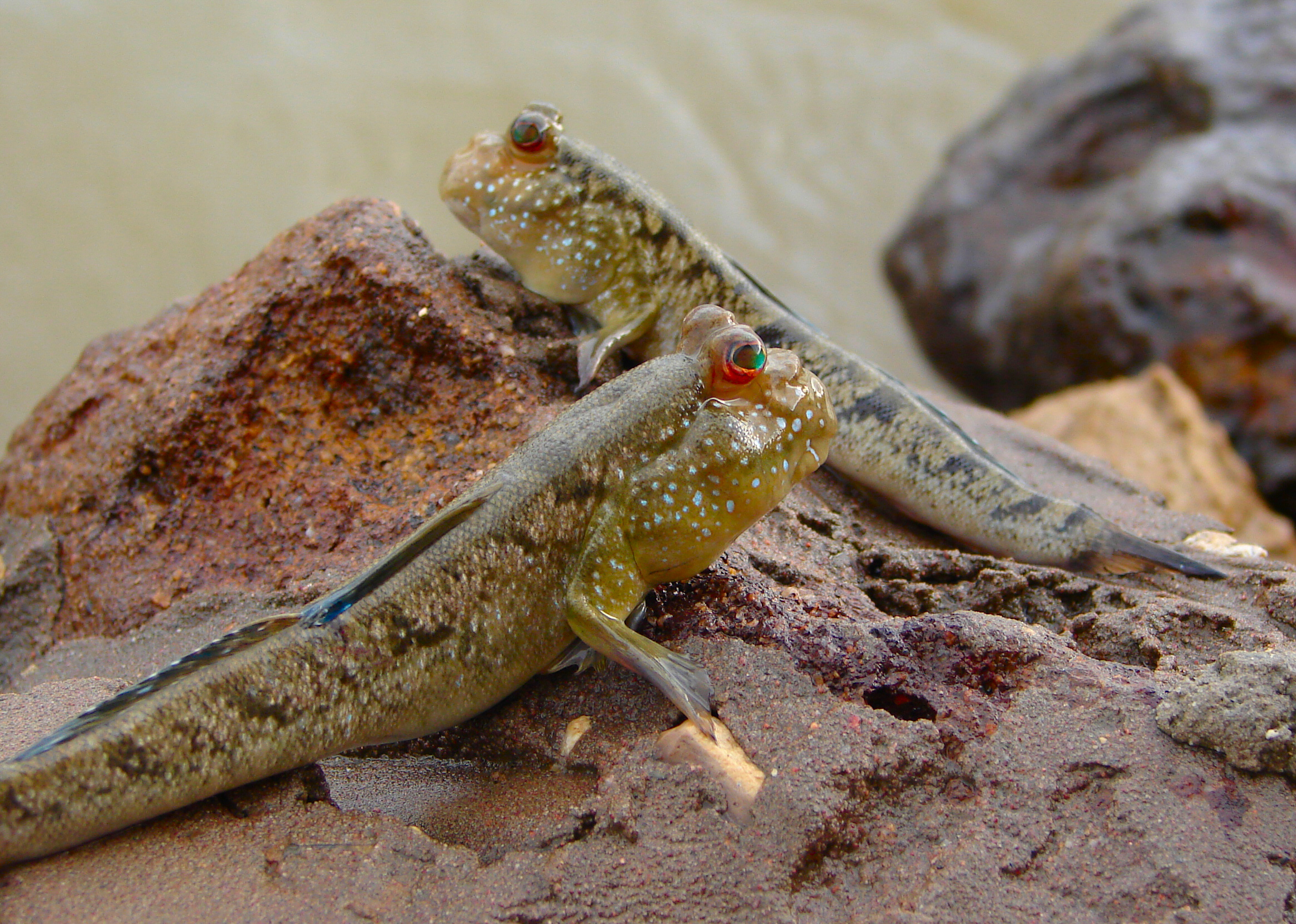
Mudskippers in The Gambia

Terrestrial locomotion poses new obstacles such as gravity and new media, including sand, mud, twigs, logs, debris, grass and many more. Fins and flippers are aquatically adapted appendages and typically aren't very useful in such an environment. It could be hypothesized that fish would try to "swim" on land, but studies have shown that some fish evolved to cope with the terrestrial environment. Mudskippers, for example demonstrate a 'crutching' gait which enables them to 'walk' over muddy surfaces as well as dig burrows to hide in. Mudskippers are also able to jump up to 3 cm distances. This behavior is described as starting with a J-curvature of the body at about 2/3 of its body length (with its tail wrapped towards the head), followed by a straightening of their body which propulses them like a projectile through the air.

=== Terrestrial locomotion of marine reptiles ===
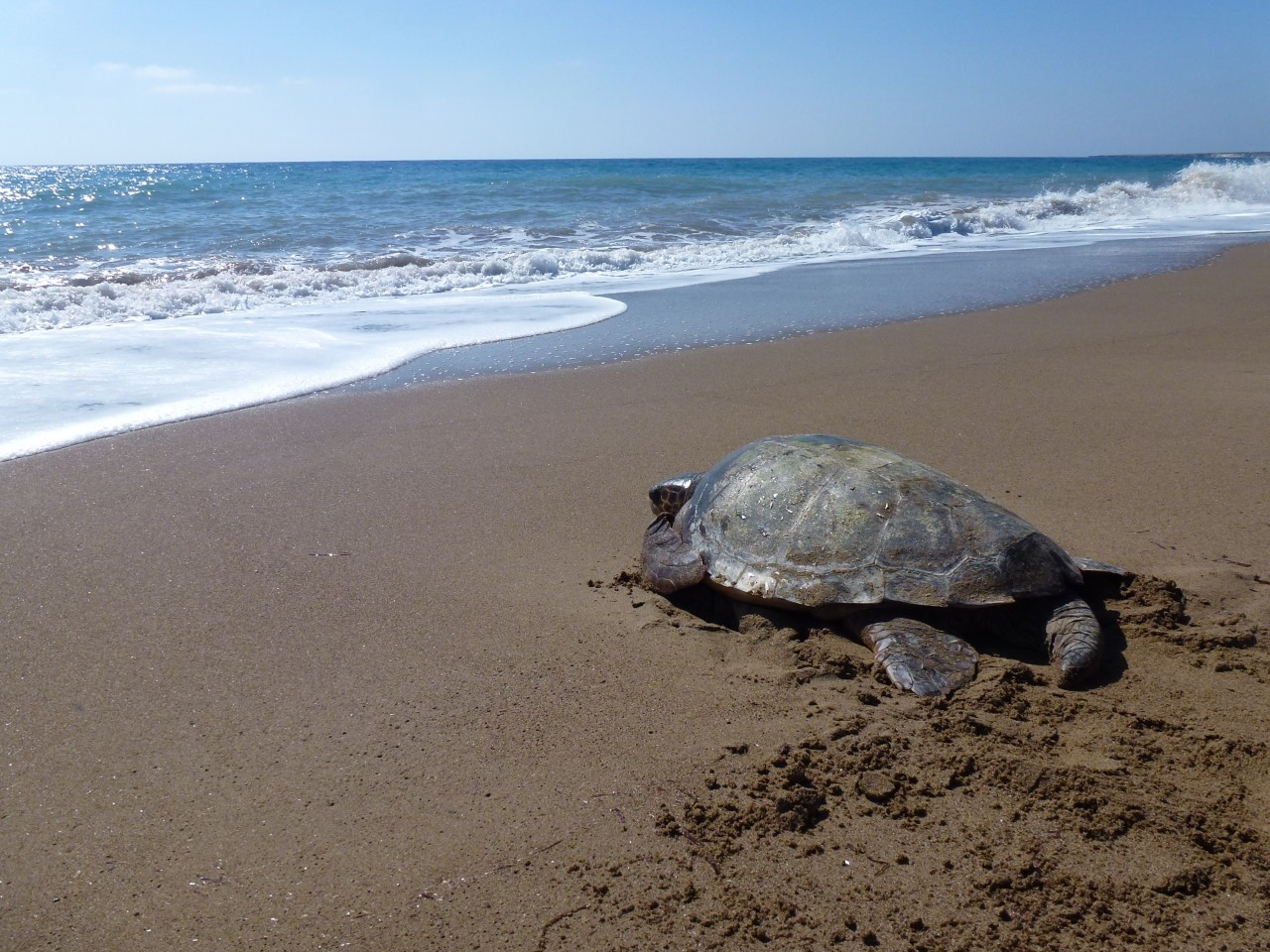
Loggerhead sea turtle crawling

Reptiles, such as sea turtles spend most of their lives in the ocean. However, their life cycle requires the females to come on shore and lay their nests on the beach. Consequently, the hatchlings emerge from the sand and have to run toward the water. Depending on their species, sea turtles are described to have either a symmetrical gait (diagonally opposite limbs are moving together) or an asymmetrical gait (Contra-lateral limbs move together).

== See also ==
- Animal locomotion
- Kinematics
- Terrestrial locomotion
