= Outline of fish =

Overview of and topical guide to fish

The following outline is provided as an overview of and topical guide to fish:

Fish – any member of a paraphyletic group of organisms that consist of all gill-bearing aquatic craniate animals that lack limbs with digits. Included in this definition are the living hagfish, lampreys, and cartilaginous and bony fish, as well as various extinct related groups. Most fish are ectothermic ("cold-blooded"), allowing their body temperatures to vary as ambient temperatures change, though some of the large active swimmers like white shark and tuna can hold a higher core temperature. Fish are abundant in most bodies of water. They can be found in nearly all aquatic environments, from high mountain streams (e.g., char and gudgeon) to the abyssal and even hadal depths of the deepest oceans (e.g., cusk-eel and snailfish). At 32,000 species, fish exhibit greater species diversity than any other group of vertebrates.

== What type of things are fish? ==
Fish can be described as all of the following:

- Natural resource – Resources that exist without actions of humankind
  - Organism – Individual living life forms
    - Animal – Biological kingdoms
      - Vertebrate – Subphylum of chordatess
    - Seafood – Marine life regarded as food by humans

== Types of fish ==
- List of fish common names – List of common names used to refer to fish
- List of fish families
- Predatory fish – Hypercarnivorous fish that sometimes actively prey upon other fish
  - billfish – Group of ray-finned fishes
  - mackerel – Pelagic fish
  - salmon – Commercially important migratory fish
  - shark – Predatory cartilaginous fisheses
  - tuna – Tribe of fish
- Forage fish – Small prey fish
  - anchovy – Family of fishes
  - herring – Forage fish, mostly belonging to the family Clupeidae
  - sardine – Common name for various small, oily forage fish
- Demersal fish – Fish that live and feed on or near the bottom of seas or lakes
  - cod – Common name for several fish, but mainly the demersal genus Gadus
  - flatfish – Suborder of fishes
  - pollock – North Atlantic marine fish in the genus Pollachius
  - rays – Division of cartilaginous fishes
- Other types
  - Aquarium fish
  - Bait fish – Fish used as bait to attract predatory fish
  - Coarse fish – Rough fish
  - Farmed fish – Fish raised commercially in enclosures
  - Game fish – Popular fish targeted in recreational fishing
  - Oily fish – Fish species with oils in their tissues and coelom
  - Rough fish – Fish considered less desirable to some anglers
  - Whitefish – Several species of demersal fish with fins

== History of fish ==
- History of fishing

=== Evolution of fish ===
- Prehistoric fish

== Fish biology ==
- Ichthyology
  - Ichthyology terms
  - Ethnoichthyology
- Diversity of fish

=== Fish anatomy ===
Fish anatomy

- Ampullae of Lorenzini
- Anguilliformity
- Barbel
- Dorsal fin
- Electroreception
- Gill
- Gill raker
- Gill slit
- Glossohyal
- Hyomandibula
- Lateral line
- Leydig's organ
- Mauthner cell
- Otolith
- Operculum
- Pharyngeal teeth
- Photophore
- Pseudobranch
- Scales
- Shark cartilage
- Shark tooth
- Swim bladder
- Vision
- Weberian apparatus

=== Fish reproduction ===
Fish reproduction – Reproductive physiology of fishes

- Bubble nest – Nest built by some fish and frog species to protect their eggs
- Clasper – Male anatomical structure found in some groups of animals, used in mating
- Egg case – Natural collagen casing found encompassing some aquatic lifeforms' fertilized eggs
- Fish development
- Ichthyoplankton – Eggs and larvae of fish that drift in the water column
- Milt – Fish seminal fluid and sacs
- Mouthbrooder – Animal that cares for its offspring by holding them its mouth
- Roe – Egg masses of fish and seafood
- Spawning – Eggs and sperm released into water
- Spawning trigger – Environmental cues that cause marine animals to breed

=== Fish locomotion ===
Fish locomotion

- Fin and flipper locomotion
- Amphibious fish
- Walking fish
- Flying fish
- Undulatory locomotion

=== Fish behavior ===
- Aquatic predation
- Bait ball
- Bottom feeders
- Cleaner fish
- Diel vertical migration
- Electric fish
- Filter feeders
- Forage fish
- Hallucinogenic fish
- Migrating fish
- Paedophagy
- Pain in fish
- Predatory fish
- Salmon run
- Sardine run
- Scale eaters
- Schooling fish
- Venomous fish

=== Fish habitats ===
- Coastal fish
- Coldwater fish
- Coral reef fish
- Deep sea fish
- Demersal fish
- Freshwater fish
- Groundfish
- Marine habitats
- Pelagic fish
- Tropical fish
- Wild fish

== Fish as a resource ==
- Natural resource
- Fish as food
- Fish farming
  - Aquaculture
- Fishing industry
  - Fisheries
  - Fishing

=== Fish conservation ===
Fish conservation

- Overfishing
- Habitat destruction
  - Environmental effects of fishing

=== Fish-related recreation ===
- Fishkeeping
- Recreational fishing
  - Angling

== Fish-related organizations ==
- American Society of Ichthyologists and Herpetologists
- Gilbert Ichthyological Society
- Ichthyological Society of Hong Kong
- National Fish Habitat Initiative
- North American Native Fishes Association

== Fish-related publications ==
- Fishes of the World

== People influential in relation to fish ==
- Jacques Cousteau
- William Beebe
- Edwin Philip Pister
- Carl Leavitt Hubbs
- David Starr Jordan
- Louis Agassiz
- Robert Rush Miller
- Wendell L. Minckley

== See also ==
- Public aquarium
- Aquarium
- Catch and release
- Deep sea fish
- Digital Fish Library
- Fish development
- Fishkeeping
- Forage fish
- Ichthyology
- Marine biology
- Marine vertebrates
- Fear of fish
- Fish kill
- FishBase
- Genetically modified fish
- Schreckstoff
