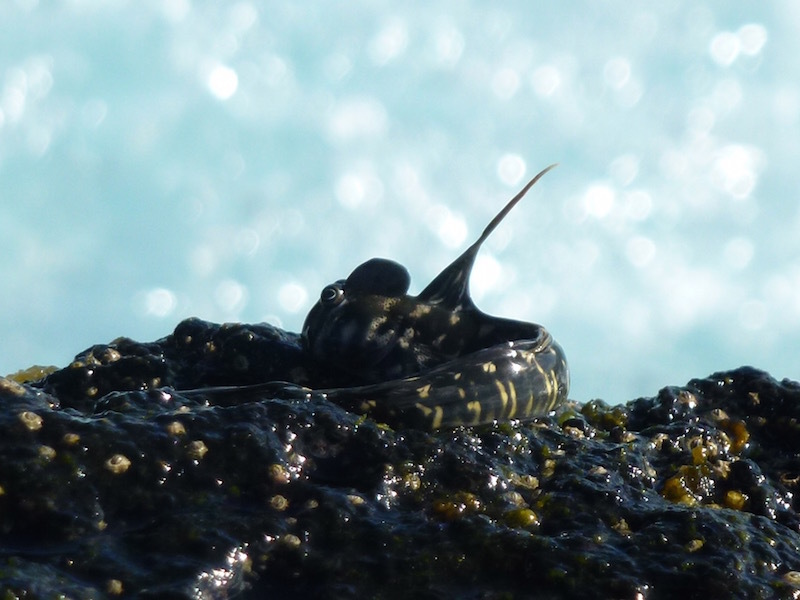
- Male with elongated rays of the dorsal fin

Conservation status
- Least Concern (IUCN 3.1)

Scientific classification
- Kingdom: Animalia
- Phylum: Chordata
- Class: Actinopterygii
- Division: Teleostei
- Order: Blenniiformes
- Family: Blenniidae
- Genus: Alticus
- Species: A. monochrus

Binomial name
- Alticus monochrus Bleeker, 1869

Synonyms
- Alticus aspilus Bleeker, 1869; Damania monochrus (Bleeker, 1869); Salarias monochrus (Bleeker, 1869)

= Alticus monochrus =

Species of fish

The Mascarene Combtooth Blenny (Alticus monochrus), is a species of combtooth blenny (family Blenniidae) in the genus Alticus. It is a tropical blenny found in the western Indian Ocean including the Comoros Mozambique, Madagascar, the Seychelles and the Mascarene Islands. It can reach a maximum total length of 10 centimetres (3.94 inches). The blennies feed primarily off of benthic algae. They are oviparous.

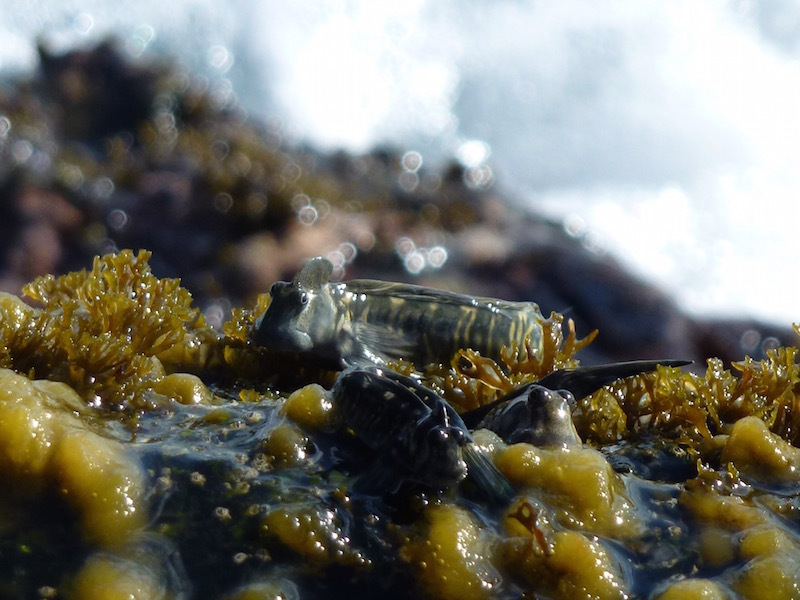
Alticus monochrus observed in Mauritius
