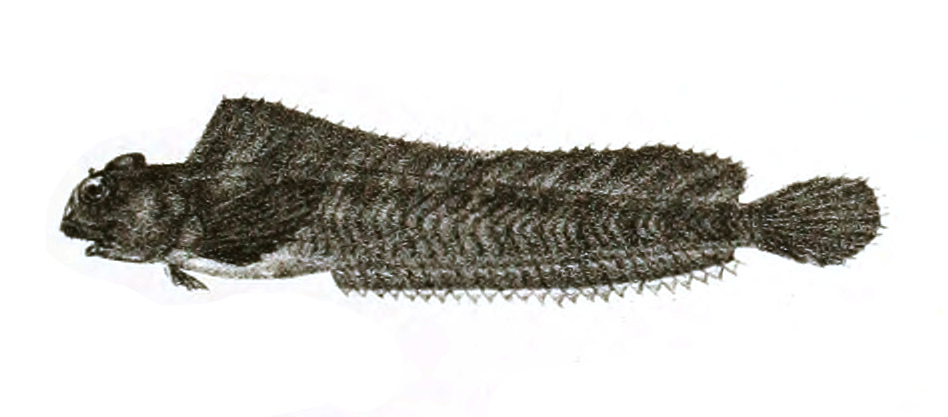

Conservation status
- Least Concern (IUCN 3.1) (Global)

- Vulnerable (IUCN 3.1) (Persian Gulf)

Scientific classification
- Kingdom: Animalia
- Phylum: Chordata
- Class: Actinopterygii
- Division: Teleostei
- Order: Blenniiformes
- Family: Blenniidae
- Genus: Alticus
- Species: A. kirkii

Binomial name
- Alticus kirkii (Günther, 1868)

Synonyms
- Alticus kirkii magnusi (Klausewitz, 1964); Lophalticus kirki (Günther, 1868); Lophalticus kirkii magnusi Klausewitz, 1964; Salarias kirkii Günther, 1868

= Kirk's blenny =

Species of fish

The Kirk's blenny (Alticus kirkii) is a species of combtooth blenny (family Blenniidae) in the genus Alticus. It was described by A. Günther in 1964, originally as a member of the genus Salarias. It is a tropical blenny which is known from the Red Sea, Mozambique, Réunion, the Persian Gulf, and India, in the Indian Ocean. Kirk's blennies inhabit waters near the shore, and often spend time out of the water. They are able to breathe air when on land. They are oviparous, and form distinct pairs when mating; they also guard their eggs.

== Size ==
They can reach a maximum total length of 11 centimetres (4.33 inches), and feed primarily off of benthic algae.

== Etymology ==
The common name and the specific name honour the Scottish doctor, naturalist and explorer John Kirk (1832–1922) who collected the type of this species and gave it to the British Museum (Natural History).
