= Alticus =

- Alticus arnoldorum hopping

Scientific classification
- Kingdom: Animalia
- Phylum: Chordata
- Class: Actinopterygii
- Division: Teleostei
- Order: Blenniiformes
- Family: Blenniidae
- Subfamily: Salariinae
- Genus: Alticus; Lacépède, 1800

Type species
- Blennius saliens Lacépède, 1800

Synonyms
- Rupiscartes Swainson, 1839; Damania Smith, 1959

Genus of fishes

Alticus is a genus of combtooth blennies found in the Pacific and Indian oceans. It is one of 57 genera in the family Blenniidae.

== Species ==
There are currently ten recognized species in this genus:

- Alticus anjouanae (Fourmanoir, 1955)
- Alticus arnoldorum (Curtiss, 1938) (Pacific leaping blenny)
- Alticus kirkii (Günther, 1868) (Kirk's blenny)
- Alticus magnusi (Klausewitz, 1964)
- Alticus monochrus Bleeker, 1869
- Alticus montanoi (Sauvage, 1880)
- Alticus orientalis Tomiyama, 1955
- Alticus saliens (J. R. Forster, 1788) (Leaping blenny)
- Alticus sertatus (Garman, 1903)
- Alticus simplicirrus Smith-Vaniz & V. G. Springer, 1971 (Marquesan rockstripper)
