= Alticus montanoi =

Conservation status
- Least Concern (IUCN 3.1)

Scientific classification
- Kingdom: Animalia
- Phylum: Chordata
- Class: Actinopterygii
- Division: Teleostei
- Order: Blenniiformes
- Family: Blenniidae
- Genus: Alticus
- Species: A. montanoi

Binomial name
- Alticus montanoi (Sauvage, 1880)

Synonyms
- Salarias montanoi Sauvage, 1880

Species of fish

Alticus montanoi, Montano's rockskipper, is a species of combtooth blenny (family Blenniidae). It is a tropical blenny, and is known from the western Pacific Ocean, from around the Philippines northwards to Japan. It lives in the intertidal zone of exposed rocky shores and is often out of the water. The blennies are oviparous, and form distinct pairs when mating. They feed primarily off of benthic algae.

== Etymology ==
The specific name honors the collector of the type, the French ethnologist Joseph Montaro.
