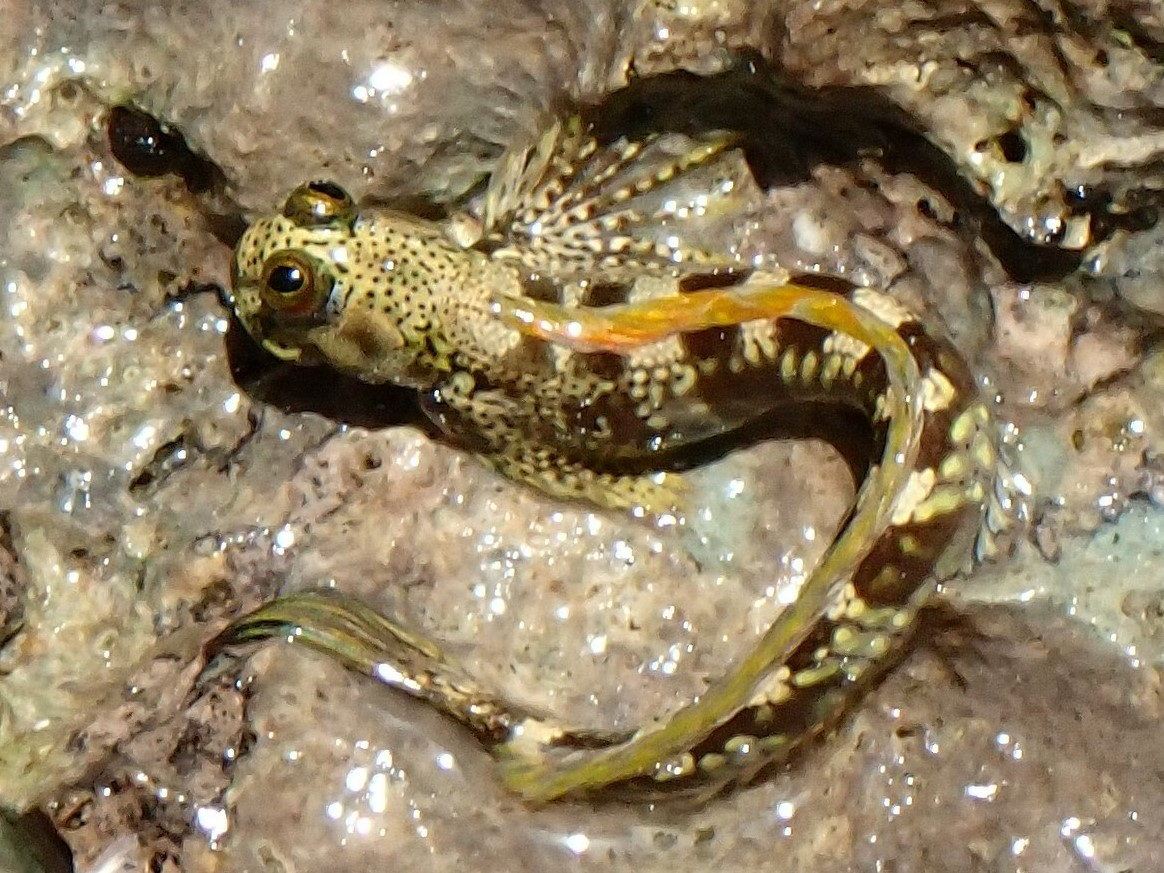

Conservation status
- Least Concern (IUCN 3.1)

Scientific classification
- Kingdom: Animalia
- Phylum: Chordata
- Class: Actinopterygii
- Order: Blenniiformes
- Family: Blenniidae
- Genus: Alticus
- Species: A. sertatus

Binomial name
- Alticus sertatus (Garman, 1903)

Synonyms
- Salarias sertatus Garman, 1903

= Alticus sertatus =

Species of fish

Alticus sertatus is a species of combtooth blenny found in coral reefs in the western central Pacific Ocean around the islands of Fiji and Tonga.
