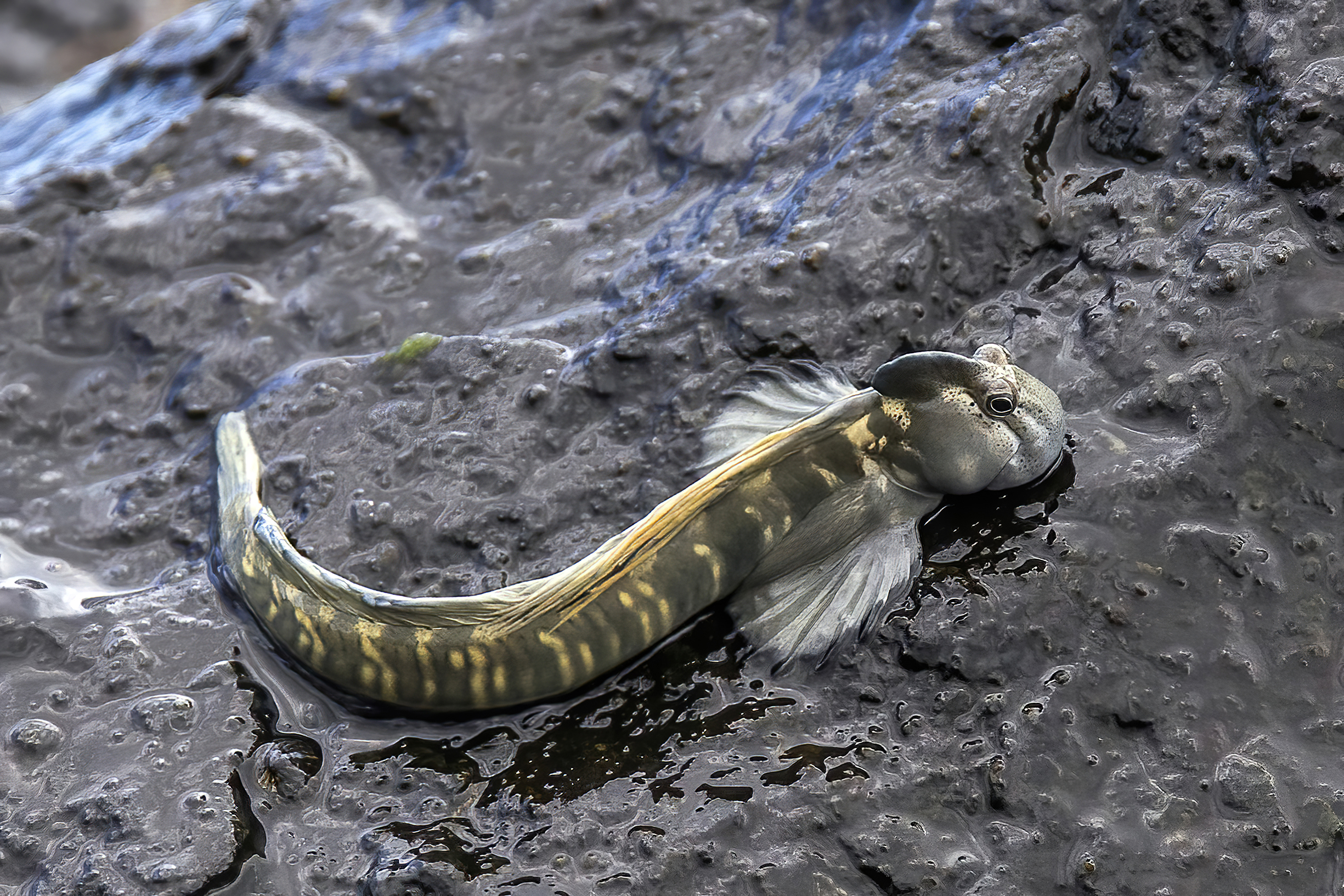
- Trois-Bassins, La Réunion

Conservation status
- Least Concern (IUCN 3.1)

Scientific classification
- Kingdom: Animalia
- Phylum: Chordata
- Class: Actinopterygii
- Order: Blenniiformes
- Family: Blenniidae
- Genus: Alticus
- Species: A. anjouanae

Binomial name
- Alticus anjouanae (Fourmanoir, 1955)

Synonyms
- Andamia anjouanae Fourmanoir, 1955; Damania anjouanae (Fourmanoir, 1955)

= Alticus anjouanae =

Species of combtooth blenny in the family Blenniidae

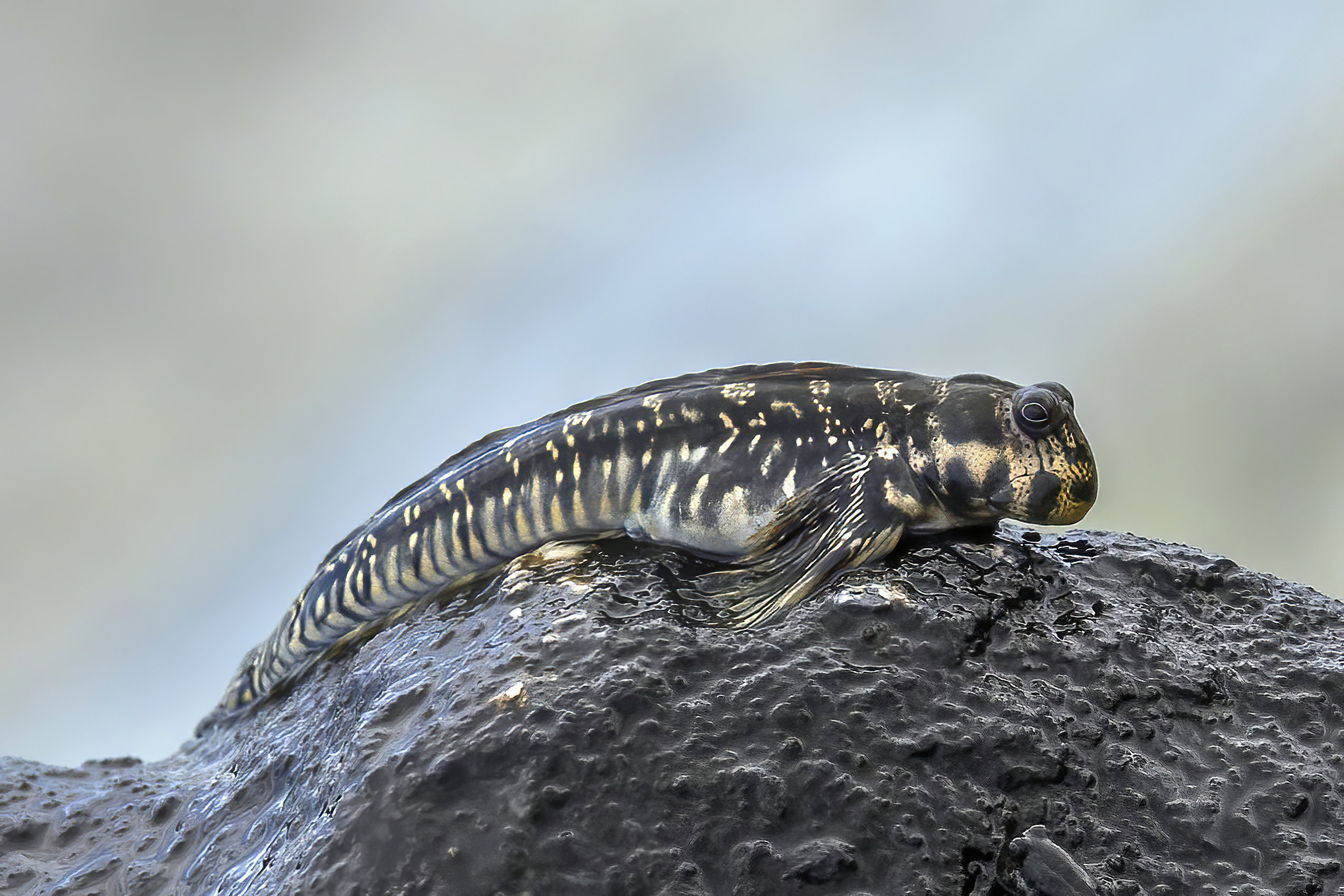

Alticus anjouanae is a species of combtooth blenny (family Blenniidae) in the genus Alticus. Fourmanoir originally placed this species in the genus Andamia. It is a tropical blenny known from Comoros, Seychelles, and Réunion, in the western Indian Ocean. Males can reach a maximum total length of 7.6 centimetres (2.99 inches). Blennies in this species are oviparous and form distinct pairs when mating. They feed primarily off of benthic algae and weeds.
