= Alticus simplicirrus =

Conservation status
- Least Concern (IUCN 3.1)

Scientific classification
- Kingdom: Animalia
- Phylum: Chordata
- Class: Actinopterygii
- Order: Blenniiformes
- Family: Blenniidae
- Genus: Alticus
- Species: A. simplicirrus

Binomial name
- Alticus simplicirrus Smith-Vaniz & V. G. Springer, 1971

Species of fish

Alticus simplicirrus, the Marquesan rockstripper, is a species of combtooth blenny found in the central Pacific Ocean, around the Marquesas Islands. This species reaches a length of 3.7 centimetres (1.5 in) SL.

A population of blennies of this or a related species on Rarotonga has evolved to become largely terrestrial, apparently at least in part as a way of avoiding marine predators.
