= Amphibious fish =

Fish that can leave water for periods of time

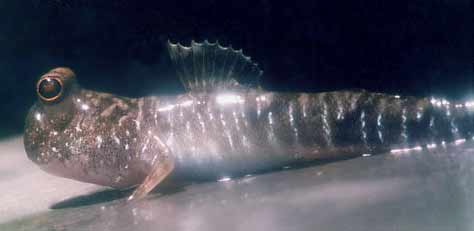
Mudskippers (Periophthalmus gracilis shown) are among the most land adapted of fish (excepting, from a cladistic perspective, tetrapods), able to spend days out of water.

Amphibious fish are fish that are able to leave water for extended periods of time. About 11 distantly related genera of fish are considered amphibious. This suggests that many fish genera independently evolved amphibious traits, a process known as convergent evolution. These fish use a range of methods for land movement, such as lateral undulation, tripod-like walking (using paired fins and tail), and jumping. Many of these methods of locomotion incorporate multiple combinations of pectoral-, pelvic-, and tail-fin movement.

Many ancient fish had lung-like organs, and a few, such as the lungfish and bichir, still do. Some of these ancient "lunged" fish were the ancestors of tetrapods. In most recent fish species, though, these organs evolved into the swim bladders, which help control buoyancy. Having no lung-like organs, modern amphibious fish and many fish in oxygen-poor water use other methods, such as their gills or their skin to breathe air. Amphibious fish may also have eyes adapted to allow them to see clearly in air, despite the refractive index differences between air and water.

== List of amphibious fish ==
=== Lung breathers ===
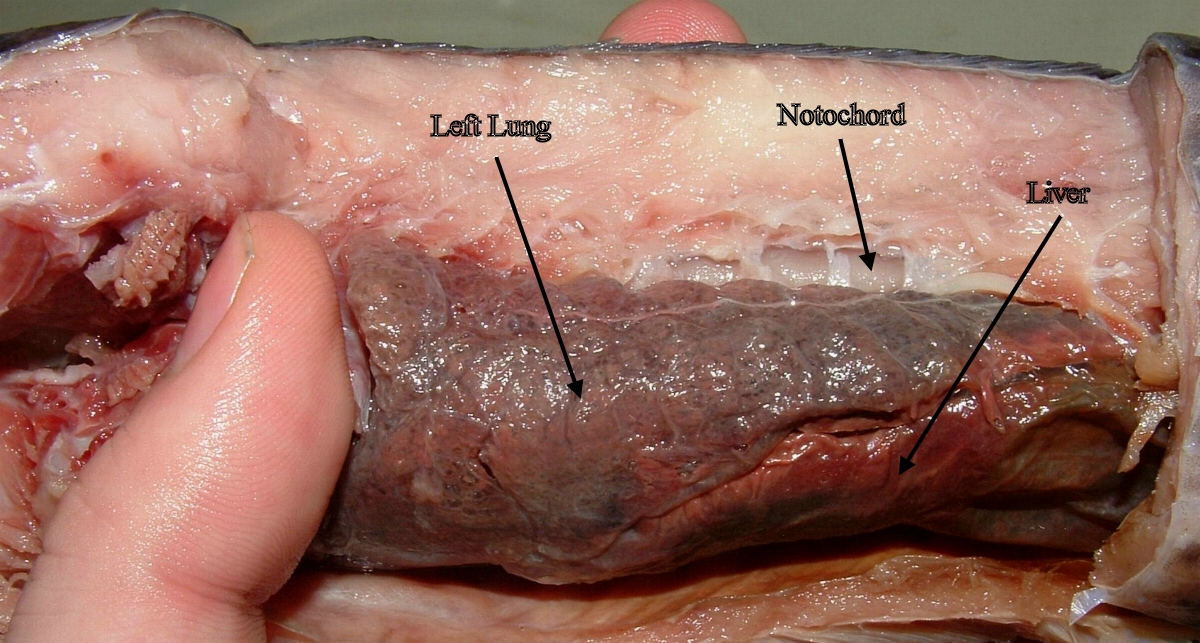
- Lateral view of lungs of a dissected spotted lungfish (Protopterus dolloi)
  Lungfish (Dipnoi): Six species have limb-like fins, and can breathe air. Some are obligate air breathers, meaning they will drown if not given access to air to breathe. All but one species bury in the mud when the body of water they live in dries up, surviving up to two years until water returns.
- Bichir (Polypteridae): These 12 species are the only ray-finned fish to retain lungs. They are facultative air breathers, requiring access to surface air to breathe in poorly oxygenated water.
- Various other "lunged" fish: now extinct, a few of this group were ancestors of the stem tetrapods that led to all tetrapods: Lissamphibia, sauropsids and mammals.

=== Gill or skin breathers ===
- Rockskippers: These blennies are found on islands in the Indian and Pacific Oceans. They come onto land to catch prey and escape aquatic predators, often for 20 minutes or more. Leaping blennies (Alticus arnoldorum) are able to jump over land using their tails. On Rarotonga, one species has evolved to become largely terrestrial.
- Woolly sculpin (Clinocottus analis): Found in tide pools along the Pacific Coast of North America, these sculpins leave water if the oxygen levels get low, and they can breathe air.
- Mudskippers (Oxudercinae): This subfamily of gobies is probably the most land-adapted of fish. Mudskippers are found in mangrove swamps in Africa and the Indo-Pacific; they frequently come onto land, and can survive in air for up to 3-1/2 days. Mudskippers breathe through their skin and through the lining of the mouth (the mucosa) and throat (the pharynx). This requires the mudskipper to be wet, limiting them to humid habitats. This mode of breathing, similar to that employed by amphibians, is known as cutaneous breathing. They propel themselves over land on their sturdy fore fins. Some of them are also able to climb trees and skip atop the surface of the water.
- Mangrove killifish (Mangrove rivulus): It can survive for about two months on land, where it breathes through its skin.
- Eels: Some eels, such as the European eel and the American eel, can live for an extended time out of water and can also crawl on land if the soil is moist. The moray Echidna catenata sometimes leaves the water to forage.
- Swamp eels, which are not true eels, can absorb oxygen through their highly vascularized mouths and pharynges, and in some cases (e.g., Monopterus rongsaw) through their skin.
- Snakehead fish (Channidae): This family of fish consists of obligate air breathers, using their suprabranchial organs, which are a primitive labyrinth organ. The northern snakehead of Eastern Asia can "walk" on land by wriggling and using its pectoral fins, which allows it to move between the slow-moving, and often stagnant and temporary bodies of water in which it lives.

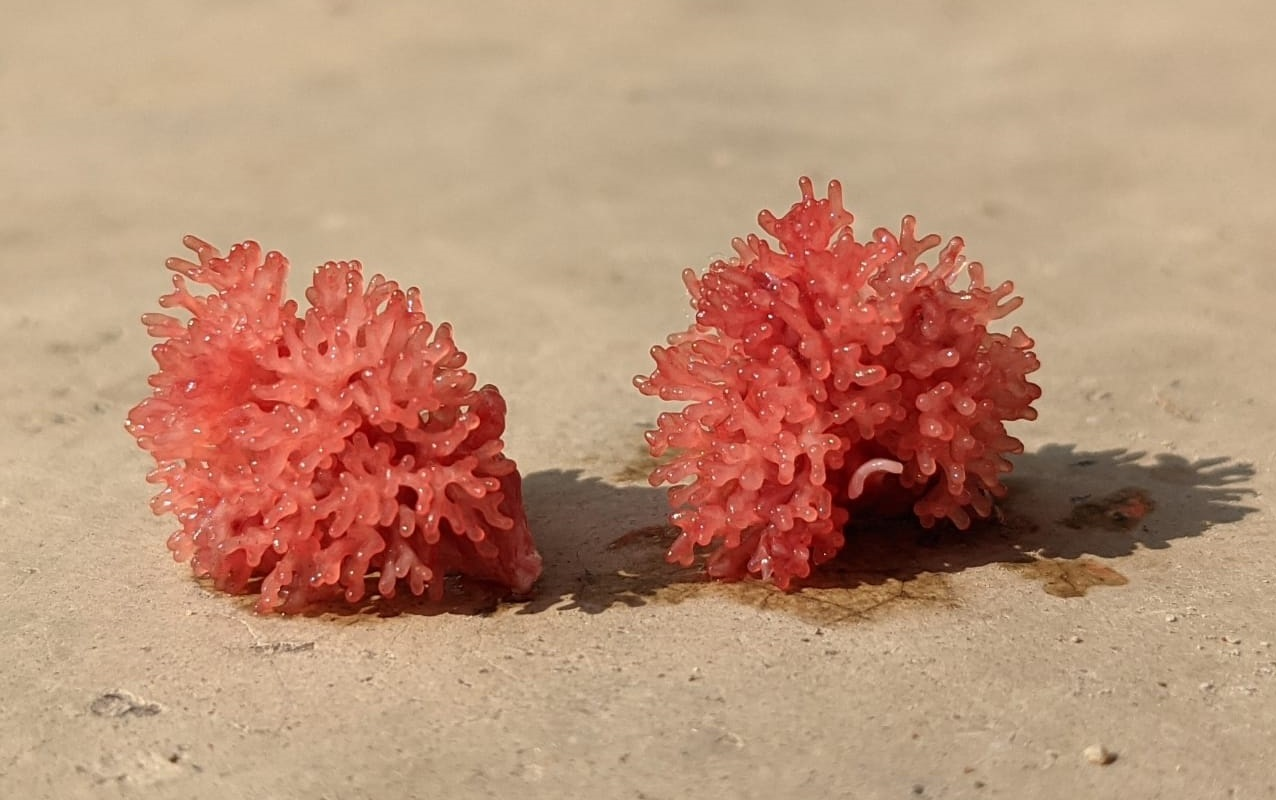
Air breathing organ of a walking catfish

- Airbreathing catfish (Clariidae): Amphibious species of this family may venture onto land in wet weather, such as the eel catfish (Channallabes apus), which lives in swamps in Africa, and is known to hunt beetles on land.

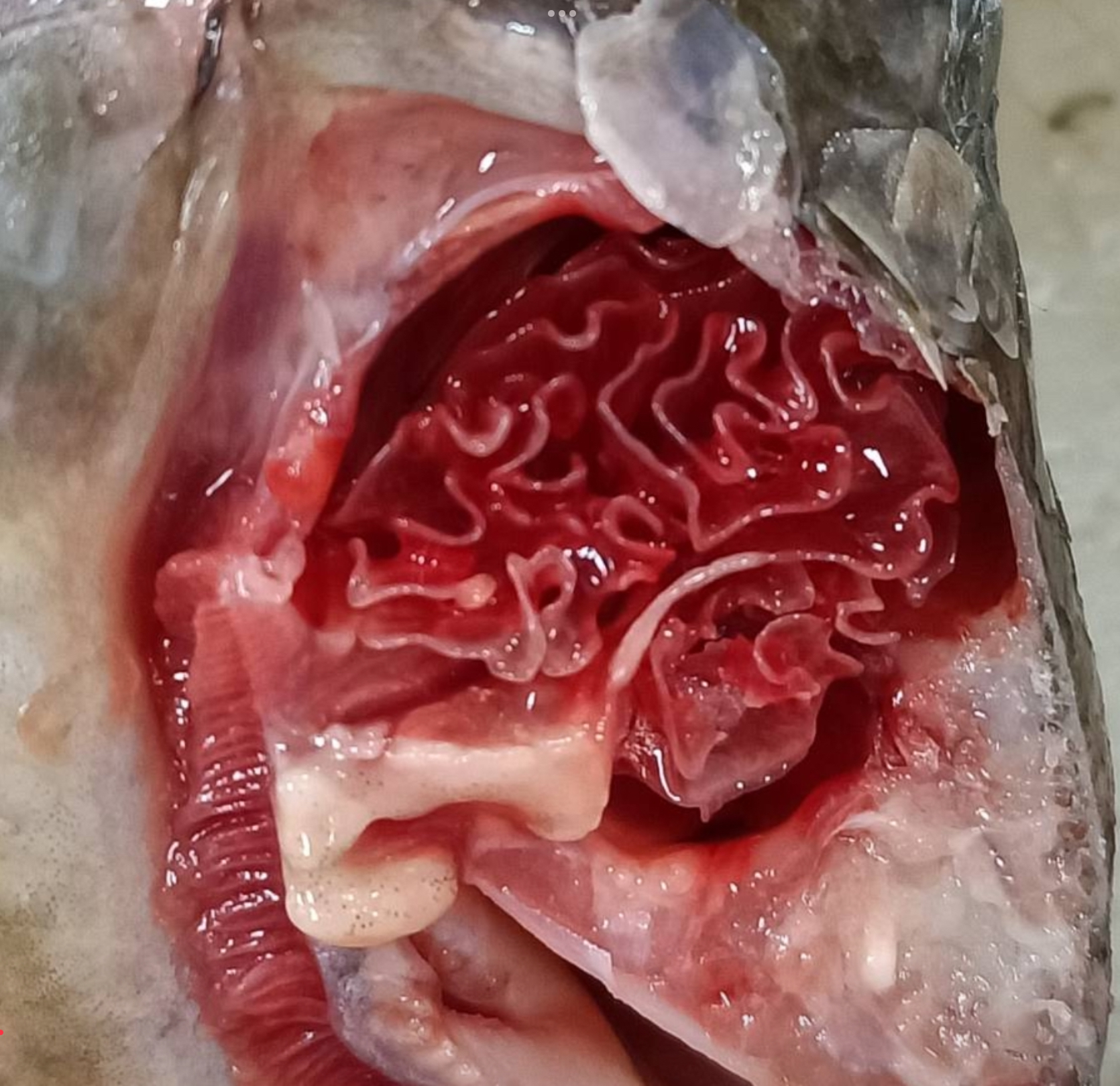
Labyrinth organ of a climbing perch (Anabas testudineus)

- Labyrinth fish (Anabantoidei). This suborder of fish also use a labyrinth organ to breathe air. Some species from this group can move on land. Amphibious fish from this family are the climbing perches, African and Southeast Asian fish that are capable of moving from pool to pool over land by using their pectoral fins, caudal peduncle, and gill covers as a means of locomotion. Climbing gourami are said to move at night in groups.
- Arapaima are obligate airbreathers that breathe air through a modified swim-bladder.
- Knifefish: (Gymnotiformes) some species of Gymnotiformes, otherwise known as the knifefish, are obligate oxygen breathers that require resurfacing in order to survive, such as Electrophorus electricus and Gymnotus carapo, the latter of which uses an "esophageal force pump" to siphon air into its lungs for gas exchange.

== See also ==
- Airbreathing catfish
- Axolotl, colloquially known as a "walking fish"; it is not a fish, but a salamander, a type of amphibian.
- Eel catfish
- Evolution of fish
- Lungfish
- Mudskipper
- Snakehead (fish)
- Walking fish
