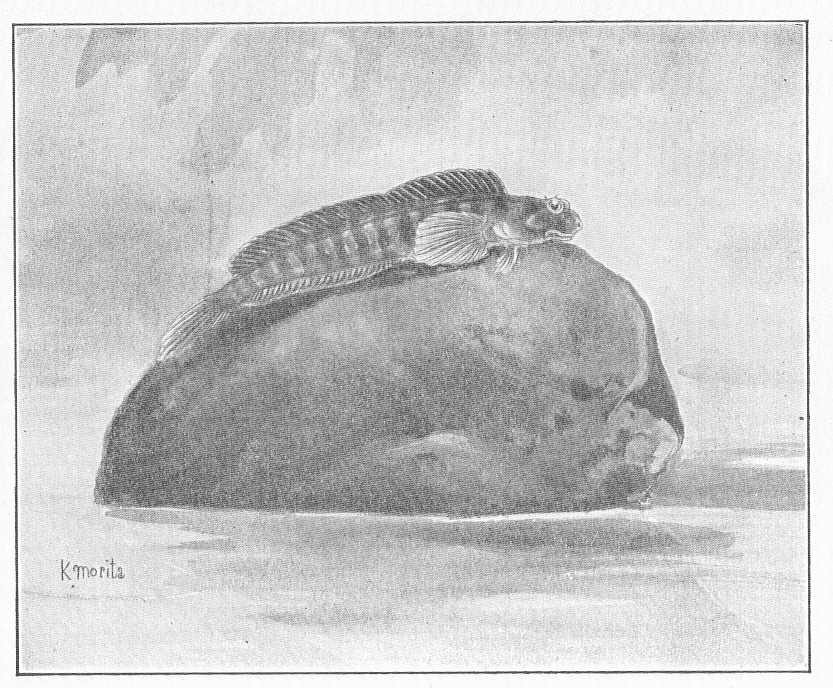

Conservation status
- Least Concern (IUCN 3.1)

Scientific classification
- Kingdom: Animalia
- Phylum: Chordata
- Class: Actinopterygii
- Division: Teleostei
- Order: Blenniiformes
- Family: Blenniidae
- Genus: Alticus
- Species: A. saliens

Binomial name
- Alticus saliens (J. R. Forster, 1788)

Synonyms
- Blennius saliens Forster, 1788; Blennius saliens Lacepède, 1800; Alticus saliens (Lacepède, 1800)

= Leaping blenny =

Species of ray-finned fish

Video of leaping blenny at Tokyo Sealife Park. They crawled up out of the water and up on the rock themselves.

The leaping blenny (Alticus saliens), also known as the jumping blenny, is a species of combtooth blenny (family Blenniidae) in the genus Alticus. There is some uncertainty as to whether it was first described by J.R. Forster in 1788 or B.G.E. Lacepède in 1800, although Fishbase currently accredits it to Forster. It was originally described as a member of the genus Blennius.

It is a tropical blenny known from the Pacific and Indian oceans, including the Red Sea, the Society Islands, the Ryukyu and Bonin Islands, Queensland, Australia; and the Mariana Islands. Leaping blennies have been recorded at a maximum water depth of 2 metres, though notably live above the water. They inhabit holes in limestone deposits in intertidal zones, and leap between holes when disturbed, earning them their common name. They are very social at mid-tide, using visual displays to warn off competitors and attract mates. Although they must remain moist to breathe, the blennies are able to breathe air, and actively avoid submersion by tide waters.

Leaping blennies feed primarily off of algae. They are oviparous and form distinct pairs when mating. They can reach a maximum total length of 10 centimetres (4 inches).
