= Pacific leaping blenny =

- A leaping blenny jumping

Conservation status
- Least Concern (IUCN 3.1)

Scientific classification
- Kingdom: Animalia
- Phylum: Chordata
- Class: Actinopterygii
- Division: Teleostei
- Order: Blenniiformes
- Family: Blenniidae
- Genus: Alticus
- Species: A. arnoldorum

Binomial name
- Alticus arnoldorum (Curtiss, 1938)

Synonyms
- Blennius arnoldorum Curtiss, 1938

Species of fish

The Pacific leaping blenny (Alticus arnoldorum), also known as the leaping rockskipper, is a species of combtooth blenny (family Blenniidae) in the genus Alticus. The blennies are oviparous, and form distinct pairs when mating. Males can reach a maximum total length of 8 centimetres (3.15 inches). These fish feed primarily on benthic algae, which they consume by scraping off rocky surfaces.

== Description ==
Male Pacific leaping blennies have prominent head crests and orange-red dorsal fins.

== Distribution and habitat ==
The Pacific leaping blenny is a tropical blenny found in reefs in Samoa and the Marianas, Society, and Cook Islands, in the western and southern Pacific Ocean. The blennies are noted for leaping from hole to hole in the limestone rocks they inhabit, when disturbed; each of the common names for the species is derived from this. They are able to dwell on land for several hours at a time, and have been reported performing many activities, including foraging and mating while out of the water. However, they are only able to survive on land during midtide; if they remain out of water when the tide lowers enough that they cannot be kept moist, they dry out and suffocate. In a study performed by Tonia Hsieh of Temple University, in Philadelphia, Pennsylvania, it was discovered that members of A. arnoldorum are able to thrive on land due to their ability to twist their tails axially at 90 degrees, to propel their bodies. Hsieh noted that the twisting of the tail was a behaviourism unique to A. arnoldorum and species in the genus Andamia; the two genera were subsequently considered terrestrial.

== Name ==
The identity of the person commemorated in the specific name of this blenny is unclear. The author, Curtiss, is known to have read The Sea-Beach at Ebb-Tide: A Guide to the Study of the Seaweeds and the Lower Animal Life Found Between Tidemarks by Augusta Foote Arnold (1844-1903) and gave several taxa a similar epithet.
