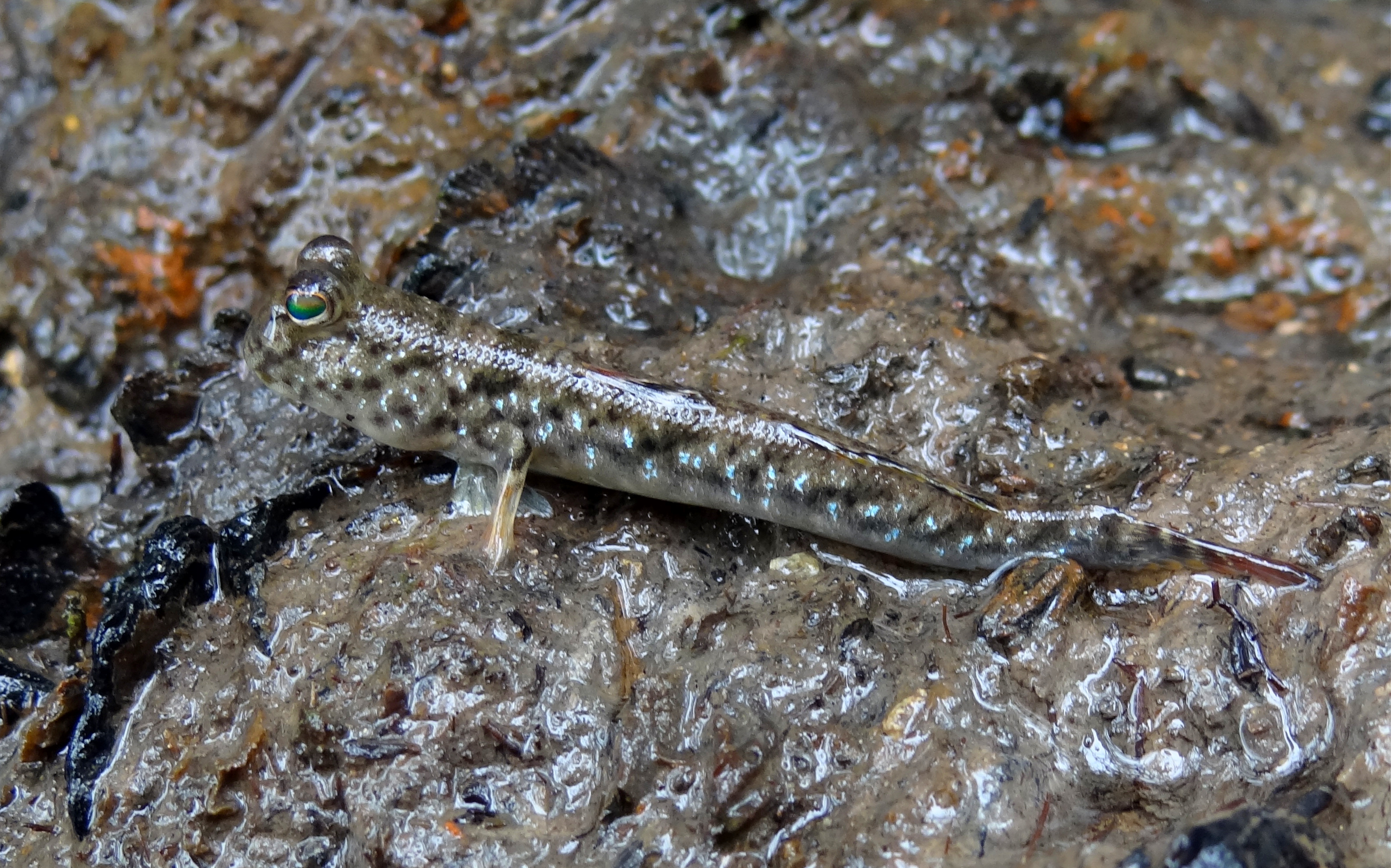

Scientific classification
- Kingdom: Animalia
- Phylum: Chordata
- Class: Actinopterygii
- Division: Teleostei
- Order: Gobiiformes
- Family: Oxudercidae
- Genus: Periophthalmus
- Species: P. gracilis

Binomial name
- Periophthalmus gracilis Eggert, 1935

= Periophthalmus gracilis =

Species of fish

Periophthalmus gracilis, the slender mudskipper, known as belacak in Malay, is a species of mudskippers native to marine and brackish waters of the eastern Indian Ocean and the western Pacific Ocean where it is an inhabitant of the intertidal zone. Capable of spending time out of water, This species can reach a length of 4.5 centimetres (1.8 in) SL.

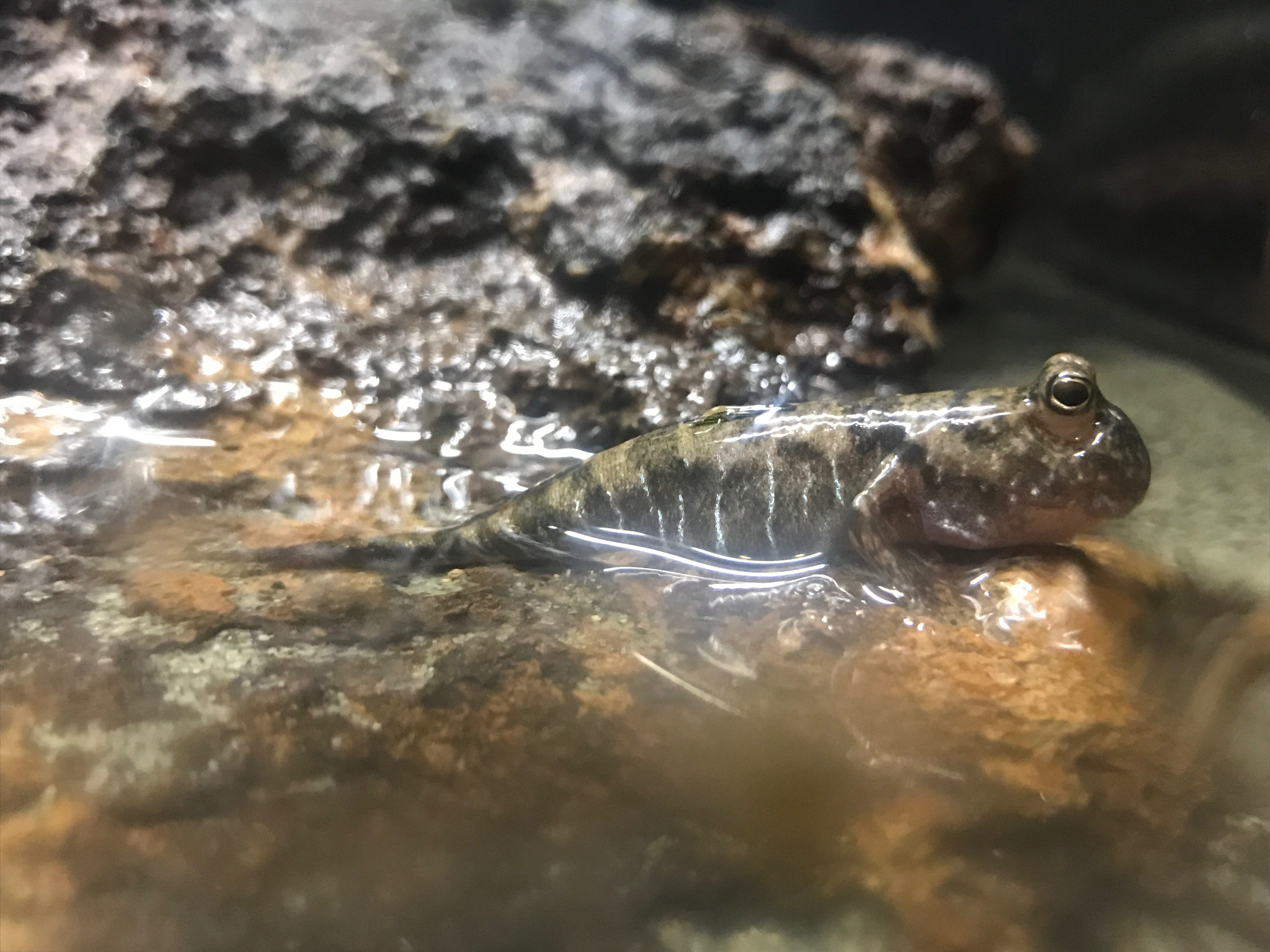
Slender mudskipper at the Vancouver Aquarium

== Relationship with humans ==
=== In folklore ===
In Malaysia and Indonesia, the folklore Batu Belah Batu Bertangkup has Si Tanjung's desire to eat slender mudskipper's eggs as the origins of the conflict of the well-loved folk-story, and tells the story of a widowed-mother and her two children.
