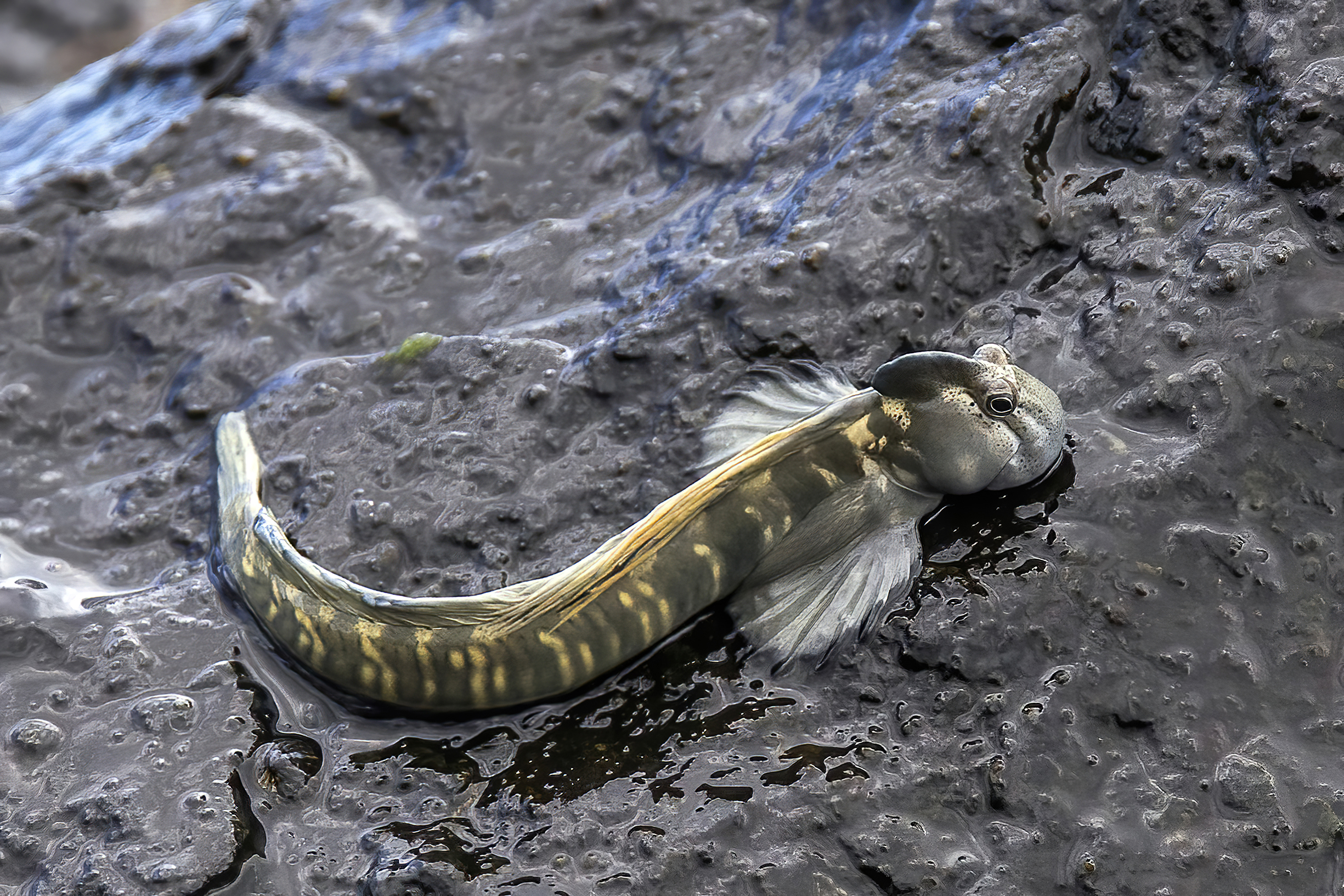
- Alticus anjouanae
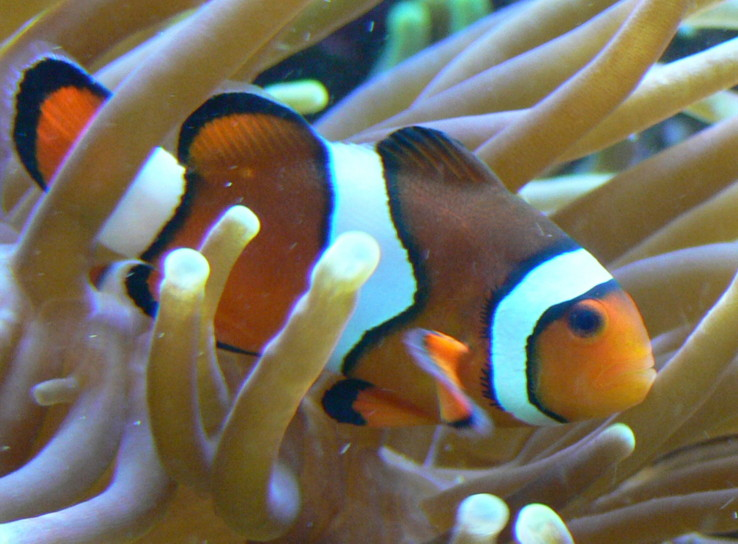
- Orange clownfish (Amphiprion percula)

Scientific classification
- Kingdom: Animalia
- Phylum: Chordata
- Class: Actinopterygii
- Clade: Ovalentaria
- Order: Blenniiformes; Bleeker, 1860

Families
- See text

= Blenniiformes =

Blenniiformes Temporal range: Early Paleocene to present

Order of fishes

Blenniiformes is an order of percomorph fish in the clade Ovalentaria, of which it is the most diverse group. This order contains several well-known fish groups such as blennies and damselfish.

The term is derived from the Latin word blennius, which itself comes from the Ancient Greek word βλεννός (blennos), meaning "mucus" or "slime." This refers to the slimy coating that is often found on the scales of blenny fish.

The earliest known member of this order is the stem group-damselfish Chaychanus from the Early Paleocene of Mexico.

== Taxonomy ==
As with many other percomorphs, most members of this group were originally placed in the Perciformes. Previously, Fishes of the World defined this order as restricted to the blennies and their close relatives, and placed several taxa such as the damselfishes, jawfishes, and surfperches as indeterminate members of Ovalentaria. Phylogenetic evidence suggests that these families form a successive grade leading to blennies, leading to them also being placed in this order by newer authorities such as Eschmeyer's Catalog of Fishes. Some studies go even further and also place the Cichliformes and Mugiliformes (the closest relatives of this group based on phylogenetic studies) within this order, although this is not followed by Catalog of Fishes.

The following families are placed here by Eschmeyer's Catalog of Fishes:

- Order Blenniiformes
  - Family Pseudochromidae Müller & Troschel, 1849 - dottybacks
  - Family Plesiopidae Günther, 1861 - roundheads
  - Family Pomacentridae Bonaparte, 1831 - damselfishes & anemonefishes
  - Family Embiotocidae Agassiz, 1853 - surfperches
  - Family Grammatidae Jordan, 1887 - gramma basslets
  - Family Opistognathidae Bonaparte, 1835 - jawfishes
  - Suborder Gobiesocoidei
    - Family Gobiesocidae Bleeker, 1859 - clingfishes
  - Suborder Blennioidei - blennies
    - Family Tripterygiidae Whitley, 1931 - triplefins or threefin blennies
    - Family Blenniidae Rafinesque, 1810 - combtooth blennies
    - Family Clinidae Swainson, 1839 - kelp blennies
    - Family Labrisomidae Clark Hubbs, 1952 - labrisomid blennies
    - Family Chaenopsidae Gill, 1865 - pikeblennies or tube blennies
    - Family Dactyloscopidae Gill, 1859 - sand stargazers
