= Walking =

Gait of locomotion among legged animals

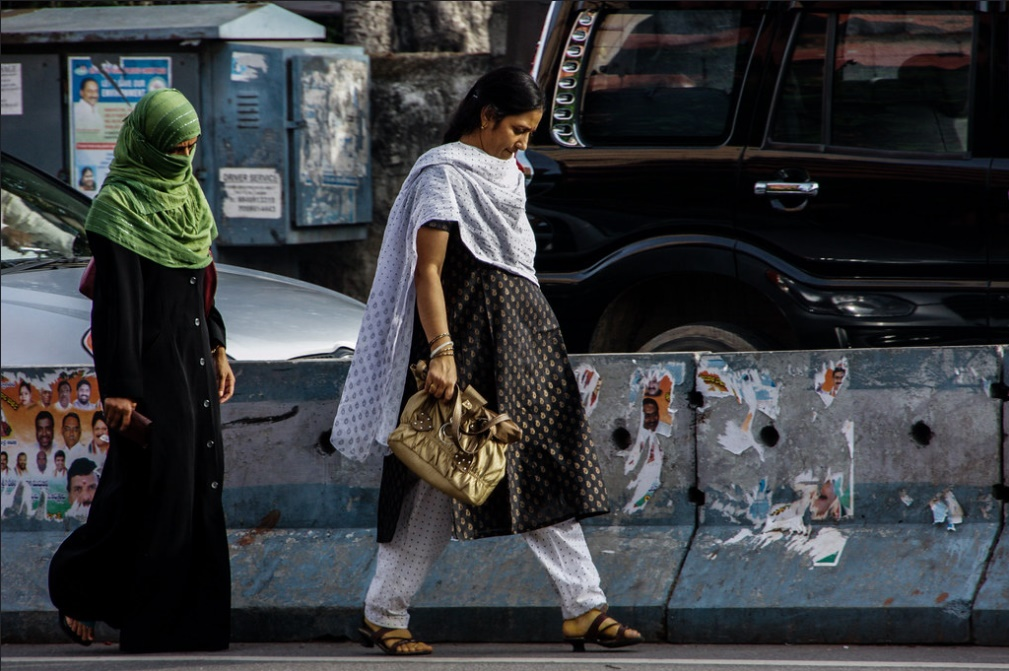
Women walking in Hyderabad

Walking (also known as ambulation) is one of the main gaits of terrestrial locomotion among legged animals. Walking is typically slower than running and other gaits. Walking is defined as an "inverted pendulum" gait in which the body vaults over the stiff limb or limbs with each step. This applies regardless of the usable number of limbs—even arthropods, with six, eight, or more limbs, walk. In humans, limited research indicates that walking may be associated with reduced risk of diseases and premature death.

The word "walking" is also synonymous with hiking in the United Kingdom and the Republic of Ireland (and to a lesser extent in Canada). A short urban walk, in most English-speaking countries is called a "walk".

Walking is a multi-faceted human activity. Humans walk to school and to work, or may have a job that entails walking; it is a form of recreation and a sport; it is a low-impact type of exercise, with possible health benefits; it is walking a dog and beachcombing; it can be part of a spiritual practice.

== Difference from running ==
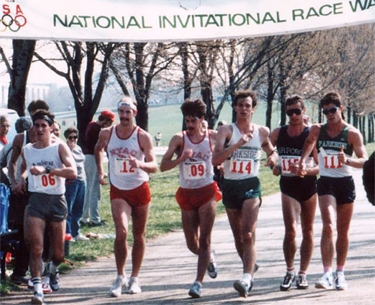
Racewalkers at the World Cup Trials in 1987

The word walk is descended from the Old English wealcan 'to roll'. In humans and other bipeds, walking is generally distinguished from running in that only one foot at a time leaves contact with the ground and there is a period of double-support. In contrast, running begins when both feet leave the ground during each step. This distinction has the status of a formal requirement in competitive walking events. For quadrupedal species, there are numerous gaits which may be termed walking or running, and distinctions based upon the presence or absence of a suspended phase or the number of feet in contact any time do not yield mechanically correct classification. The most effective method to distinguish walking from running is to measure the height of a person's centre of mass using motion capture or a force plate at mid-stance. During walking, the centre of mass reaches a maximum height at mid-stance, while running, it is then at a minimum. This distinction, however, only holds true for locomotion over level or approximately level ground. For walking up grades above 10%, this distinction no longer holds for some individuals. Definitions based on the percentage of the stride during which a foot is in contact with the ground (averaged across all feet) of greater than 50% contact corresponds well with identification of 'inverted pendulum' mechanics and are indicative of walking for animals with any number of limbs; however, this definition is incomplete. Running humans and animals may have contact periods greater than 50% of a gait cycle when rounding corners, running uphill or carrying loads.

Speed is another factor that distinguishes walking from running. Although walking speeds can vary greatly depending on many factors, such as height, weight, age, terrain, surface, load, culture, effort, and fitness, the average human walking speed at crosswalks is about 5.0 kilometres per hour (km/h), or about 1.4 meters per second (m/s), or about 3.1 miles per hour (mph). Specific studies have found pedestrian walking speeds at crosswalks ranging from 4.51 to 4.75 km/h (2.80 to 2.95 mph) for older individuals and from 5.32 to 5.43 km/h (3.31 to 3.37 mph) for younger individuals; a brisk walking speed can be around 6.5 km/h (4.0 mph). In Japan, the standard measure for walking speed is 80 m/min (4.8 km/h). Champion racewalkers can average more than 14 km/h (8.7 mph) over a distance of 20 km (12 mi).

An average human child achieves independent walking ability at around 11 months old.

== Origins ==
A walking hamster

It is theorized that "walking" among tetrapods originated underwater with air-breathing fish that could "walk" underwater, giving rise (potentially with vertebrates like Tiktaalik) to the plethora of land-dwelling life that walk on four or two limbs. While terrestrial tetrapods are theorised to have a single origin, arthropods and their relatives are thought to have independently evolved walking several times, specifically in hexapods, myriapods, chelicerates, tardigrades, onychophorans, and crustaceans. Little skates, members of the demersal fish community, can propel themselves by pushing off the ocean floor with their pelvic fins, using neural mechanisms which evolved as early as 420 million years ago, before vertebrates set foot on land.

=== Hominin ===
A hominin is defined as "a primate of a taxonomic tribe (Hominini), which comprises those species regarded as human, directly ancestral to humans, or very closely related to humans" (OED).

Data in the fossil record indicate that among hominin ancestors, bipedal walking was one of the first defining characteristics to emerge, predating other defining characteristics of Hominidae. Judging from footprints discovered on a former shore in Kenya, it is thought possible that ancestors of modern humans were walking in ways similar to the present activity as long as 3 million years ago.

The walking gait of humans is unique and differs significantly from bipedal or quadrupedal walking gaits of other primates, like chimpanzees. It is believed to have been selectively advantageous in hominin ancestors in the Miocene due to metabolic energy efficiency. Human walking has been found to be slightly more energy efficient than travel for a quadrupedal mammal of a similar size, like chimpanzees. The energy efficiency of human locomotion can be accounted for by the reduced use of muscle in walking, due to an upright posture which places ground reaction forces at the hip and knee. When walking bipedally, chimpanzees take a crouched stance with bent knees and hips, forcing the quadriceps muscles to perform extra work, which costs more energy. Comparing chimpanzee quadrupedal travel to that of true quadrupedal animals has indicated that chimpanzees expend one-hundred and fifty percent of the energy required for travel compared to true quadrupeds.

A 2007 study further explored the origin of human bipedalism, using chimpanzee and human energetic costs of locomotion. They found that the energy spent in moving the human body is less than what would be expected for an animal of similar size and approximately 75% less costly than that of chimpanzees. Chimpanzee quadrupedal and bipedal energy costs are found to be relatively equal, with chimpanzee bipedalism costing roughly ten percent more than quadrupedal. The same 2007 study found that among chimpanzee individuals, the energy costs for bipedal and quadrupedal walking varied significantly, and those that flexed their knees and hips to a greater degree and took a more upright posture, closer to that of humans, were able to save more energy than chimpanzees that did not take this stance. Further, compared to other apes, humans have longer legs and short dorsally oriented ischia (hipbone), which result in longer hamstring extensor moments, improving walking energy economy. Longer legs also support lengthened Achilles tendons which are thought to increase energy efficiency in bipedal locomotor activities. It was thought that hominins like Ardipithecus ramidus, which had a variety of both terrestrial and arboreal adaptions would not be as efficient walkers, however, with a small body mass A. ramidus had developed an energy efficient means of bipedal walking while still maintaining arboreal adaptations. Humans have long femoral necks, meaning that while walking, hip muscles do not require as much energy to flex while moving. These slight kinematic and anatomic differences demonstrate how bipedal walking may have developed as the dominant means of locomotion among early hominins because of the energy saved.

== Mechanism and models ==
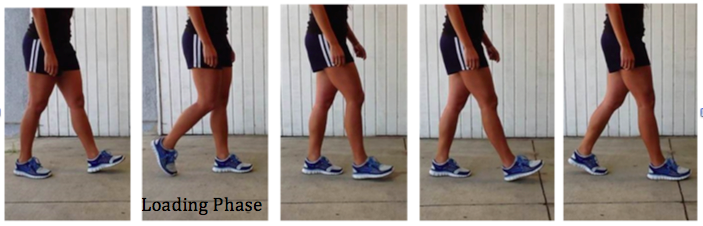
Walking gait cycle starting with the left leg demonstrated. The loading cycle is where foot pronation naturally occurs.

Human walking is accomplished with a strategy called the double pendulum. During forward motion, the leg that leaves the ground swings forward from the hip. This sweep is the first pendulum. Then the leg strikes the ground with the heel and rolls through to the toe in a motion described as an inverted pendulum. The motion of the two legs is coordinated so that one foot or the other is always in contact with the ground. While walking, the muscles of the calf contract, raising the body's center of mass, and during muscle contraction, potential energy is stored. Then gravity pulls the body forward and down onto the other leg and the potential energy is then transformed into kinetic energy. The process of human walking can save approximately 65 percent of the energy used by using gravity in forward motion. After the completion of each step, when the lead foot has been securely placed and any impact safely absorbed, the walker performs a rapid process of immediate active recovery enabling them to regain energy after their exertion. They then begin their next step. The recovery phase is part of their overall walking gait cycle and enables them to continue walking through the increased provision of energy and the related avoidance of fatigue.

Walking differs from a running gait in a number of ways. The most obvious is that during walking one leg always stays on the ground while the other is swinging. In running there is typically a ballistic phase where the runner is airborne with both feet in the air (for bipedals).

Human walking cycle animation by Eadweard Muybridge

Another difference concerns the movement of the centre of mass of the body. In walking the body "vaults" over the leg on the ground, raising the centre of mass to its highest point as the leg passes the vertical, and dropping it to the lowest as the legs are spread apart. Essentially kinetic energy of forward motion is constantly being traded for a rise in potential energy. This is reversed in running where the centre of mass is at its lowest as the leg is vertical. This is because the impact of landing from the ballistic phase is absorbed by bending the leg and consequently storing energy in muscles and tendons. In running there is a conversion between kinetic, potential, and elastic energy.

There is an absolute limit on an individual's speed of walking (without special techniques such as those employed in speed walking) due to the upwards acceleration of the centre of mass during a stride – if it is greater than the acceleration due to gravity the person will become airborne as they vault over the leg on the ground. Typically, however, animals switch to a run at a lower speed than this due to energy efficiencies.

Based on the 2D inverted pendulum model of walking, there are at least five physical constraints that place fundamental limits on walking like an inverted pendulum. These constraints are: take-off constraint, sliding constraint, fall-back constraint, steady-state constraint, and high step-frequency constraint.

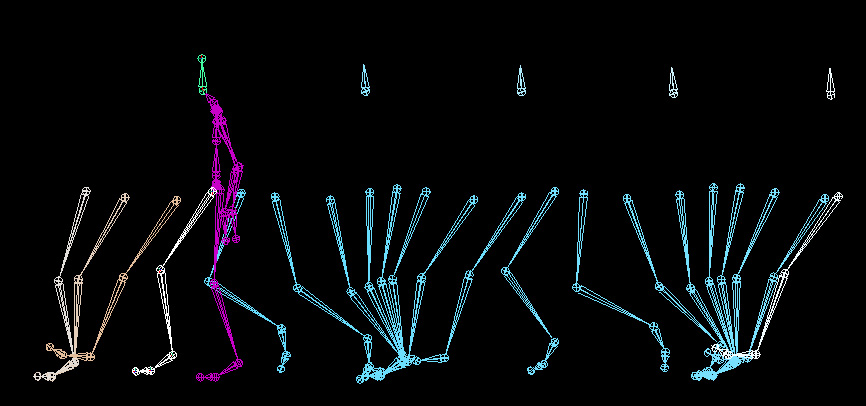
Computer simulation of a human walk cycle. In this model the head keeps the same level at all times, whereas the hip follows a sine curve.

Multiple mathematical models have been proposed to reproduce the kinematics observed in walking. These may be broadly broken down into four categories: rule-based models based on mechanical considerations and past literature, weakly coupled phase oscillators models, control-based models which guide simulations to maximize some property of locomotion, and phenomenological models which fit equations directly to the kinematics.

=== Rule-based models ===
The rule-based models integrate the past literature on motor control to generate a few simple rules which are presumed to be responsible for walking (e.g. "loading of the left leg triggers unloading of right leg"). Such models are generally most strictly based on the past literature and when they are based on a few rules can be easy to interpret. However, the influence of each rule can be hard to interpret when these models become more complex. Furthermore, the tuning of parameters is often done in an ad hoc way, revealing little intuition about why the system may be organized in this way. Finally, such models are typically based fully on sensory feedback, ignoring the effect of descending and rhythm generating neurons, which have been shown to be crucial in coordinating proper walking.

=== Coupled oscillator models ===
Dynamical system theory shows that any network with cyclical dynamics may be modeled as a set of weakly coupled phase oscillators, so another line of research has been exploring this view of walking. Each oscillator may model a muscle, joint angle, or even a whole leg, and is coupled to some set of other oscillators. Often, these oscillators are thought to represent the central pattern generators underlying walking. These models have rich theory behind them, allow for some extensions based on sensory feedback, and can be fit to kinematics. However, they need to be heavily constrained to fit to data and by themselves make no claims on which gaits allow the animal to move faster, more robustly, or more efficiently.

=== Control based models ===
Control-based models start with a simulation based on some description of the animal's anatomy and optimize control parameters to generate some behavior. These may be based on a musculoskeletal model, skeletal model, or even simply a ball and stick model. As these models generate locomotion by optimizing some metric, they can be used to explore the space of optimal locomotion behaviors under some assumptions. However, they typically do not generate plausible hypotheses on the neural coding underlying the behaviors and are typically sensitive to modeling assumptions.

=== Statistical models ===
Phenomenological models model the kinematics of walking directly by fitting a dynamical system, without postulating an underlying mechanism for how the kinematics are generated neurally. Such models can produce the most realistic kinematic trajectories and thus have been explored for simulating walking for computer-based animation. However, the lack of underlying mechanism makes it hard to apply these models to study the biomechanical or neural properties of walking.

== Recreation ==
The idea of taking a walk in the countryside only really developed during the 18th century in Europe, and arose because of changing attitudes to the landscape and nature associated with the Romantic movement. In 1790, William Wordsworth set off on an extended tour of France, Switzerland, and Germany, which he describes in his autobiographical poem The Prelude (1850). In earlier times walking generally indicated poverty and was also associated with vagrancy. In previous centuries long walks were undertaken as part of religious pilgrimages and this tradition continues throughout the world.

Many people walk as a favored recreation and simple form of exercise. For some, walking is a way to enjoy nature and the outdoors.

Some people prefer to walk indoors on a treadmill, or in a gym, and fitness walkers and others may use a pedometer to count their steps. Hiking is the usual word used in Canada, the United States and South Africa for long vigorous walks; similar walks are called tramps in New Zealand, or hill walking or just walking in Australia, the UK and the Irish Republic. In the UK, rambling is also used. Australians also bushwalk. In English-speaking parts of North America, the term walking is used for short walks, especially in towns and cities. Snow shoeing is walking in snow; a slightly different gait is required compared with regular walking.

There are various organizations that have been established to encourage walking, including the European Ramblers' Association, the Appalachian Mountain Club in the USA, and in Britain The Ramblers.

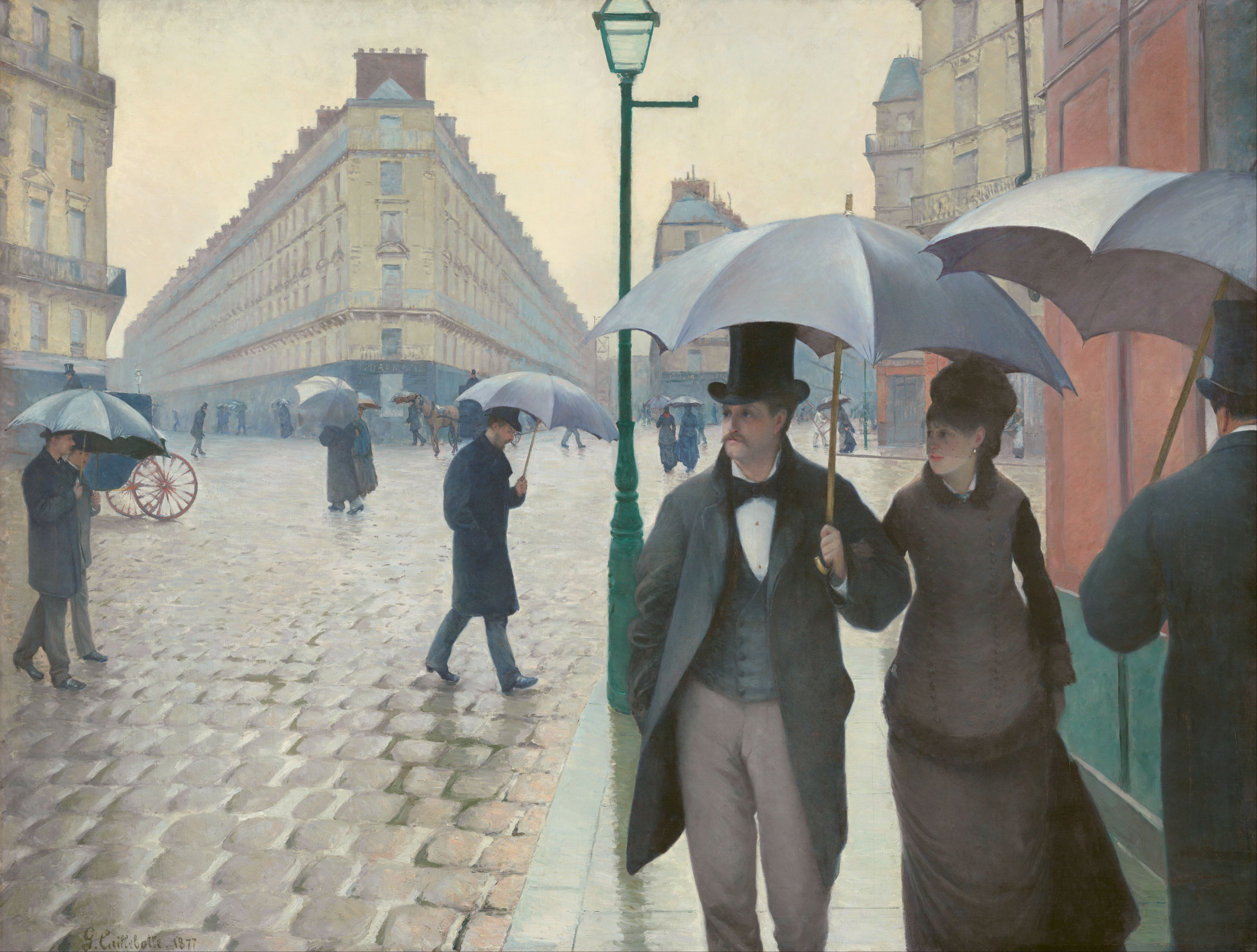
Paris street: Rainy day, Gustave Caillebotte, 1877.

With the development of large cities with a bourgeois class, such as Paris, the figure of the flâneur (feminine, passante or flâneuse) appeared: a person with leisure time that strolls the city streets observing city life and architecture.

=== Tourism ===
In terms of tourism, the possibilities range from guided walking tours in cities, to organized trekking holidays in the Himalayas. In the UK the term walking tour also refers to a multi-day walk or hike undertaken by a group or individual. Well-organized systems of trails exist in many other European countries, as well as Canada, United States, New Zealand, and Nepal. Systems of lengthy waymarked walking trails now stretch across Europe from Norway to Turkey, Portugal to Cyprus. Many also walk the traditional pilgrim routes, of which the most famous is the Camino de Santiago, The Way of St. James.

Numerous walking festivals and other walking events take place each year in many countries. The world's largest multi-day walking event is the International Four Days Marches Nijmegen in the Netherlands. The "Vierdaagse" (Dutch for "Four day Event") is an annual walk that has taken place since 1909; it has been based at Nijmegen since 1916. Depending on age group and category, walkers have to walk 30, 40 or 50 kilometers each day for four days. Originally a military event with a few civilians, it now is a mainly civilian event. Numbers have risen in recent years, with over 40,000 now taking part, including about 5,000 military personnel. Due to crowds on the route, since 2004 the organizers have limited the number of participants. In the U.S., there is the annual Labor Day walk on Mackinac Bridge, Michigan, which draws over 60,000 participants; it is the largest single-day walking event; while the Chesapeake Bay Bridge Walk in Maryland draws over 50,000 participants each year. There are also various walks organised as charity events, with walkers sponsored for a specific cause. These walks range in length from 2 miles (3.2 km) or 5 km (3.1 mi) to 50 mi (80 km). The MS Challenge Walk is an 80 km (50 mi) walk which raises money for multiple sclerosis research, while walkers in the Oxfam Trailwalker cover 100 km (62 mi).

=== Walking art ===
Walking art is a variety of artistic practices that position walking as the central process, experience or outcome. Walking artists have diverse interests and it 'has gathered practitioners from nearly every field'.^{:43} Despite emerging from a variety of artistic and literary traditions, a 'common feature [of walking art] is the engagement of the body in a process of walking through a landscape based on a specific artistic design.'^{:161} Some artists consider walking an artistic end in itself, while others use walking as a means of mark-making, storytelling, social practice, or to create work in other artistic media.

In her influential book Wanderlust, Rebecca Solnit traces the origins of walking as an artistic practice to the 1960s, when 'a new realm of walking opened up [ . . . ] walking as art.'^{:267} Other scholars, such as Francesco Careri and Blake Morris, highlight the importance of the Dada excursion of 1921, when the French contingent of the Dada movement led a walk at the Church of Saint-Julien-le-Pauvre in Paris.^{:34} Scholars also note the strong connection between writing, walking, and philosophy, from the peripatetic school of the Ancient Greeks to the walks of Romantic poets and artists, to the phenomenological works of Husserl and Merleau-Ponty.

=== Spirituality ===
Preliminary studies indicate that walking in nature may elicit feelings of self-transcendence in which some individuals became less self-focused.

American transcendentalist Thoreau in his essay "Walking" and his other writings saw the relationship between people and the natural world as the answer to mankind's search for higher power. In the “Friday” chapter of A Week on the Concord and Merrimack Rivers, he argues that, “Is not Nature, rightly read, that of which she is commonly taken to be the symbol merely?” Noting too in other journal entries that he was always intent “to be always on the alert to find God in nature” Another serious walker and lover of nature, Scottish born American John Muir was influenced by Thoreau's philosophy. During his career as writer and while living in the mountains, Muir experience the "presence of the divine in nature". His personal letters also conveyed these feelings of ecstasy. Historian Catherine Albanese stated that in one of his letters, "Muir's eucharist made Thoreau's feast on wood-chuck and huckleberry seem almost anemic". Muir was extremely fond of Thoreau and was probably influenced more by him than even Emerson. Muir often referred to himself as a "disciple" of Thoreau.

== Variants ==
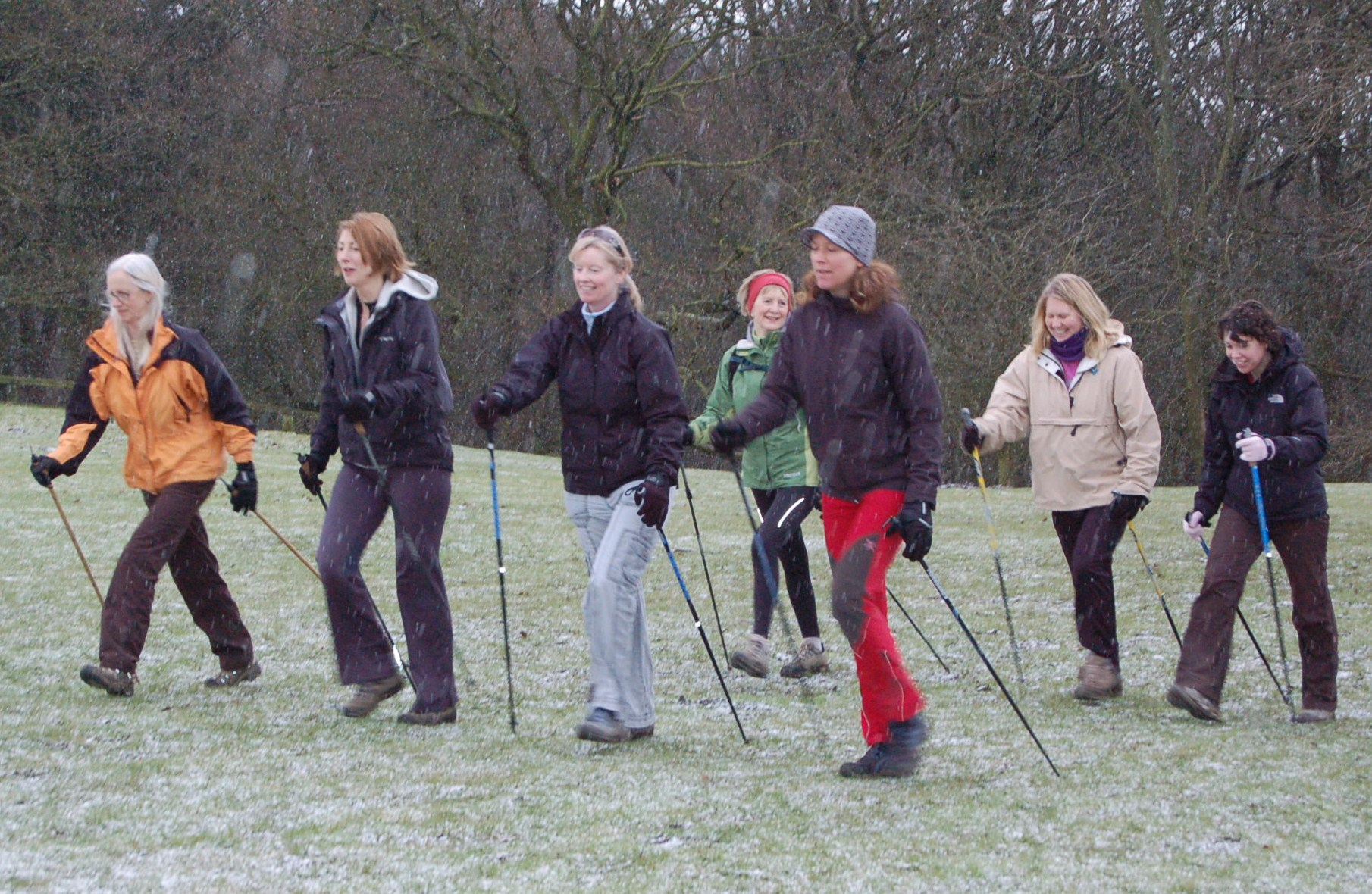
Nordic walkers

- Scrambling is a method of ascending a hill or mountain that involves using both hands, because of the steepness of the terrain. Of necessity, it will be a slow and careful form of walking and with the possibility of occasional brief, easy rock climbing. Some scrambling takes place on narrow exposed ridges where more attention to balance will be required than in normal walking.
- Snow shoeing – Snowshoes are footwear for walking over the snow. Snowshoes work by distributing the weight of the person over a larger area so that the person's foot does not sink completely into the snow, a quality called "flotation". It is often said by snowshoers that if you can walk, you can snowshoe. This is true in optimal conditions, but snowshoeing properly requires some slight adjustments to walking. The method of walking is to lift the shoes slightly and slide the inner edges over each other, thus avoiding the unnatural and fatiguing "straddle-gait" that would otherwise be necessary. A snowshoer must be willing to roll their feet slightly as well. An exaggerated stride works best when starting out, particularly with larger or traditional shoes.
- Cross-country skiing – originally conceived like snow shoes as a means of travel in deep snow. Trails hiked in the summer are often skied in the winter and the Norwegian Trekking Association maintains over 400 huts stretching across thousands of kilometres of trails which hikers can use in the summer and skiers in the winter.
- Beach walking is a sport that is based on a walk on the sand of the beach. Beach walking can be developed on compact sand or non-compact sand. There are beach walking competitions on non-compact sand, and there are world records of beach walking on non-compact sand in Multiday distances. Beach walking has a specific technique of walk.

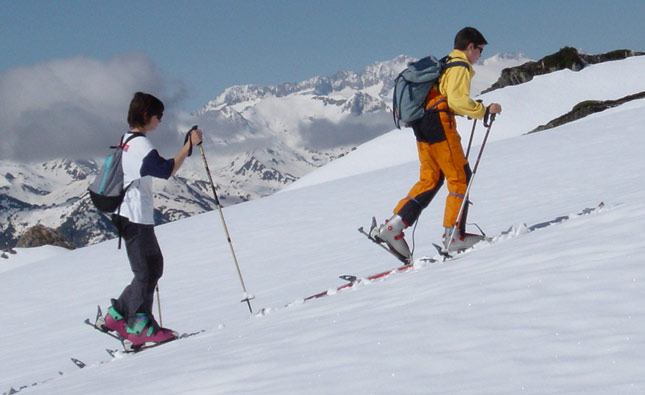
Free heels are a defining characteristic of ski touring

- Nordic walking is a physical activity and a sport, which is performed with specially designed walking poles similar to ski poles. Compared to regular walking, Nordic walking (also called pole walking) involves applying force to the poles with each stride. Nordic walkers use more of their entire body (with greater intensity), and receive fitness-building stimulation not present in normal walking for the upper body muscles . Nordic walking has higher oxygen consumption and energy expenditure compared to walking without poles.
- Pedestrianism is a sport that developed during the late eighteenth and nineteenth centuries, and was a popular spectator sport in the British Isles. By the end of the 18th century, and especially with the growth of the popular press, feats of foot travel over great distances (similar to a modern ultramarathon) gained attention, and were labeled "pedestrianism". Pedestrianism was first codified in the last half of the 19th century, evolving into what would become racewalking, By the mid 19th century, competitors were often expected to extend their legs straight at least once in their stride, and obey what was called the "fair heel and toe" rule.
- Speed walking is the general term for fast walking. Within the speed walking category are a variety of fast walking techniques, such as power walking.
- Power walking is the act of walking with a speed at the upper end of the natural range for walking gait, typically 7 to 9 km/h (4.3 to 5.6 mph). To qualify as power walking as opposed to jogging or running, at least one foot must be in contact with the ground at all times.
- Psychogeography – Guy Debord defined psychogeography as "the study of the precise laws and specific effects of the geographical environment, consciously organized or not, on the emotions and behavior of individuals." A form of urban walking practice known as the dérive: an unplanned journey through a landscape, usually urban. As a practice and theory, psychogeography has influenced a broad set of cultural actors, including artists, activists and academics.
- Racewalking is a long-distance athletic event. Although it is a foot race, it is different from running in that one foot must appear to be in contact with the ground at all times. Stride length is reduced, so to achieve competitive speeds, racewalkers must attain cadence rates comparable to those achieved by Olympic 800-meter runners, and they must do so for hours at a time since the Olympic events are the 20 km (12 mi) race walk (men and women) and 50 km (31 mi) race walk (men only), and 50-mile (80 km) events are also held. See also pedestrianism above.
- Afghan walking: The Afghan walk is a rhythmic breathing technique synchronized with walking. It was born in the 1980s on the basis of the observations made by the Frenchman Édouard G. Stiegler, during his contacts with Afghan caravaners, capable of making walks of more than 60 km (37 mi) per day for dozens of days.
- Backward walking: In this activity, an individual walks in reverse, facing away from their intended direction of movement. This unique form of exercise has gained popularity for its various health and fitness benefits. It requires more attention and engages different muscles than forward walking, making it a valuable addition to a fitness routine. Some potential benefits of retro walking include improved balance, enhanced coordination, strengthened leg muscles, and reduced knee stress. It is also a rehabilitation exercise for certain injuries and can be a way to switch up one's workout routine.
- Walking meditation is a meditation practice done while walking common in Buddhism.
- Field walking, Archeology
- Bushwalking, volksmarching, and trekking.
- Scavenger hunt, including "Walk-a-hunt".

== Walkability ==
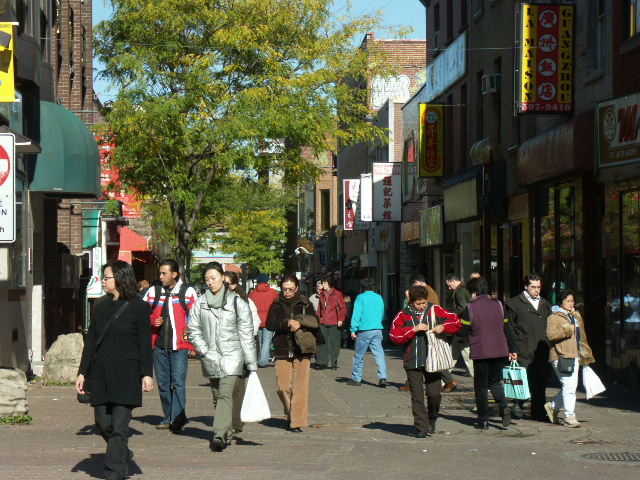
Gauchetière Street, Montreal, Quebec, Canada

There has been a recent focus among urban planners in some communities to create pedestrian-friendly areas and roads, allowing commuting, shopping and recreation to be done on foot. The concept of walkability has arisen as a measure of the degree to which an area is friendly to walking. Some communities are at least partially car-free, making them particularly supportive of walking and other modes of transportation. In the United States, the active living network is an example of a concerted effort to develop communities more friendly to walking and other physical activities.

An example of such efforts to make urban development more pedestrian friendly is the pedestrian village. This is a compact, pedestrian-oriented neighborhood or town, with a mixed-use village center. Shared-use lanes for pedestrians and those using bicycles, Segways, wheelchairs, and other small rolling conveyances that do not use internal combustion engines. Generally, these lanes are in front of the houses and businesses, and streets for motor vehicles are always at the rear. Some pedestrian villages might be nearly car-free with cars either hidden below the buildings or on the periphery of the village. Venice, Italy is essentially a pedestrian village with canals. The canal district in Venice, California, on the other hand, combines the front lane/rear street approach with canals and walkways, or just walkways.

Walking is also considered to be a clear example of a sustainable mode of transport, especially suited for urban use and/or relatively shorter distances. Non-motorized transport modes such as walking, but also cycling, small-wheeled transport (skates, skateboards, push scooters and hand carts) or wheelchair travel are often key elements of successfully encouraging clean urban transport. A large variety of case studies and good practices (from European cities and some worldwide examples) that promote and stimulate walking as a means of transportation in cities can be found at Eltis, Europe's portal for local transport.

The development of specific rights of way with appropriate infrastructure can promote increased participation and enjoyment of walking. Examples of types of investment include pedestrian malls, and foreshoreways such as oceanways and also river walks.

The first purpose-built pedestrian street in Europe is the Lijnbaan in Rotterdam, opened in 1953. The first pedestrianised shopping centre in the UK was in Stevenage in 1959. A large number of European towns and cities have made part of their centres car-free since the early 1960s. These are often accompanied by car parks on the edge of the pedestrianised zone, and, in the larger cases, park and ride schemes. Central Copenhagen is one of the largest and oldest: It was converted from car traffic into pedestrian zone in 1962.

== Potential health effects ==
Regular, brisk exercise may improve confidence, stamina, energy, weight control, and reduce stress. Walking may enhance memory skills, learning ability, concentration, mood, and overall health.

A 2023 study found that walking at least 2,337 steps per day was associated with reduced risk of dying from cardiovascular diseases, and 3,867 steps a day reduced the risk of dying from any cause.

Reviews have indicated that 2.5 hours of brisk walking per week may reduce the risk of depression by about 25%, and that taking 5,000 or more steps per day was associated with fewer symptoms of depression. A 2026 review reported that Nordic walking for four weeks or more in adults with type 2 diabetes had greater reductions in body weight and improved cholesterol levels compared to prediabetic people. A 2015 review indicated that participation in walking groups may confer health effects, such as small decreases in blood pressure, body fat, and blood cholesterol.

Preliminary studies show that walking may stimulate divergent thinking and creative ideas.

== In robotics ==
Generally, the first successful walking robots had six legs. As microprocessor technology advanced, the number of legs could be reduced and there are now robots that can walk on two legs. One, for example, is ASIMO. Although there has been significant advances, robots still do not walk nearly as well as human beings as they often need to keep their knees bent permanently in order to improve stability.

In 2009, Japanese roboticist Tomotaka Takahashi developed a robot that can jump three inches off the ground. The robot, named Ropid, is capable of getting up, walking, running, and jumping.

Many other robots have also been able to walk over the years like a bipedal walking robot.

== Animals ==
=== Horses ===
The walk, a four-beat gait

The walk is a four-beat gait that averages about 4 miles per hour (6.4 km/h). When walking, a horse's legs follow this sequence: left hind leg, left front leg, right hind leg, right front leg, in a regular 1-2-3-4 beat. At the walk, the horse will always have one foot raised and the other three feet on the ground, save for a brief moment when weight is being transferred from one foot to another. A horse moves its head and neck in a slight up and down motion that helps maintain balance.

Ideally, the advancing rear hoof oversteps the spot where the previously advancing front hoof touched the ground. The more the rear hoof oversteps, the smoother and more comfortable the walk becomes. Individual horses and different breeds vary in the smoothness of their walk. However, a rider will almost always feel some degree of gentle side-to-side motion in the horse's hips as each hind leg reaches forward.

The fastest "walks" with a four-beat footfall pattern are actually the lateral forms of ambling gaits such as the running walk, singlefoot, and similar rapid but smooth intermediate speed gaits. If a horse begins to speed up and lose a regular four-beat cadence to its gait, the horse is no longer walking but is beginning to either trot or pace.

=== Elephants ===
An Asian elephant walking

Elephants can move both forwards and backwards, but cannot trot, jump, or gallop. They use only two gaits when moving on land, the walk and a faster gait similar to running. In walking, the legs act as pendulums, with the hips and shoulders rising and falling while the foot is planted on the ground. With no "aerial phase", the fast gait does not meet all the criteria of running, although the elephant uses its legs much like other running animals, with the hips and shoulders falling and then rising while the feet are on the ground. Fast-moving elephants appear to 'run' with their front legs, but 'walk' with their hind legs and can reach a top speed of 18 km/h (11 mph). At this speed, most other quadrupeds are well into a gallop, even accounting for leg length.

=== Walking fish ===
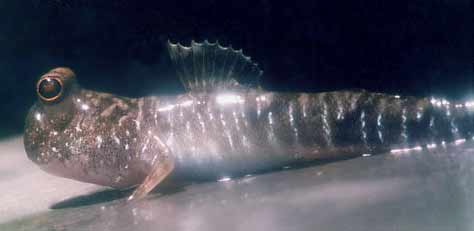
A mudskipper, a type of walking fish, perched on land

Walking fish (or ambulatory fish) are fish that are able to travel over land for extended periods of time. The term may also be used for some other cases of nonstandard fish locomotion, e.g., when describing fish "walking" along the sea floor, as the handfish or frogfish.

=== Insects ===
Insects must carefully coordinate their six legs during walking to produce gaits that allow for efficient navigation of their environment. Interleg coordination patterns have been studied in a variety of insects, including locusts (Schistocerca gregaria), cockroaches (Periplaneta americana), stick insects (Carausius morosus), and fruit flies (Drosophila melanogaster). Different walking gaits have been observed to exist on a speed dependent continuum of phase relationships. Even though their walking gaits are not discrete, they can often be broadly categorized as either a metachronal wave gait, tetrapod gait, or tripod gait.

In a metachronal wave gait, only one leg leaves contact with the ground at a time. This gait starts at one of the hind legs, then propagates forward to the mid and front legs on the same side before starting at the hind leg of the contralateral side. The wave gait is often used at slow walking speeds and is the most stable, since five legs are always in contact with the ground at a time.

In a tetrapod gait, two legs swing at a time while the other four legs remain in contact with the ground. There are multiple configurations for tetrapod gaits, but the legs that swing together must be on contralateral sides of the body. Tetrapod gaits are typically used at medium speeds and are stable.

A walking gait is considered tripod if three of the legs enter the swing phase simultaneously, while the other three legs make contact with the ground. The middle leg of one side swings with the hind and front legs on the contralateral side. Tripod gaits are most commonly used at high speeds, though it can be used at lower speeds. The gait is less stable than wave-like and tetrapod gaits, but it is theorized to be the most robust. This means that it is easier for an insect to recover from an offset in step timing when walking in a tripod gait. The ability to respond robustly is important for insects when traversing uneven terrain.

== See also ==
- Active mobility
- Arm swing in human locomotion
- Footpath
- Gait training
- Kinhin
- New Urbanism
- Obesity and walking
- Pedestrian*
- Pedestrian village
- Pedestrian zone
- Peripatetic school, a school of philosophy allegedly named after Socrates' habit of walking while teaching
- Preferred walking speed
- Walkability
- Walkathon
- Walking city
- Walking tour
