= Australian spotted handfish =

Conservation status
- Least Concern (IUCN 3.1)

Scientific classification
- Kingdom: Animalia
- Phylum: Chordata
- Class: Actinopterygii
- Order: Lophiiformes
- Family: Antennariidae
- Genus: Brachionichthys
- Species: B. australis

Binomial name
- Brachionichthys australis Last, Gledhill & Holmes, 2007

Species of fish

The Australian spotted handfish (Brachionichthys australis), also known as the Australian handfish or common handfish, is a species of marine ray-finned fish belonging to the family Brachionichthyidae, the handfishes. This species is endemic to eastern and southern Australia.

== Taxonomy ==
The Australian spotted handfish was first formally described in 2007 by the Australian biologists Peter R. Last, Daniel C. Gledhill and Bronwyn H. Holmes with its type locality given as east of Disaster Bay in New South Wales. Prior to 2007, this species not identified as a separate species from the spotted handfish (B. hirsutus) which has a much more restricted range in Tasmania and which is classified by the International Union for Conservation of Nature as Critically Endangered. The 5th edition of Fishes of the World classifies the genus Brachionichthys, this species being one of two species within that genus, in the family Brachionichthyidae, the handfishes.

== Etymology ==
The Australian spotted handfish has the genus name Brachionichthys, which is a combination of brachium, meaning "arm", an allusion not explained by the author of the genus, Pieter Bleeker, but it probably refers to the arm-like pectoral fin, with ichthys, meaning "fish". The specific name, australis, means "southern", and is a reference to its widespread range in the southern, temperate waters of Australia.

== Description ==
The Australian spotted handfish has a tapering body with a thin rear and a large head which is deeper than the flared tail's height. It has small eyes and a small mouth which has a band of very small teeth in both jaws. The opening of the gills is a tube like pore immediately to the rear of the base of the pectoral fin. It does not have scales but there are small spines in the skin all over the body and fleshy threads on the rear part of the body.

The dorsal fin is made up of three separate parts. The illicium is the on the snout and has the esca on its tip, the spiny dorsal fin is on the head and the soft rayed dorsal fin is behind that. The dorsal fins contain a total of 3 spines, including the illicium, and 18 or 19 soft rays. The anal fin has 9 or 10 soft rays. The pectoral fins are arm like with tips pointing to the front and down.

The head and body are marked with elongated yellowish spots and streaks. There are large dark spots on the tail while the other fins have black or orange spots. this species has a maximum published standard length of 6.5 cm (2.6 in).

== Distribution and habitat ==
The Australian spotted handfish is found from Brisbane south to Tasmania, east as far as Middini Beach on the Great Australian Bight in Western Australia. In Tasmania it is found along the north and east coasts as far south as the D'Entrecasteaux Channel. This is a demersal fish found at depths between 19 and 277 m (62 and 909 ft), although typically between 40 and 150 m (130 and 490 ft), on soft substrates.

== Biology ==
The Australian spotted handfish, like other handfish species, does not have a larval stage. Females lay batches of large eggs which have a filamentous attachment to the substrate. The eggs are guarded by the parent until they hatch into small fishes which have a limited ability to disperse.
