= Moulton's handfish =

Conservation status
- Endangered (IUCN 3.1)

Scientific classification
- Kingdom: Animalia
- Phylum: Chordata
- Class: Actinopterygii
- Order: Lophiiformes
- Family: Antennariidae
- Genus: Sympterichthys
- Species: S. moultoni

Binomial name
- Sympterichthys moultoni Last & Gledhill, 2009

Fish species

Moulton's handfish (Sympterichthys moultoni) is species of marine ray-finned fish belonging to the family Brachionichthyidae, the handfishes. This species is endangered and is endemic to the waters off southeastern Australia.

== Taxonomy ==
Moulton's handfish was first formally described in 2009 by the Australian zoologists Peter R. Last and Daniel C. Gledhill with its type localitygiven as off Cape Howe, New South Wales in southeastern Australia. The genus Sympterichthys is classified within the family Brachionichthyidae which the 5th edition of Fishes of the World classifies the family Brachionichthyidae within the suborder Antennarioidei within the order Lophiiformes, the anglerfishes.

== Etymology ==
Sympterichthys is a combination of symphysis, meaning "grown together", with ichthys, meaning "fish". This is a reference to the first dorsal fin spine being connected to the second by a membrane and to the third spine being connected to the second, soft-rayed dorsal fin, by an incised membrane. The specific name honours the fisheries scientist Peter Moulton, Moulton's interest in the temepreate fish fauna of Australia led to the discovery of this species.

== Description ==
Moulton's handfish is characterised by having a large, variably sized esca which is typically more than half the length of the thick and fleshy illicium. There are some small spines in the skin on the lower half of the illicium. The body is covered in closely set but non overlapping scales which have long two pointed spinules growing from their bases near the margins, these tiny spines sit close to the scale surface. The second dorsal fin contains 15 or 16 soft rays and the anal fin contains 7 or 8 soft rays. The overall colour of the upper body is pale pink with dark colour on the outer parts of the fin membranes of the dorsal, caudal and pelvic fins. This species has a maximum published Standard length of 4.5 cm (1.8 in).

== Distribution ==
Moulton's handfish is endemic to southeastern Australia where it has been recorded from five separate locations. These are east of Cape Howe, New South Wales, south-east of Lakes Entrance, the eastern Bass Strait in Victoria, south of Gabo Island, Victoria and south-east of Cape Barren Island off northern Tasmania. Specimens have been recorded from depths between 125 and 211 m (410 and 692 ft).

== Conservation status ==
Moulton's handfish is a deep living, demersal fish which is found in five known, disparate subpopulations and these are threatened by trawl and dredge fisheries. The species is little known, has not been reported since 2003 and has a very restricted distribution with a very restricted ability to disperse. For these reasons the International Union for Conservation of Nature classify this species as Endangered.
