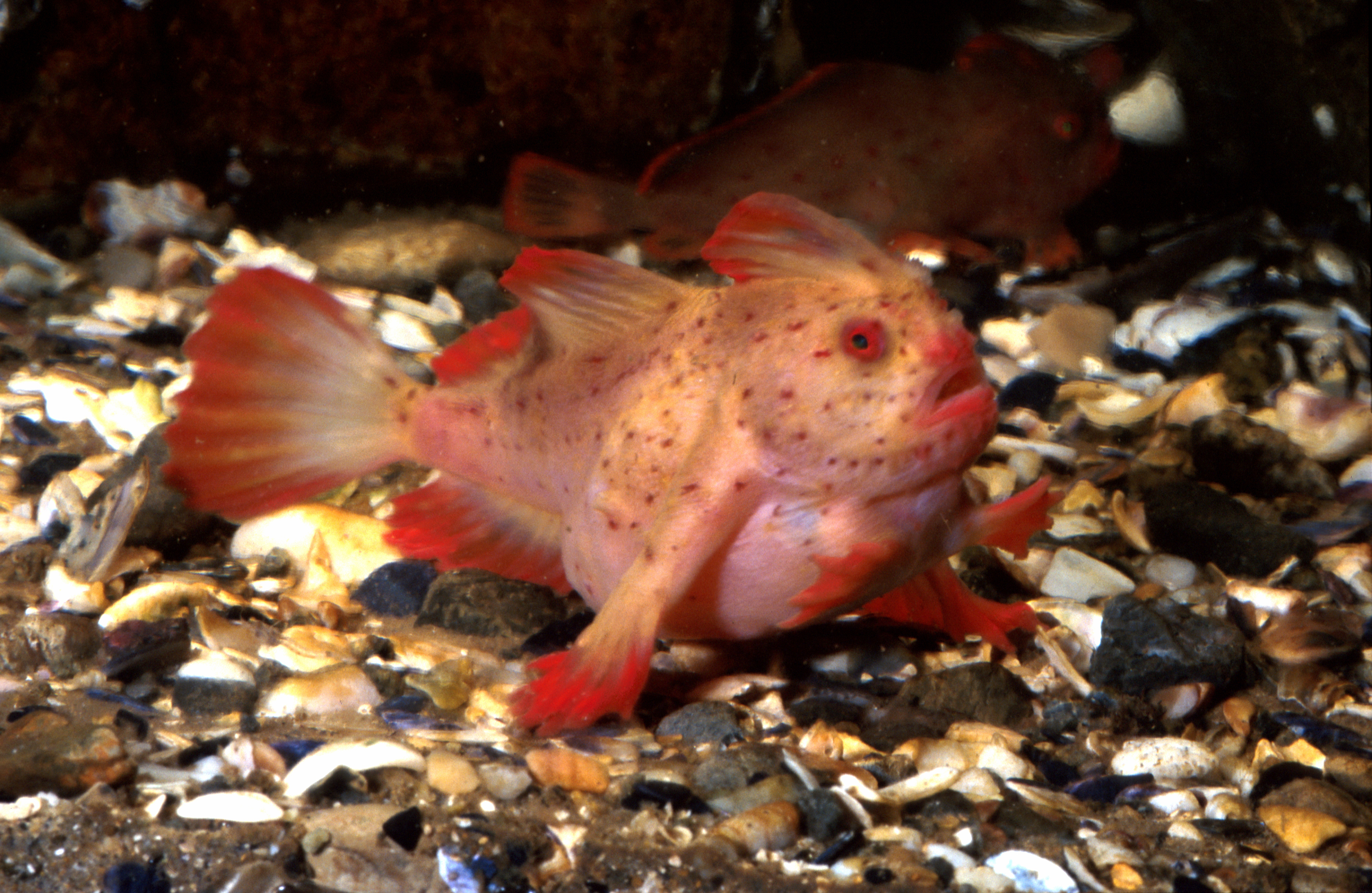

Conservation status
- Critically Endangered (IUCN 3.1)

Scientific classification
- Kingdom: Animalia
- Phylum: Chordata
- Class: Actinopterygii
- Division: Teleostei
- Order: Lophiiformes
- Family: Antennariidae
- Genus: Thymichthys
- Species: T. politus

Binomial name
- Thymichthys politus (Richardson, 1844)

Synonyms
- Cheironectes politus Richardson, 1844; Brachionichthys politus (Richardson, 1844); Sympterichthys politus (Richardson, 1844)

= Red handfish =

Species of fish

The red handfish (Thymichthys politus) is a species of marine ray-finned fishes belonging to the family Brachionichthyidae, the handfishes. Like all members of the handfish family, this fish is endemic to Australia. The IUCN classify the red handfish as critically endangered.

== Taxonomy ==
The red handfish was first formally described as Cheironectes politus in 1844 by Scottish naval surgeon, Arctic explorer, and naturalist John Richardson, with its type locality given as the Actaeon Islands off Tasmania. When Australian zoologists Peter R. Last and Daniel C. Gledhill created the new genus Thymichthys, they designated Cheironectes politus as the type species. This genus is classified within the family Brachionichthyidae, which the 5th edition of Fishes of the World classifies the family Brachionichthyidae within the suborder Antennarioidei within the order Lophiiformes, the anglerfishes.

== Etymology ==
The red handfish has the genus name Thymichthys, from the Greek thymos, meaning "warty growths", and ichthys, meaning "fish". This is an allusion to the warty protuberances on the skin of this fish. The specific name, politus, means "polished", an allusion Richardson did not explain, but is thought to be due to the smoothness of its skin to the touch or its bright colouration.

== Description ==
The red handfish is distinguished by its small, flattened, wart-like protuberances that cover its body and its red colouration. Two colour morphs exist, a bright red morph with red colour on both body and fins, with a black line separating the white fin edges, and a mottled morph with pink body covered in many red patches, with translucent pink fins expressing some bright red patches.

They measure an average standard length of 61.4 mm (2.4 in) and an average total length of 80.1 mm (3.2 in). They use their hand-like fins to crawl rather than swim.

== Ecology and behavior ==
=== Distribution and habitat ===
Historically, the species was found in multiple subpopulations in Tasmania, including Port Arthur, Fortescue Bay, the Actaeon Islands, D'Entrecasteaux Channel, and the Forestier Peninsula. Currently, the species has been found only on two small reefs in Frederick Henry Bay. These species typically reside in reef sand junctions, where with an abundance of sand and rocks. The macroalgae that cover the rock allows them to easily blend in with their environment. These reefs measure no more than 50 m in diameter with a circular area of no more than 75 m. It is found at depth ranges from 1 to 20 m deep.

=== Reproduction ===
Their limited range is attributed to the low reproduction and dispersal rate. Unlike other fish, they recruit directly on the benthos. Females lay their eggs at the base of seagrass from August through to October. Each egg mass contains 30-60 eggs that are connected by tubules bound together. These eggs are then guarded by the adults until they hatch.

=== Diet ===
Little is known about their diet, but that it consists of animals that live in the benthos, including small crustaceans and polychaete worms.

== Conservation ==
In November 2023, researchers at Tasmania's Institute for Marine and Antarctic Studies (IMAS) found a cluster of 21 yellow eggs in one of their tanks for red handfish. One of the researchers said, "We're delighted to announce the safe arrival of 21 baby red handfish." This is the second time red handfish have been bred in captivity, with the previous time being in 2021. A successful captive breeding programme has been established at IMAS, which will have bred more than 200 red handfish by the end of 2024. Alongside other conservation measures, efforts are under way to reintroduce red handfish from the breeding programme into the wild in order to support the wild population.

=== Threats ===
General threats to red handfish include small, very fragmented populations and local increases in density of native purple urchins, which overgraze the seaweed habitat required for shelter and spawning for the red handfish. Summer observations of low seaweed on urchin barrens suggest that loss of seaweed habitat might represent a key threat to long-term viability of the population. In addition, the close vicinity of urban development increases the risk of nutrient runoff, pollution, siltation, and turbidity. This results in habitat degradation through the ruin of the red handfish-preferred seaweed habitat. Loss of spawning substrate limits the red handfish as to where their eggs can attach, resulting in the eggs being lost to the current. Limitations include difficulty spotting the species among its habitat. Red handfish may face severe pressure due to direct environmental consequences of warming coastal waters, including potential implications on reproduction, egg development, feeding, and escape reaction, which are currently unknown.

=== Status ===
The red handfish is classed as critically endangered under the Australian Environment Protection and Biodiversity Conservation Act 1999 and by the IUCN, and as endangered under Tasmania's Threatened Species Protection Act 1995.
