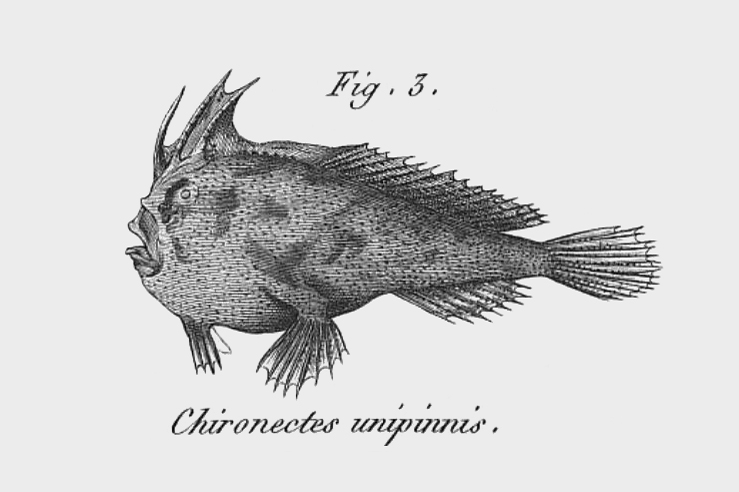
- Sympterichthys unipennis

Scientific classification
- Kingdom: Animalia
- Phylum: Chordata
- Class: Actinopterygii
- Order: Lophiiformes
- Family: Antennariidae
- Subfamily: Brachionichthyinae
- Genus: Sympterichthys; Gill, 1878

Type species
- Lophius laevis Lacépède, 1804

Species
- See text

= Sympterichthys =

Genus of fishes

Sympterichthys is a genus of marine ray-finned fish belonging to the family Brachionichthyidae, the handfishes. These fishes are endemic to Australia.

== Taxonomy ==
Sympterichthys was first proposed as a genus in 1878 by the American biologist Theodore Gill with Lophius laevis, a species described in 1804 by the French naturalist Bernard Germain de Lacépède, as its type species. Lophius naevis was preoccupied by Pierre André Latreille in 1804, so the first available name for this taxon was Chironectes uripennis used by Georges Cuvier in 1817. This genus is classified within the family Brachionichthyidae which the 5th edition of Fishes of the World classifies the family Brachionichthyidae within the suborder Antennarioidei within the order Lophiiformes, the anglerfishes.

== Etymology ==
Sympterichthys is a combination of symphysis, meaning "grown together", with ichthys, meaning "fish". This is a reference to the first dorsal fin spine being connected to the second by a membrane and to the third spine being connected to the second, soft-rayed dorsal fin, by an incised membrane.

== Species ==
Sympterichthys has the following two species classified within it:

- Sympterichthys moultoni Last & Gledhill, 2009 (Moulton's handfish)
- Sympterichthys unipennis (G. Cuvier, 1817) (Smooth handfish) (likely extinct)

== Characteristics ==
Sympterichthys handfishes are characterised within the handfish family by having their skin covered in small embedded scales with flat, single pointed or two pointed small spines that grow out from the rear margin of the scale bases. They do not have any warts or dermal appendages on their skin. Another characteristic is the fleshy Illicium (fish anatomy) is thick with small spines at its base and has a length which is 2.1 to 3 times that of the head, with the esca being large, sometimes greater than half the length of the illicium, although it has a similar thickness. These fishes have maximum published standard length of 4.4 cm (1.7 in) and 4.5 cm (1.8 in).

== Distribution ==
Sympterichthys habdfishes are, like all the handfishes, endemic to Australia. The type species, S. unipennis, is known only from its holotype which was collected from the Australian Sea ("Mer de l'Australie"), thought to be Tasmania. S. moultoni is found off southeastern Australia, as far north as off Cape Howe in New South Wales and south to the Bass Strait off northern Tasmania.
