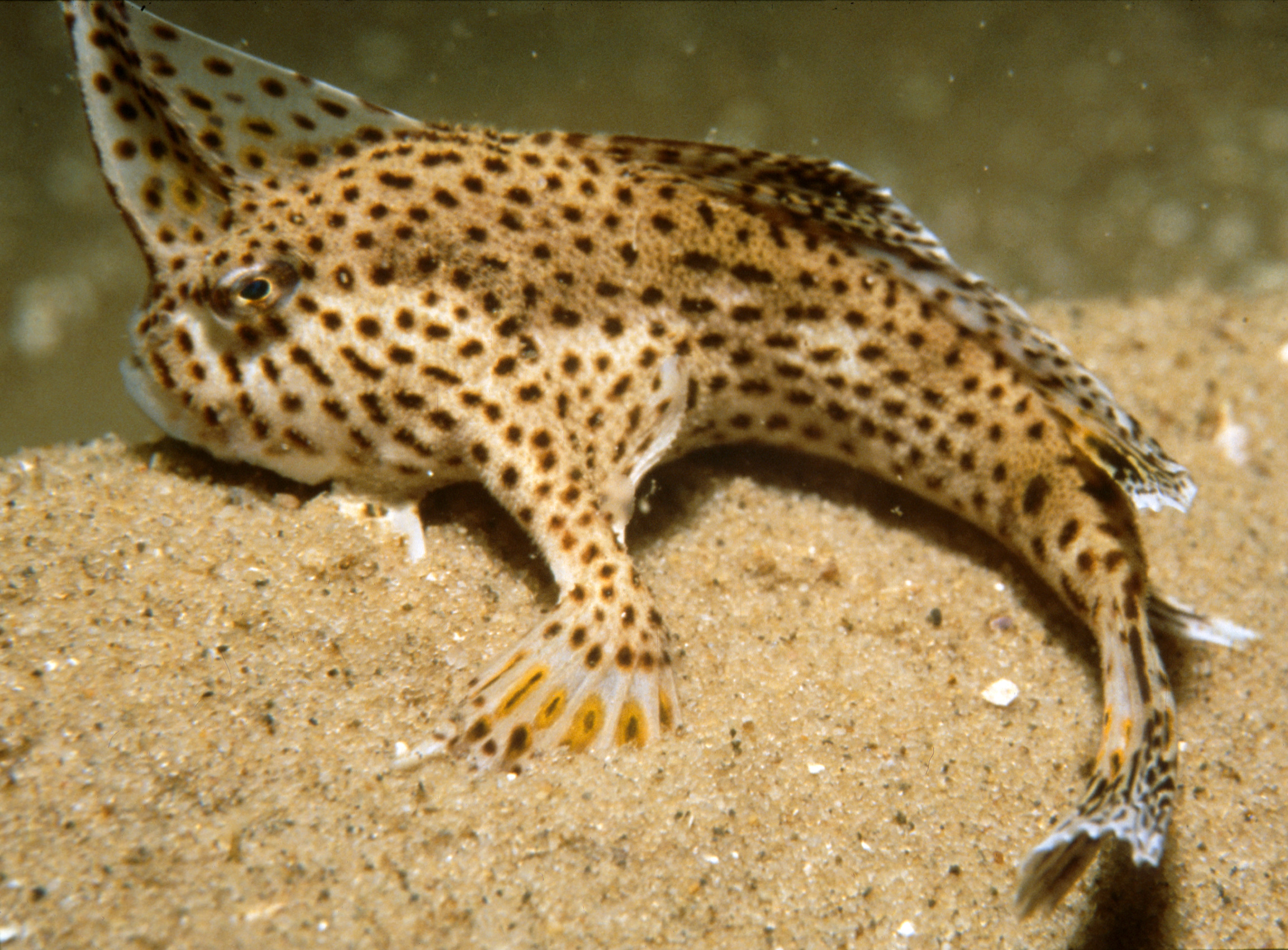
- Brachionichthys hirsutus

Scientific classification
- Kingdom: Animalia
- Phylum: Chordata
- Class: Actinopterygii
- Division: Teleostei
- Order: Lophiiformes
- Family: Antennariidae
- Subfamily: Brachionichthyinae
- Genus: Brachionichthys; Bleeker, 1854

Type species
- Chironectes hirsutus, (same as Lophius hirsutus Lacépède, 1804) Bleeker, 1855

Species
- 2, See text.

= Brachionichthys =

Genus of fishes

Brachionichythys is a genus of marine ray-finned fish belonging to the family Brachionichthyidae, the handfishes. These fishes are confined to the southeastern Indian Ocean and southwestern Pacific Ocean off Australia.

== Taxonomy ==
Brachionichthys was first proposed as a genus in 1854 by the Dutch physician, herpetologist and ichthyologist Pieter Bleeker with Chironectes hirsutus designated as its type species by Bleeker in 1865. C. hirsutus is the same as Lophius hirsutus which was described in 1804 by the French naturalist Bernard Germain de Lacépède with its type locality given as "Côtes sud de l'Australie", probably meaning Tasmania. The 5th edition of Fishes of the World classifies the family Brachionichthyidae within the suborder Antennarioidei within the order Lophiiformes, the anglerfishes.

== Etymology ==
Brachionichthys combines brachium, meaning "arm", an allusion Bleeker did not explain, but it probably refers to the arm-like pectoral fin, with ichthys, meaning "fish".

== Species ==
Brachionichthys contains the following two valid species:

- Brachionichthys australis Last, Gledhill & Holmes, 2007 (Australian spotted handfish)
- Brachionichthys hirsutus Lacépède, 1804 (Spotted handfish)

== Characteristics ==
Brachionichthys handfishes are characterised by having relatively elongate bodies with a long caudal peduncle, the depth being between 28% and 35% of the standard length measured at the origin of the second dorsal fin. The head is slightly compressed, has an oval cross-section, and is relatively small with a small mouth. They are covered in rough skin, in which each scale has a single, upright spine growing from the centre of the scale base. There are dermal appendages on the arm of the pectoral fins, these are sometimes also found on the lower sides of the body. There are no enlarged warts on the skin which is streaked and spotted with black on the body and on the dorsal and caudal fins. The anal fin has between 8 and 11 soft rays, typically 9 or 10. Like other handfishes the fishes in this genus prefer to use their pectoral fins to walk on the substrate rather than swimming, although they are capable of swimming small distances.

== Distribution ==
Brachionichthys handfishes are endemic to the waters of Southern Australia, the hirsute handfish is restricted to Tasmania, while the Australian handfish is found from Brisbane south to Tasmania, east as far as Middini Beach on the Great Australian Bight in Western Australia.
