= Pezichthys =

Scientific classification
- Kingdom: Animalia
- Phylum: Chordata
- Class: Actinopterygii
- Order: Lophiiformes
- Family: Antennariidae
- Subfamily: Brachionichthyinae
- Genus: Pezichthys; Last & Gledhill, 2009

Type species
- Pezichthys amplispinus Last & Gledhill, 2009

Genus of fishes

Pezichthys is a genus of handfishes. The fishes in this genus are endemic to southern Australia; they are all extremely localised in distribution and are rare.

== Taxonomy ==
Pexichthys was first proposed as a genus in 2009 by Australian zoologists Peter R. Last and Daniel C. Gledhill when they described the five species within the genus. They designated P. amplispinus as the type species in the new genus. P. amplispilus was described from a type locality of east of Bermagui, New South Wales. This genus is classified within the family Brachionichthyidae which the 5th edition of Fishes of the World classifies the family Brachionichthyidae within the suborder Antennarioidei within the order Lophiiformes, the anglerfishes.

== Etymology ==
Pezichthys is from the Greek pezo, meaning "walking", and ichthys, "fish". This refers to these fishes using their paired fins, like legs, to walk on the seabed.

== Species ==
Pezichthys with five currently recognised species is the most speciose genus in the frogfish subfamily Brachionichthyinae:

- Pezichthys amplispinus Last & Gledhill, 2009 (cockatoo handfish)
- Pezichthys compressus Last & Gledhill, 2009 (narrowbody handfish)
- Pezichthys eltanani Last & Gledhill, 2009 (Eltanin handfish)
- Pezichthys macropinnis Last & Gledhill, 2009 (longfin handfish)
- Pezichthys nigrocilium Last & Gledhill, 2009 (eyelash handfish)

== Characteristics ==
Pezichthys handfishes are characterised by having relatively deep bodies with a depth as the origin of the second dorsal fin equivalent to 32% to 48% of their standard length. The relatively large head, with a length equivalent to around half the standard length, shows varying degrees of compression. The caudal peduncle may be short to long. The illicium varies from short and robust to thin and tall, between 1.9 times and 3.5 times the length of the esca. The skin is rough to the touch and is covered in small, spiny scales. These small spines have two points, point straight out, and are placed close to the centre of the scale base. The scale bases are star-shaped or roughly circular and are embedded in the skins, although the small spines fork well above skin surface. If dermal appendages are present, they are typically restricted to arm-like pectoral fins. No wart-like protuberances occur on the skin and the sensory scales are variably delineated. They tend to be uniform in colour, with small markings or with a floral pattern. Seven rays are in the pectoral fins and between seven and nine soft rays are in the anal fin, usually eight. These handfishes are small, with the largest species being P. amlispinus with a maximum published standard length of 4.6 cm (1.8 in).

== Distribution ==
Pezichthys handfishes are all endemic to southern Australia and Tasmania. Each species has a very restricted known distribution. P. amplispinus is known from five locations off Victoria and New South Wales, P. compressus is known from 2 locations off Victoria, P. eltanani from one location off eastern Tasmania (with another unknown location), P. macropinnis from a single location off South Australia, and P. nigrocilium has been recorded from a single locality off western Tasmania.

== Conservation statuses ==
Pezichthys handfishes are classified as either data deficient or endangered by the International Union for Conservation of Nature. P. amplispinusand P. compressus are classified as endangered while P. eltanini, P. macropinnis and P. nigrocilium are Data Deficient.
