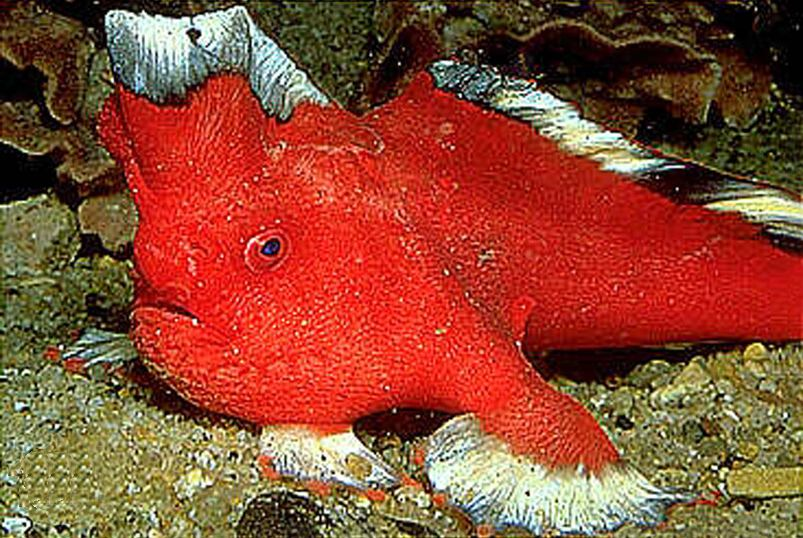
- Red handfish (Thymichthys politus)

Scientific classification
- Kingdom: Animalia
- Phylum: Chordata
- Class: Actinopterygii
- Order: Lophiiformes
- Family: Antennariidae
- Subfamily: Brachionichthyinae
- Genus: Thymichthys; Last & Gledhill, 2009

Type species
- Cheironectes politus Richardson, 1844

Species
- See text

= Thymichthys =

Genus of fishes

Thymichthys is a genus of marine ray-finned fishes belonging to the family Brachionichthyidae, the handfishes. Like all members of the handfish family these fishes are endemic to Australia.

== Taxonomy ==
Thymichthys was first proposed as a genus in 2009 by the Australian zoologists Peter R. Last and Daniel C. Gledhill when they reviewed the family Brachionichthyidae. Cheironectes politus, which was described in 1844 by the Scottish naturalist and explorer John Richardson from the Actaeon Islands in the D'Entrecasteaux Channel off Tasmania, was designated as the type species. This genus is classified within the family Brachionichthyidae which the 5th edition of Fishes of the World classifies the family Brachionichthyidae within the suborder Antennarioidei within the order Lophiiformes, the anglerfishes.

== Etymology ==
Thymichthys is a combination of thymos, meaning "warty growths", and ichthys, which means "fish". This is an allusion to the warty protuberances on the skin of this fish.

== Species ==
Thymichthys contains the following two species:

- Thymichthys politus (Richardson, 1844) (Red handfish)
- Thymichthys verrucosus (McCulloch & Waite, 1918) (Warty handfish)

== Characteristics ==
Thymichthys handfish are separated from the other handfish genera by the possession of wart-like bumps, clearly marked sensory scales and dermal appendages on the skin.

They also have a comparatively deeper body. the depth at the second dorsal fin being between 32% and 52% of the standard length. The body varies in shape from almost triangular to elongate with a slightly compressed cross-section and they have a short caudal peduncle. Their illicium may be thick or thin and is around 2 to 3.5 times the length of the head and 4 times the length of the esca. The surface of the skin is typically smooth with a scattering of embedded scales. These scales bear short, rearwards pointing and adpressed spinules which have a single or double point and the scales have irregularly shaped bases. They usually have vividly coloured bodies, strongly patterned with spots, blotches and reticulations. The species in this genus have maximum published lengths of around 9 cm (3.5 in).

== Distribution ==
Thymichthys handfish are endemic to the temperate waters of Australia where they are found from Wilson Bluff on the Great Australian Bight east to New South Wales and south to Tasmania.
