= Culdesac Tempe =

Car-free neighborhood in the U.S.

- Neighborhood
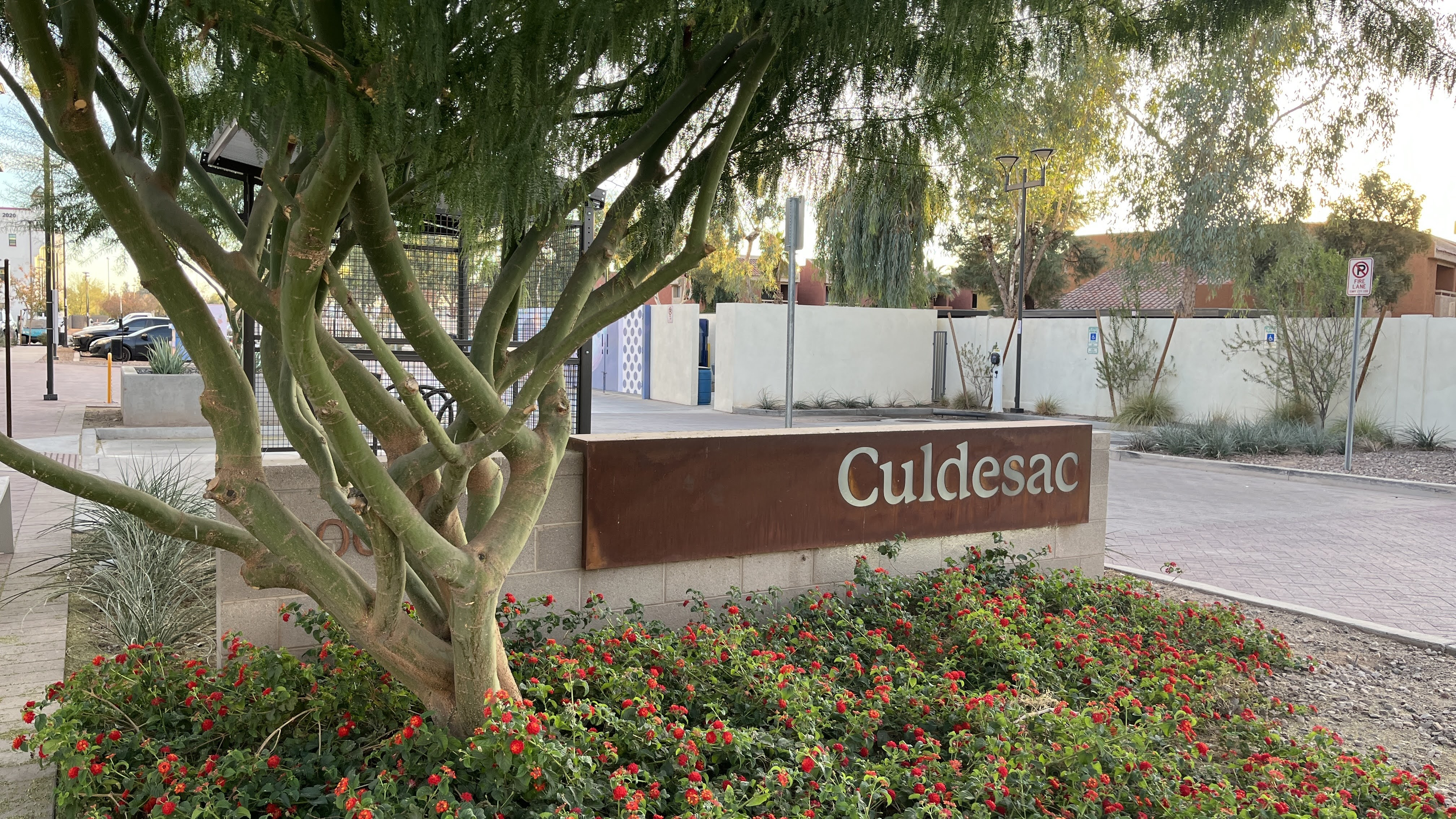
- Interactive map of Culdesac Tempe
- Coordinates: 33.4145°N 111.8994°W
- State: Arizona
- Greater Metropolitan Area: Phoenix
- City: Tempe
- Founded: 2023
- Founder: Ryan Johnson

Culdesac Tempe is a car-free mixed-use development in Tempe, Arizona that began construction in 2023.

Culdesac Tempe is a car-free neighborhood in the U.S. housing 1000 residents when completed but with no accommodation for the cars of inhabitants. It is located in Tempe, Arizona about 2 miles (3.2 km) from downtown and is the first project of the startup Culdesac. Construction of the neighborhood began in 2019, was estimated to cost $140 million, span 16 acres (6.5 ha), and include 636 apartment units and 24,000 square feet (2,200 m^{2}) of restaurant and retail space.

Residents in most of the Phoenix metro area rely heavily on personal vehicles for transportation. Culdesac is claiming it will eliminate the need for cars by locating most necessary services within the neighborhood and relying on public transportation expansions to connect with the rest of the city. The ban on parking spaces is intended by the developers to leave opportunities for green space including courtyards and gardens.

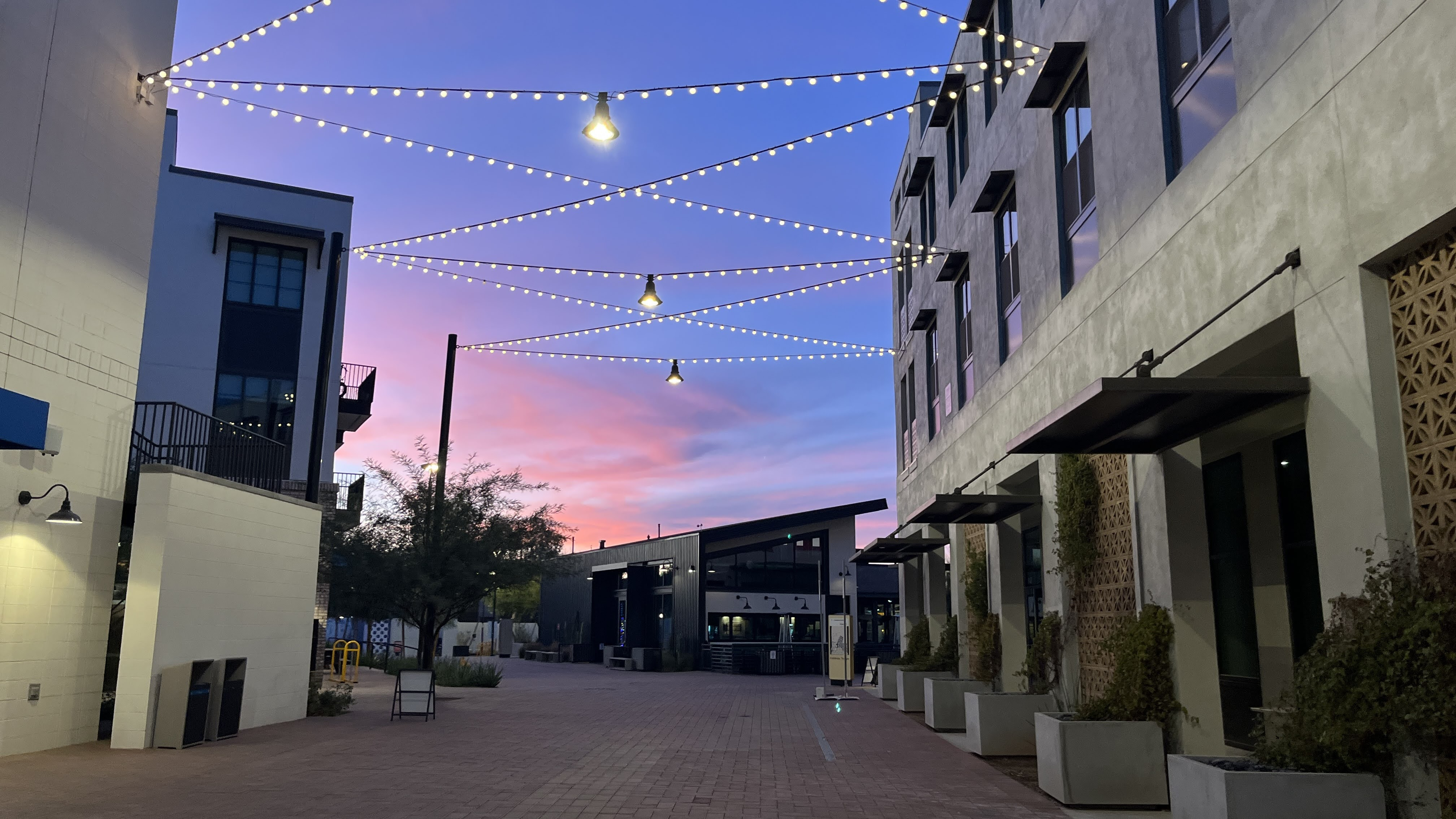
Walking through Culdesac Tempe at twilight

== See also ==
- Phoenix metropolitan area
