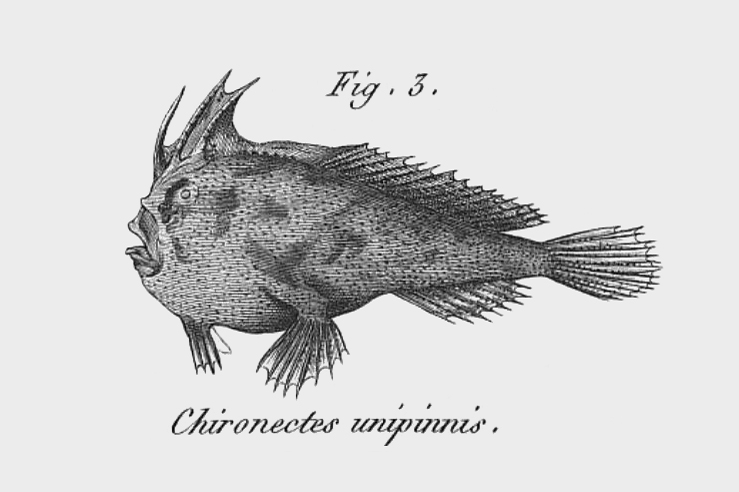

Conservation status
- Data Deficient (IUCN 3.1)

Scientific classification
- Kingdom: Animalia
- Phylum: Chordata
- Class: Actinopterygii
- Division: Teleostei
- Order: Lophiiformes
- Family: Antennariidae
- Genus: Sympterichthys
- Species: S. unipennis

Binomial name
- Sympterichthys unipennis (Cuvier, 1817)

Synonyms
- Lophius laevis Lacépède, 1804; Chironectes unipennis Cuvier, 1817; Brachionichthys unipennis (Cuvier, 1817)

= Smooth handfish =

Extinct species of fish

The smooth handfish (Sympterichthys unipennis) is a possibly extinct species of handfish in the genus Sympterichthys. It was likely endemic to waters off the coast of Tasmania, mainly the D'Entrecasteaux Channel. It was declared extinct by the IUCN Red List in 2020, marking the first entirely marine fish classified as such. However, in 2021 its status was changed to Data Deficient due to uncertainties over the exhaustiveness of the unsuccessful surveys to find this species. It is known only from its holotype collected by French explorers in 1802.

The smooth handfish was first formally described as Lophius laevis in 1804 by the French naturalist Bernard Germain de Lacépède; this name however was preoccupied by Lophius laevis described by Pierre André Latreille, also in 1804. The next available name was Chironectes unipennis which was coined by Georges Cuvier in 1817. In 1878 the American biologist Theodore Gill classified Lacépède's L. laevis in the new genus Sympterichthys. The genus Sympterichthys is classified within the family Brachionichthyidae which the 5th edition of Fishes of the World classifies the family Brachionichthyidae within the suborder Antennarioidei within the order Lophiiformes, the anglerfishes.

In the past, it was likely reasonably common, as it was one of the first fish described on François Péron's 1802 survey of Australia and an individual was caught with a simple dipnet; this is the only known specimen of the species. When and how the species went extinct is relatively unclear, but it likely had to do with the intensive scallop and oyster harvesting that went on in the area between the 19th and mid-20th centuries which dredged every part of the channel, resulting in the destruction of critical habitat that the benthic handfish required.
