= Ziebell's handfish =

Conservation status
- Critically Endangered (IUCN 3.1)

Scientific classification
- Kingdom: Animalia
- Phylum: Chordata
- Class: Actinopterygii
- Division: Teleostei
- Order: Lophiiformes
- Family: Antennariidae
- Genus: Brachiopsilus
- Species: B. ziebelli

Binomial name
- Brachiopsilus ziebelli Last & Gledhill, 2009

Species of fish

Ziebell's handfish (Brachiopsilus ziebelli) is a species of marine ray-finned fish belonging to the family Brachionichthyidae, the handfishes. This species is endemic to eastern and southern Tasmania. It is a very rare species and the International Union for Conservation of Nature classifies it as Critically Endangered.

== Taxonomy ==
Ziebell's handfish was first formally described in 2009 by the Australian zoologists Peter R. Last and Daniel C. Gledhill, its type locality being given as the Actaeon Islands in the D'Entrecasteaux Channel off Tasmania, when they described three new species within the new genus Brachiopsilus. When they proposed this new genus they designated B. ziebelli as the type species. The genus Brachiopsilus is classified within the family Brachionichthyidae which the 5th edition of Fishes of the World classifies the family Brachionichthyidae within the suborder Antennarioidei within the order Lophiiformes, the anglerfishes.

== Etymology ==
Ziebell's handfish has the genus name Brachiopsilus, which is a combination of brachium, which means "arm", and psilos, meaning "bare" or "smooth". This is an allusion to the smooth skin on the body and the arm-like pectoral fin. Its specific name honours the professional scuba diver Allan Ziebell who collected the type specimens while abalone fishing. Ziebell retained the fishes in his home aquarium before donating them to Last and Gledhill for their research

== Description ==
Ziebell's handfish has a small esca which has a length that is equivalent to 19-32% of that of the rather thick and fleshy Illicium (fish anatomy). The illicium is between 2.4 and 3 times the length of the head and is markedly longer than the second spine in the dorsal fin. It has a bulging head with small eyes and a wide mouth which has fleshy lips which show folds in their skin. Adults are scaleless, except for the lateral line. Thereare between 16 and 18 soft rays in the second dorsal fin and the anal fin has 9 or 10 soft rays. The caudal peduncle is short and the caudal fin is small. This species has a maximum published standard length of 11.7 cm (4.6 in) The overall colour is pinkish to whitish marked on the upper body and flanks with irregularly shaped blotches which vary in colour from brownish to purplish. The fins are bright yellow and this yellow sometimes extends onto adjacent parts of the body.

== Distribution and habitat ==
Ziebell's handfish is endemic to the waters off eastern and southern Tasmania. here it has been recorded from the D'Entrecasteaux Channel, Cox Bight, and off the Forestier and Tasman Peninsulas. It is associated with reefs in water as shallow as 3 m (9.8 ft) and is thought to reach depths of as much as 40 m (130 ft). It is mainly recorded from rocky substrates with dense growth of sessil invertebrates, such as sponges, and seaweeds and the most frequent records came from rock shelves with dense growth of ascidians, bryozoans and sponges.

== Biology ==
Ziebell's handfish is little known, it is thought that its diet is made up of small invertebrates, like crustaceans and worms. The females lay egg masses close to sponges and on hatching the young fish, not larvae. settle on the substrate in the immediate vicinity of the egg mass.

== Conservation ==
Ziebell's handfish is very rare and, as of December 2021, listed as critically endangered on the IUCN Red List, and Vulnerable under Australia's Environment Protection and Biodiversity Conservation Act 1999 (EPBC Act). It is listed as Endangered under Tasmania's Threatened Species Protection Act 1995, and all handfish species are protected under the Tasmanian Living Marine Resources Management Act 1995, which prohibits their collection in State waters without a permit. The last confirmed sighting of Ziebell's handfish was in 2007 and the species may be extinct.
