= Brachiopsilus =

Scientific classification
- Kingdom: Animalia
- Phylum: Chordata
- Class: Actinopterygii
- Order: Lophiiformes
- Family: Antennariidae
- Subfamily: Brachionichthyinae
- Genus: Brachiopsilus; Last & Gledhill, 2009

Type species
- Brachiopsilus ziebelli Last & Gledhill, 2009

Species
- see taxt

Genus of fishes

Brachiopsilus is a genus of marine ray-finned fishes belonging to family Brachionichthyidae, the handfishes. The fishes in this genus are endemic to Australia.

== Taxonomy ==
Brachiopsilus was first proposed as a genus in 2009 by the Australian zoologists Peter R. Last and Daniel C. Gledhill when they described the three species within the genus. They designated B. ziebelli as the type species in the new genus. This genus is classified within the family Brachionichthyidae which the 5th edition of Fishes of the World classifies the family Brachionichthyidae within the suborder Antennarioidei within the order Lophiiformes, the anglerfishes.

== Etymology ==
Brachiopsilus is a combination of brachium, which means "arm", and psilos, meaning "bare" or "smooth". This is an allusion to the smooth skin on the body and the arm-like pectoral fin.

== Species ==
Brachiopsilus currently has 3 recognised species within it:

- Brachiopsilus dianthus Last & Gledhill, 2009 (Pink handfish)
- Brachiopsilus dossenus Last & Gledhill, 2009 (Humpback handfish)
- Brachiopsilus ziebelli Last & Gledhill, 2009 (Ziebell's handfish)

== Characteristics ==
Brachiopsilus handfishes are characterised by having a relatively deep body, the depth of the body at the origin of the second dorsal fin being equivalent to 31% to 43% of the standard length. They have large heads, the length of the head is equivalent to between 43% and 58% of the standard length and is slightly compressed in cross section. They have rather short caudal peduncles. The illicium may be short or long but is thin and is between 3 and 5 times the length of the esca. They have thick skin which is smooth but may have low ridges within it but does not have any enlarged, fleshy warts on it. The body or fins are brightly coloured or may have a strong pattern of speckles. The pectoral fin typically has 9 fin rays, sometimes 10 and 9 or 10 soft rays in the anal fin. Th smallest fish in the genus is the humpback handfish (B. dossenus) with a maximum published standard length of 6.5 cm (2.6 in) while the largest is Ziebell's handfish (B. ziebelli) with a maximum published standard length of 11.7 cm (4.6 in).

== Distribution ==
Brachiopsilus handfishes are endemic to southern Australia where they are found off the coasts of Victoria and Tasmania.
