= Ropid =

Ropid is a tiny robot designed and developed by Tomotaka Takahashi of Robo Garage at Kyoto University. The name of the robot is a combination of Robot and Rapid.

Ropid is a carbon fiber and plastic android that weighs 3.5 pounds. The robot has four onboard gyro sensors and four accelerometers that allow it to operate. This robot can respond to voice commands and has a mouth that moves when it speaks.

In addition to its communication features, the Ropid can walk, run, and jump faster than many other similarity constructed robots. Ropid uses the "bent knees" method to balance, but appears lifelike because of the speed of its movements. Ropid can jump up to three inches off the ground.

== Specification ==
Name	Ropid
Height	38 cm
DOF	30
