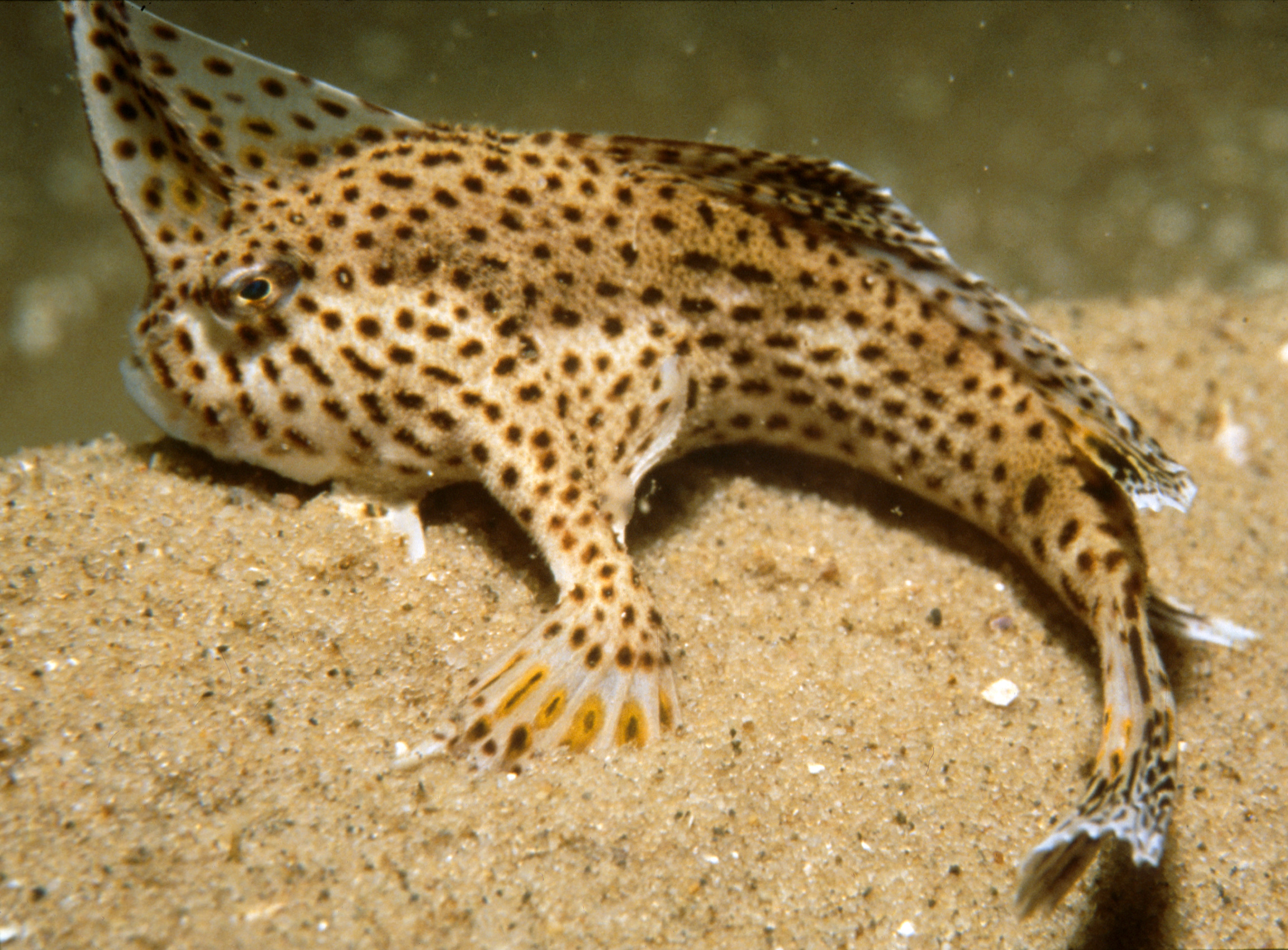

Conservation status
- Critically Endangered (IUCN 3.1)

Scientific classification
- Kingdom: Animalia
- Phylum: Chordata
- Class: Actinopterygii
- Division: Teleostei
- Order: Lophiiformes
- Family: Antennariidae
- Genus: Brachionichthys
- Species: B. hirsutus

Binomial name
- Brachionichthys hirsutus (Lacépède, 1804)

Synonyms
- Lophius hirsutus Lacépède, 1804; Chironectes punctatus Cuvier, 1817

= Spotted handfish =

Species of fish

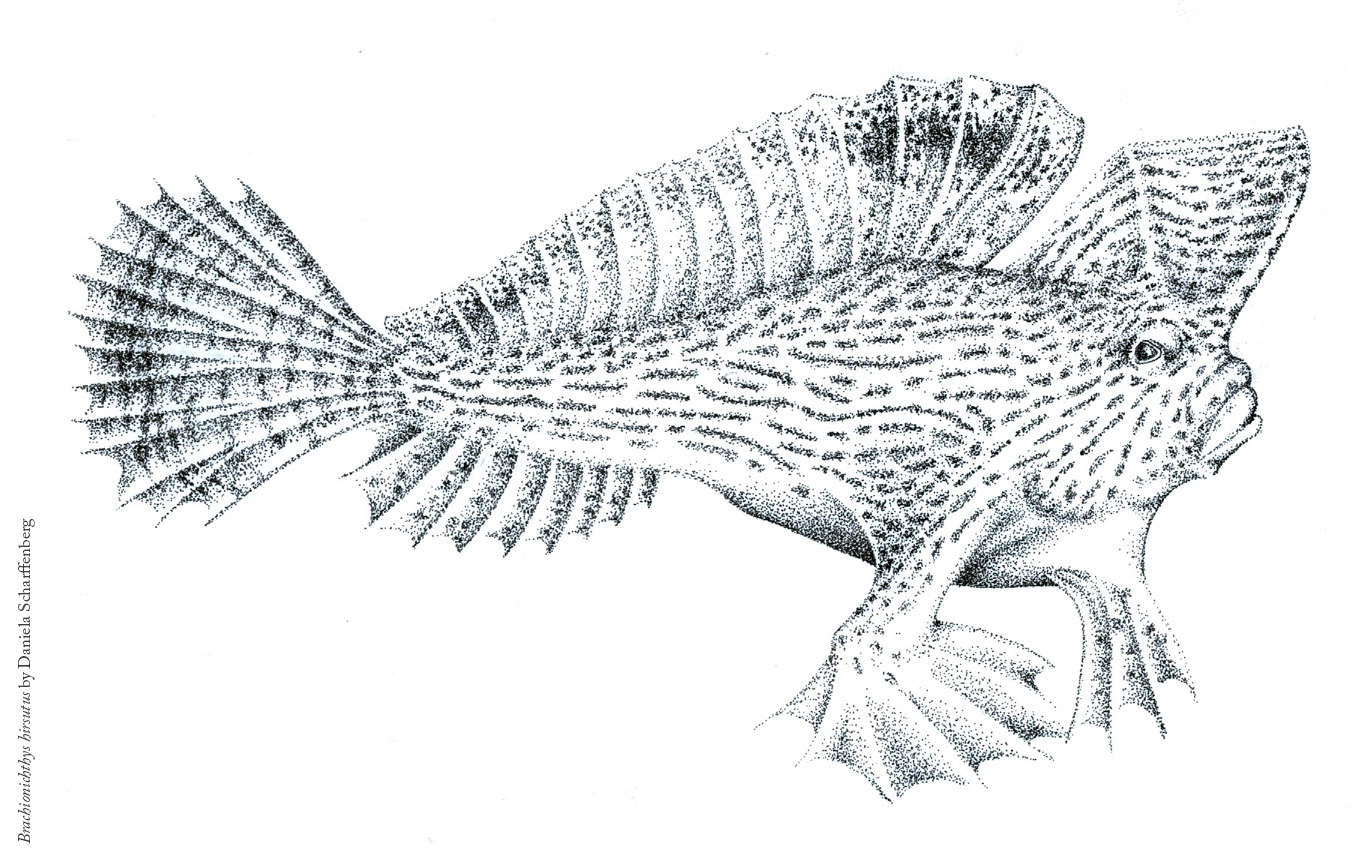
Drawing of the spotted handfish

The spotted handfish (Brachionichthys hirsutus) is a rare Australian fish in the handfish family, Brachionichthyidae, classified as critically endangered on the IUCN Red List 2020. It has a highly restricted range, being found only in the estuary of River Derwent, Tasmania, and nearby areas, with the main threat to its existence being an invasive species, the Northern Pacific seastar (Asterias amurensis).

The spotted handfish is an unusual fish, in that it has highly adapted pectoral fins, which appear like hands (hence the name) and allow it to walk on the sea floor.

== Taxonomy ==
The spotted handfish was first formally described as Lophius hirsutus in 1804 by the French naturalist Bernard Germain de Lacépède with its type locality given as "Côtes sud de l'Australie", probably meaning Tasmania. In 1854 Pieter Bleeker proposed a new monospecific genus for L. hirsutus, Brachionichthys, so this species is the type species of that genus by monotypy. The 5th edition of Fishes of the World classifies the genus Brachionichthys, this species being one of two species within that genus, in the family Brachionichthyidae, the handfishes.

== Etymology ==
The spotted handfish has the genus name Brachionichthys, which is a combination of brachium, meaning "arm", an allusion not explained by Bleeker, but it probably refers to the arm-like pectoral fin, with ichthys, meaning "fish". The specific name, hirsutus, means "hairy", and is a reference to skin being at least partially covered with small spines.

== Description ==
The spotted handfish is a rare species in the handfish family, Brachionichthyidae.

The handfishes are a unique, Australian family of anglerfish, the most speciose of the few marine fish families endemic to Australia. Handfish are unusual, small (up to 120 millimetres (4.7 in) in length), slow-moving, fishes that prefer to 'walk' rather than swim. Their pectoral fins are leg-like with extremities resemblant of a sort-of hand (hence their common name). The females are believed to reach sexual maturity after two to three years at lengths of 75 millimetres (3.0 in) to 80 millimetres (3.1 in).

== Habitat ==
The spotted handfish is a benthic fish usually found at depths of 5 metres (16 ft) to 10 metres (33 ft), with overall sightings varying from a minimum of 2 metres (6 ft 7 in) to a maximum of 5 metres (16 ft) deep.

It chooses habitats based on the microhabitat features. It tends to prefer complex habitats with features such as depressions and ripple formations filled with shells to avoid predators.

== Reproduction ==
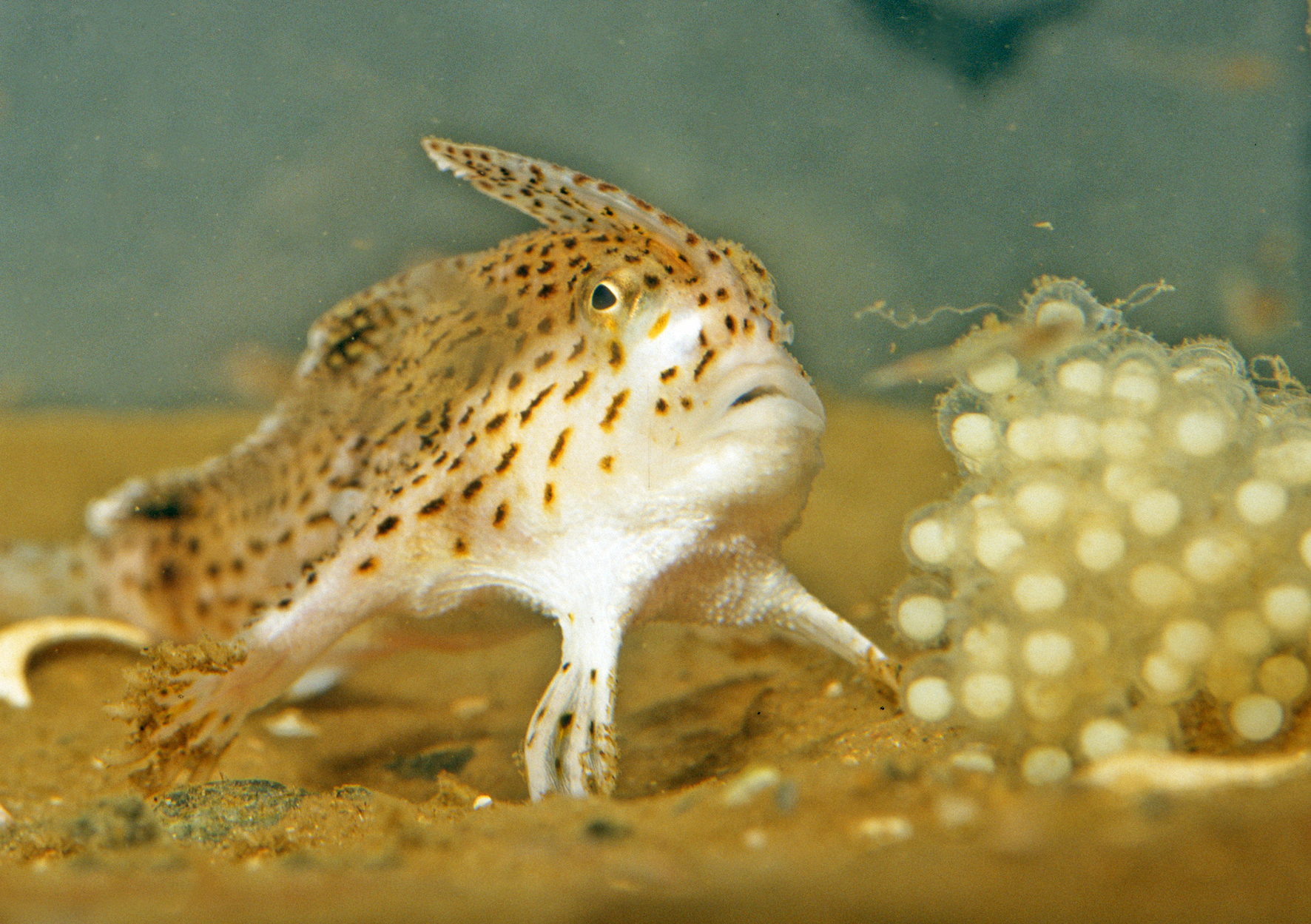
Female spotted handfish with her eggs

The species spawns sometime during September and October. Females lay a number of eggs varying from 80 to 250 eggs on a variety of vertical objects, including sea grasses, sponges, macrophytic algae, polychaete worm tubes, and stalked ascidians. The eggs are large in diameter measuring approximately 3–4 mm. Handfish have a short pelagic larval period; their eggs hatch after 7–8 weeks as fully formed juveniles (6–7 mm SL).

B. hirsutus will select its desired habitat when breeding season occurs. Due to the low movement range of the B. hirsutus from its chosen habitat, encountering other B. hirsutus becomes rare and lessens the probability of mating. This leads to potential risks of alleles effects on the populations due to low reproduction. Some B. hirsutus are also forced to increase effort in finding a mate due to the low movement range.

== Diet ==
Little is known regarding their diet, but they have been known to prey on small shellfish, shrimp, and polychaete worms in the wild. When captive in aquaria, spotted handfish eat mysid shrimp, amphipods, and small live fish. Newly hatched handfish have been observed to do quite well on a diet of small amphipods.

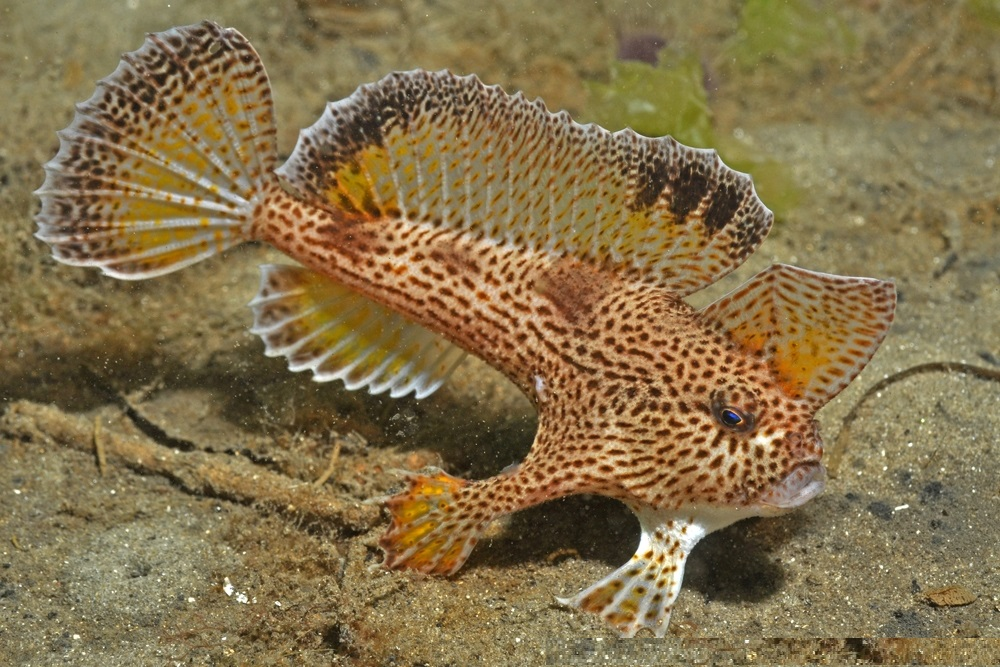
The critically endangered spotted handfish

== Conservation ==
In 1996, the spotted handfish was the first marine fish to be listed as critically endangered in the IUCN Red List, and is still classified as such (as of 2021, last assessed 2018). It has the same classification under Australia's Environment Protection and Biodiversity Conservation Act 1999 (EPBC Act), and as Endangered under Tasmania's Threatened Species Protection Act 1995. All handfish species are protected under the Tasmanian Living Marine Resources Management Act 1995, which prohibits their collection in State waters without a permit.

The most urgent matter concerning the survival of the species is to address the threat posed by the presence of an introduced species of seastar, the Northern Pacific seastar (Asterias amurensis), which prey on not only the fish eggs, but also on the sea squirts (ascidians) that help to form the substrate that the fish spawn on. Since the seastar, native to Japanese waters, was established in the Derwent River and estuary in the 1980s, efforts have been made to control its spread in Australia.
