= Pedestrian village =

Urban planning for mixed-use areas prioritising pedestrians

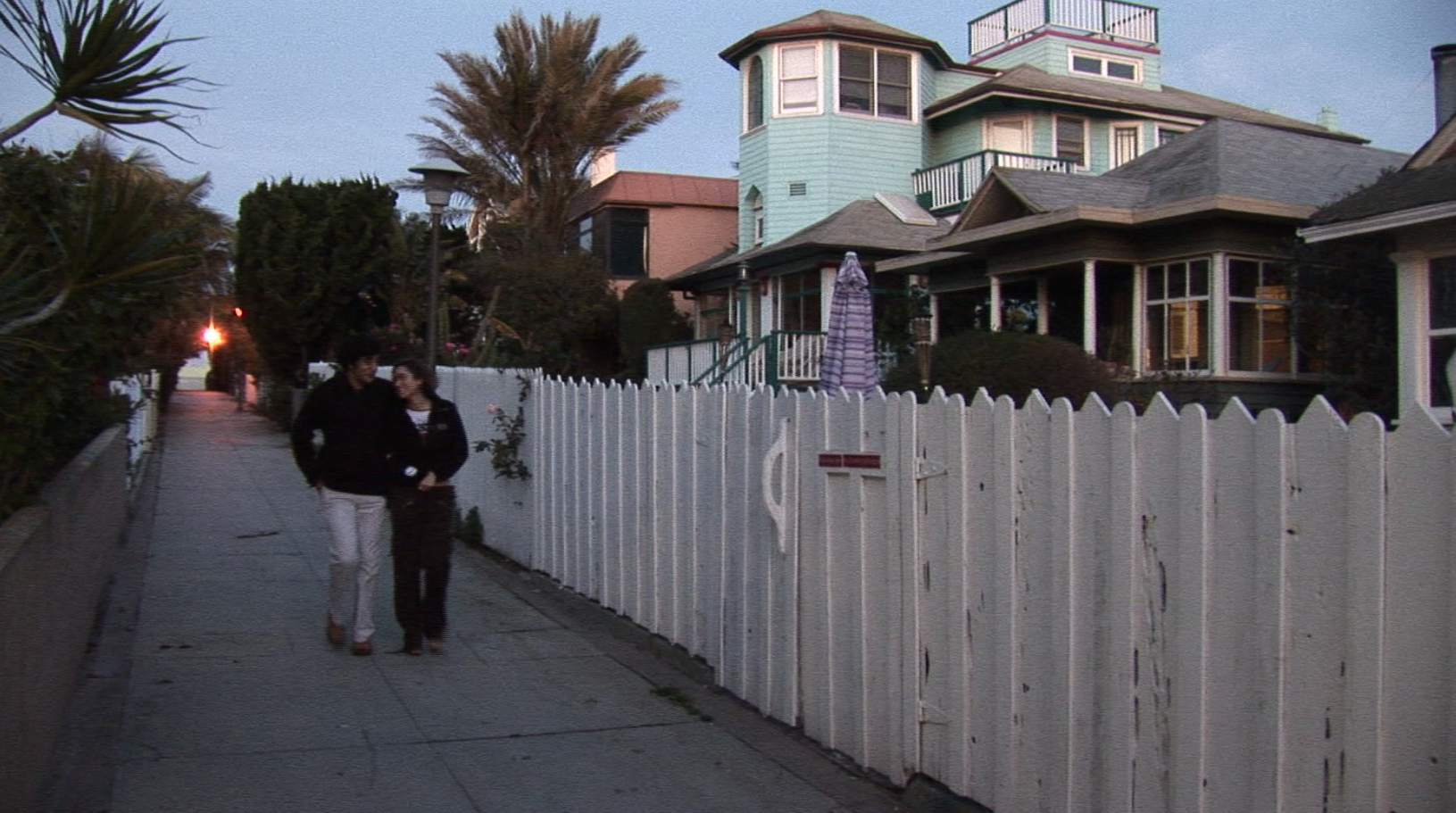
A walk street in Venice, California, built around 1905

A pedestrian village is a compact, pedestrian-oriented neighborhood or town with a mixed-use village center. Shared-use lanes for pedestrians and those using bicycles, Segways, wheelchairs, and other small rolling conveyances that do not use internal combustion engines. Generally, these lanes are in front of the houses and businesses, and streets for motor vehicles are always at the rear. Some pedestrian villages might be nearly car-free with cars either hidden below the buildings, or on the boundary of the village. Venice, Italy is essentially a pedestrian village with canals. Other examples of a pedestrian village include Giethoorn village located in the Dutch province of Overijssel, Netherlands, Mont-Tremblant Pedestrian Village located beside Mont-Tremblant, Quebec, Canada, and Culdesac Tempe in Tempe, Arizona.

The canal district in Venice, California, on the other hand, combines the front lane/rear street approach with canals and walkways, or just walkways.

== See also ==
- 15 minute city – Urban accessibility concept
- Active living – Physically active way of life
- Active mobility – Unmotorised transport powered by activity
- Compact city – High density mixed use transit oriented planning
- List of car-free islands
- New Urbanism
- Obesity and walking
- Principles of intelligent urbanism
- Sustainable Development Goal 11 – 11th of 17 Sustainable Development Goals for sustainable cities
- Urban vitality
- Walkability
- Walking audit
- Walking city

Infrastructure:

- Automotive city – Urban planning prioritising automobiles
- Bicycle-friendly – Urban planning prioritising cycling
- Carfree city – Urban area absent of motor vehicles
- Compact city – High density mixed use transit oriented planning
- Complete streets – Transportation policy and design approach
- Cycling infrastructure – Facilities for use by cyclists
- Esplanade – Long, open, level area near a river or larger water body
- Pedestrian zone – Urban car-free area reserved for pedestrian use
- Transit-oriented development – Urban planning prioritising transit
- Transit village – Urban planning prioritising transit and pedestrians
