= Walkable city =

City design that prioritizes pedestrians

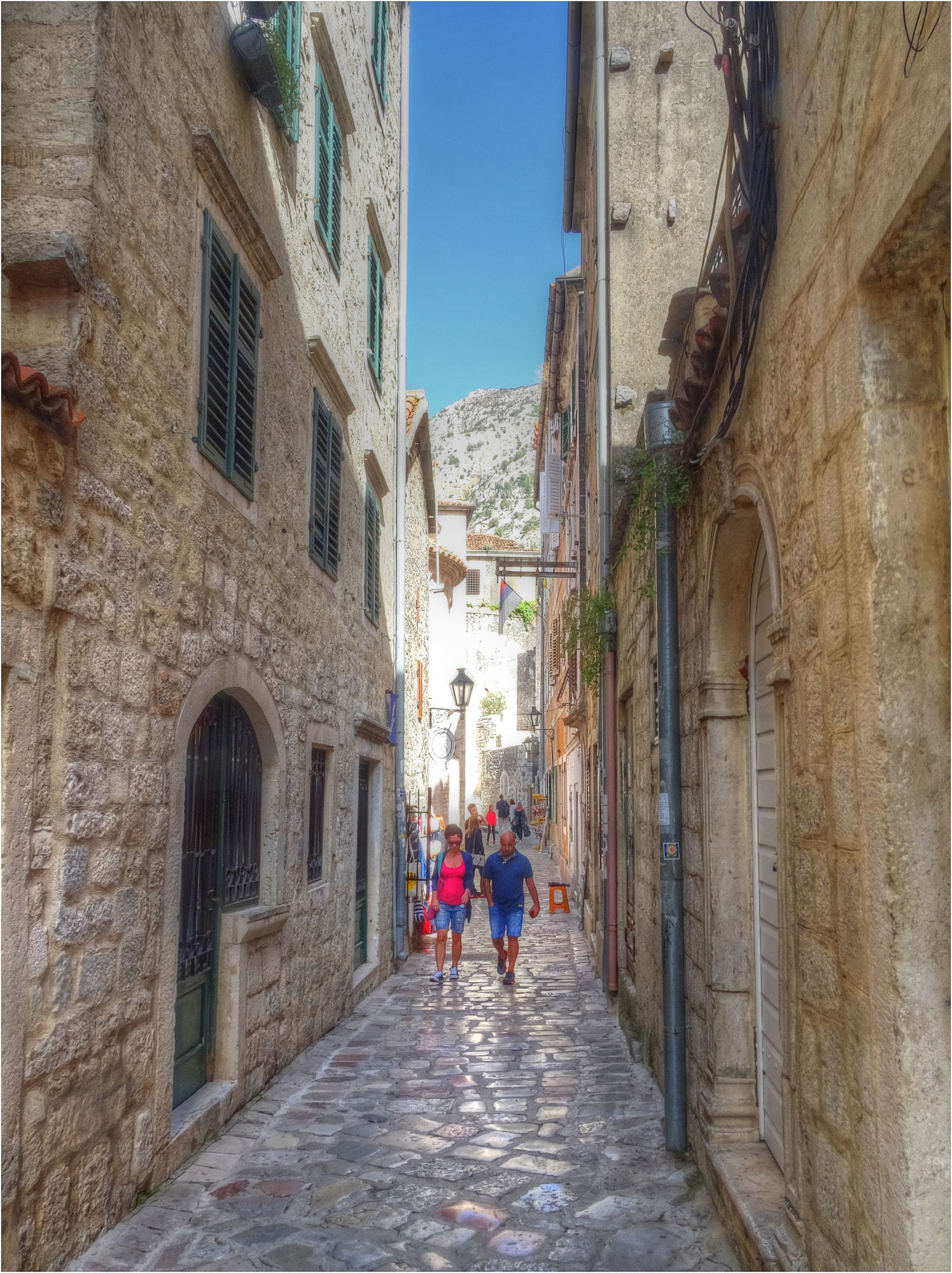
Narrow streets are a common feature in walking cities, where space is at a premium.

A walkable city or walking city is one that minimizes the need for vehicular transportation and encourages travel on foot. They are often characterized by narrow, winding streets. A walkable city provides a more-equitable form of mobility than contemporary automotive cities, with fewer residents disadvantaged by limited transport options. A higher degree of walkability between areas of a city has been shown to promote a wide range of benefits for inhabitants, including increased equity, sustainability, health, social benefits, economic development, and reduced demand for other modes of transportation.

== History ==
Walkable cities were common before the adoption of machine-powered transportation. Street patterns evolved along desire lines, allowing people to travel the shortest-possible distance. In the reconstruction after the Great Fire of London (1666), the polymath Robert Hooke and others proposed redesigning the streets of the City of London on a grid pattern with wide boulevards and arteries. The king decided both the prospective cost of building and compensation, and the need to quickly restore trade and residential population, meant the city would be rebuilt on the original property lines.

In Europe, the walking city was the commonest layout until about 1850, when collective means of transportation, such as trams began replacing walking and horse-drawn travel. Around the world, many walking cities became dominated by motor traffic during the 1950s and 1960s. This caused cities to change their layouts to be centred around heavy automotive infrastructure. However, after having previously replaced much of their pedestrian infrastructure, some cities – such as Freiburg and Munich in Germany, and Copenhagen in Denmark – gradually re-implemented their walkable qualities.

Walking cities in the United States also became less common following the adoption of automotive transport and were largely transformed into low-density, expansive metropolitan regions, which are often described as urban sprawl. American suburbs, which surround most large cities in the US, largely fail to provide adequate amenities within a reasonable walking distance. While there are opportunities for leisure walks around many neighborhoods, there is often still a need to visit the city centre to access amenities such as healthcare, grocery stores, work opportunities, or education.

== Features ==
In walking cities, before the adoption of the automobile, facilities were "crammed into the smallest space possible". Streets were by necessity narrow, overhanging upper stories were common, and they were often surrounded by walls for defensive purposes. Urban planning and policies related to zoning and infrastructure allow modern cities to be more walkable. Past city planning affects current public transit systems, causing areas with large urban sprawl to have less-accessible public transit. An example of this is the United States, which spends more public tax dollars on transit than comparable European and Asian countries, but has lower ridership.

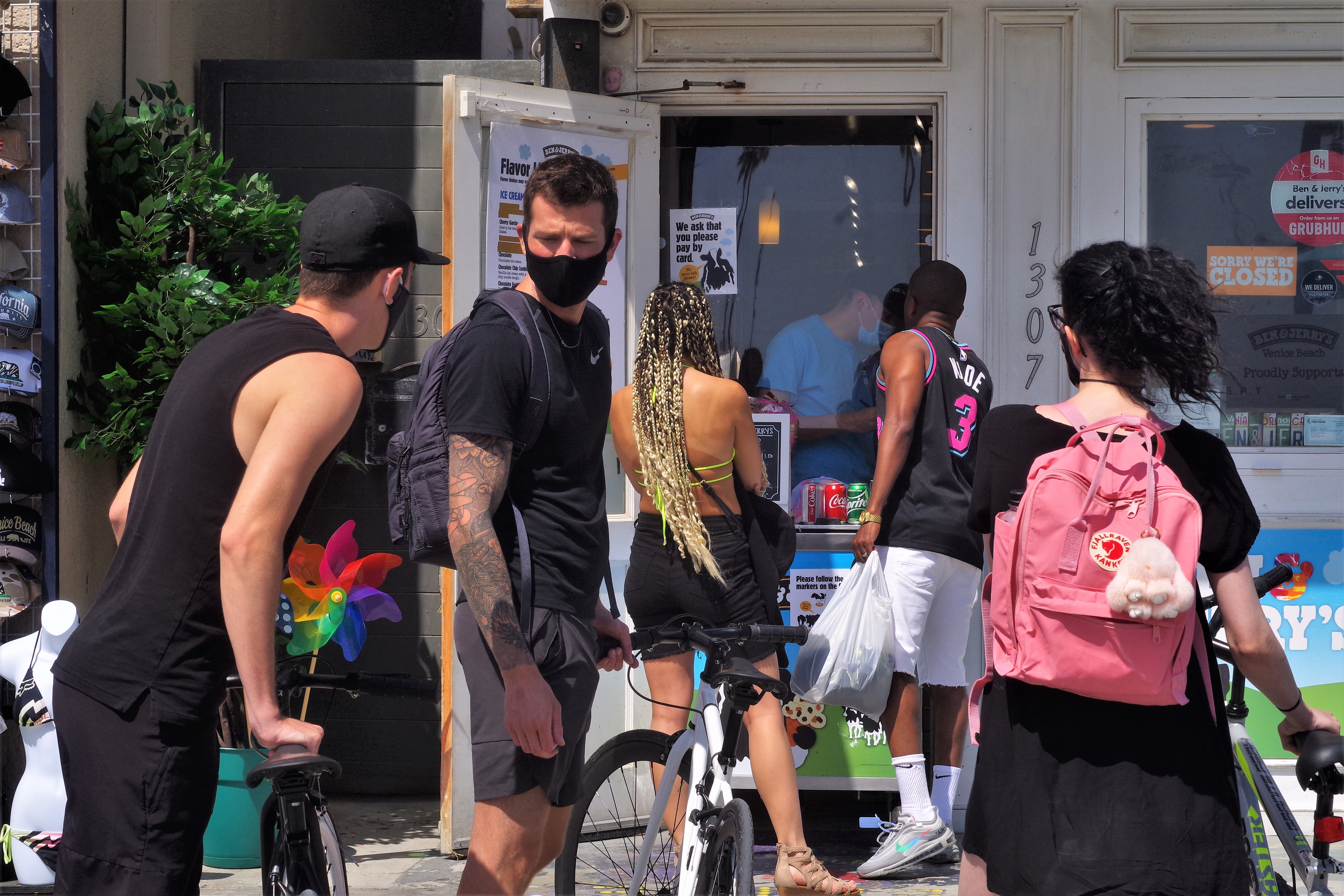
A group of masked pedestrians and cyclists stand in a line outside of a store.

Walking cities allow for greater economic, health, and social outcomes by allowing opportunities for connection in environments that prioritize human health over vehicular transit. Non-vehicular transit tends to be more reliable and affordable, and can increase ease for a consumer visit multiple shops. Walking cities also allowed for physical activity during the COVID-19 pandemic, providing safe ways to be outside. The pandemic saw an increase in walking for leisure compared to walking for utilitarian purposes, a trend that remained consistent following the pandemic.

Cities that rank higher in walkability also tend to have residents who believe their city has more social capital.

== Examples ==
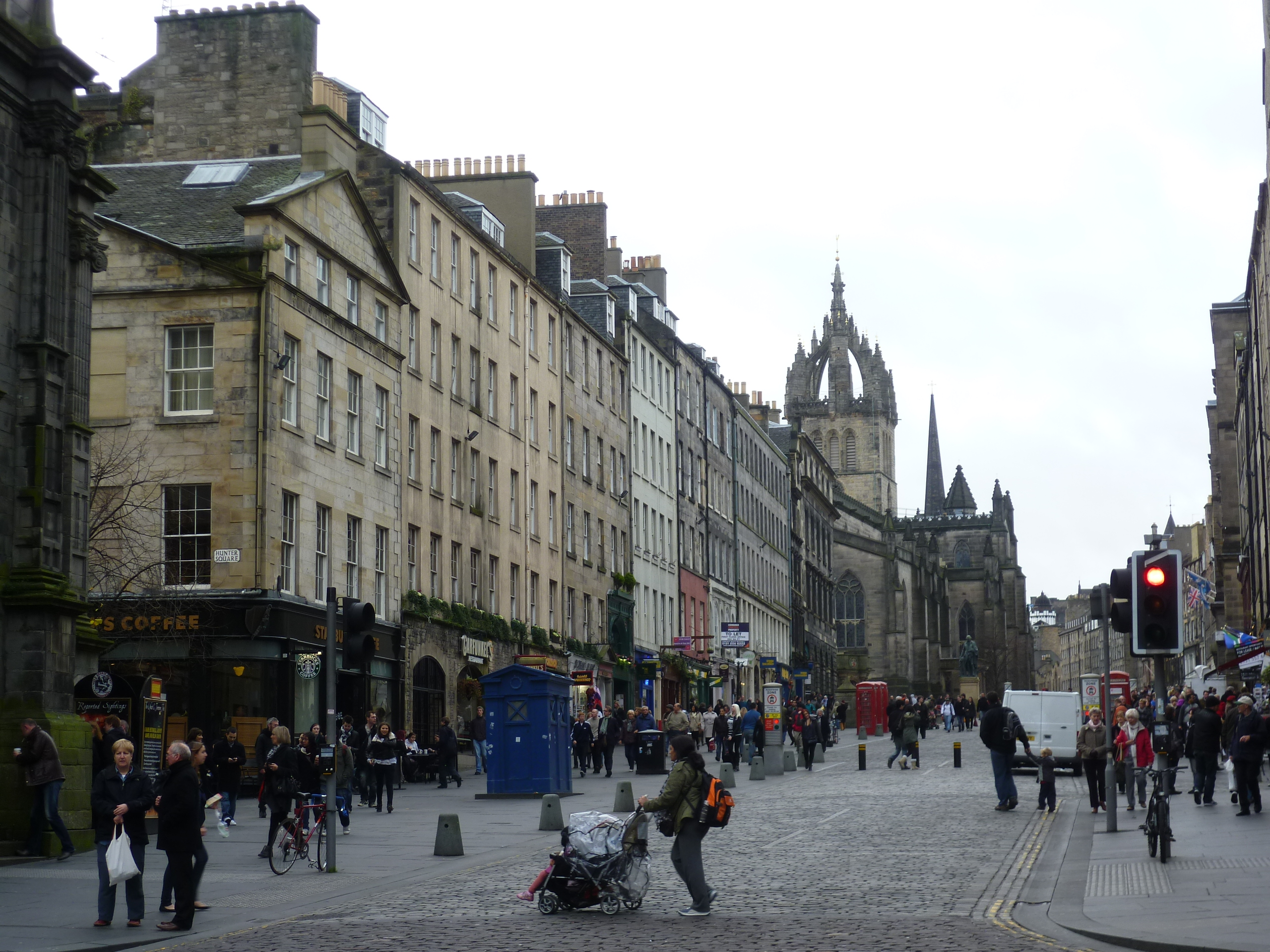
Edinburgh High Street, Scotland

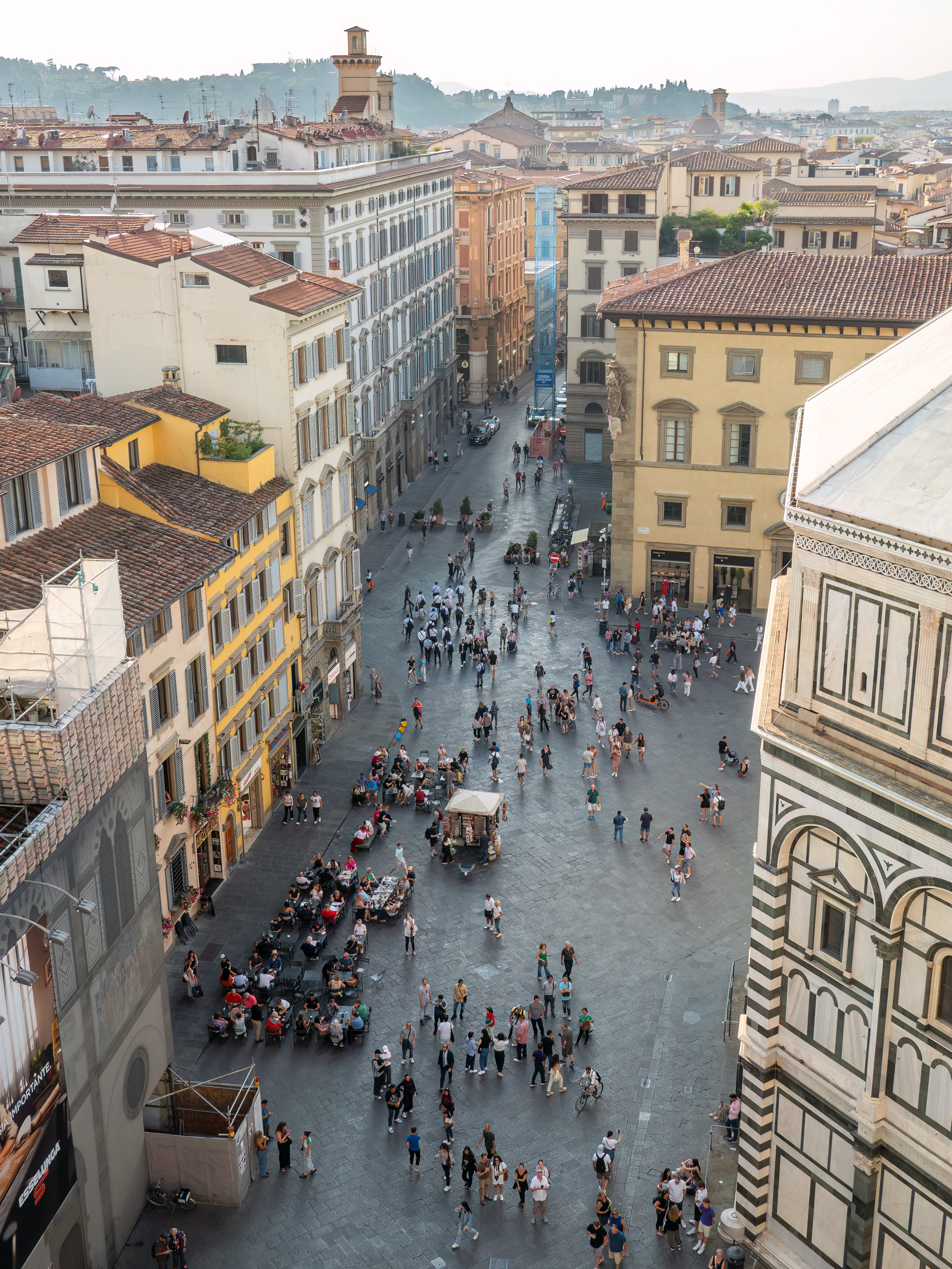
Piazza San Giovanni, Florence, Italy

The ten most-walkable cities, according to the tourism website Tourlane, are Florence, Venice, Riga, Athens, Hamburg, Edinburgh, Madrid, Porto, Tallinn, and Stockholm.

The walkability of an area is determined by factors such as density, functional mix, and access networks. The Institute for Transportation and Development Policy (ITDP) ranked the walkability of cities according to the closeness to car-free places (100 m (330 ft)), closeness to healthcare and education (1 km (0.62 mi)), and by the small size of city blocks. Public policy components, including the allocation of funds toward public transit and walkways, and zoning and infrastructure changes, contribute to the success of walkable cities.

Madrid combines inner-city transit with light-rail trains to provide over 89% of the population access to the transit system from less than 1 km (0.62 mi) away.

== Environmental impact ==
Walkable cities encourage walking, cycling, and public transit rather than passenger vehicles, which decreases the use of fossil fuels. In the United States, transportation is the largest single contributor to greenhouse gas emissions, accounting for 27% of the total in 2020. Increased walkability results in less air and noise pollution, and additional land for green space that is not being used by vehicles. These and other factors tackle environmental injustice by ameliorating climate change and improving accessibility. The United Nations outlines 17 Sustainable Development Goals that aim to tackle social and environmental problems, and walking cities address the UNSD objective "SDG #11: Sustainable Cities and Communities" through urban planning that allows access to better transportation.

Green spaces and parks within walking cities can encourage physical activity among residents of all ages. They can reduce air, water, and noise pollution by creating sustainable outdoor spaces.

== See also ==
- 15-minute city, an urban accessibility concept in which most daily necessities and services, such as work, shopping, education, healthcare, and leisure can be easily reached by a 15-minute walk, bike ride, or public transit ride from any point in the city
- Automotive city – Urban planning prioritising automobiles
- Car-free city – Urban area absent of motor vehicles
- Most livable cities
- Pedestrian village – Urban planning for mixed-use areas prioritising pedestrians
- Permeability (spatial and transport planning) – Freedom of movement of traffic
- Street reclamation – Changing streets to focus on non-car use
- Transit-oriented development – Urban planning prioritising transit
- Urban vitality – Intensity of use of an urban area
