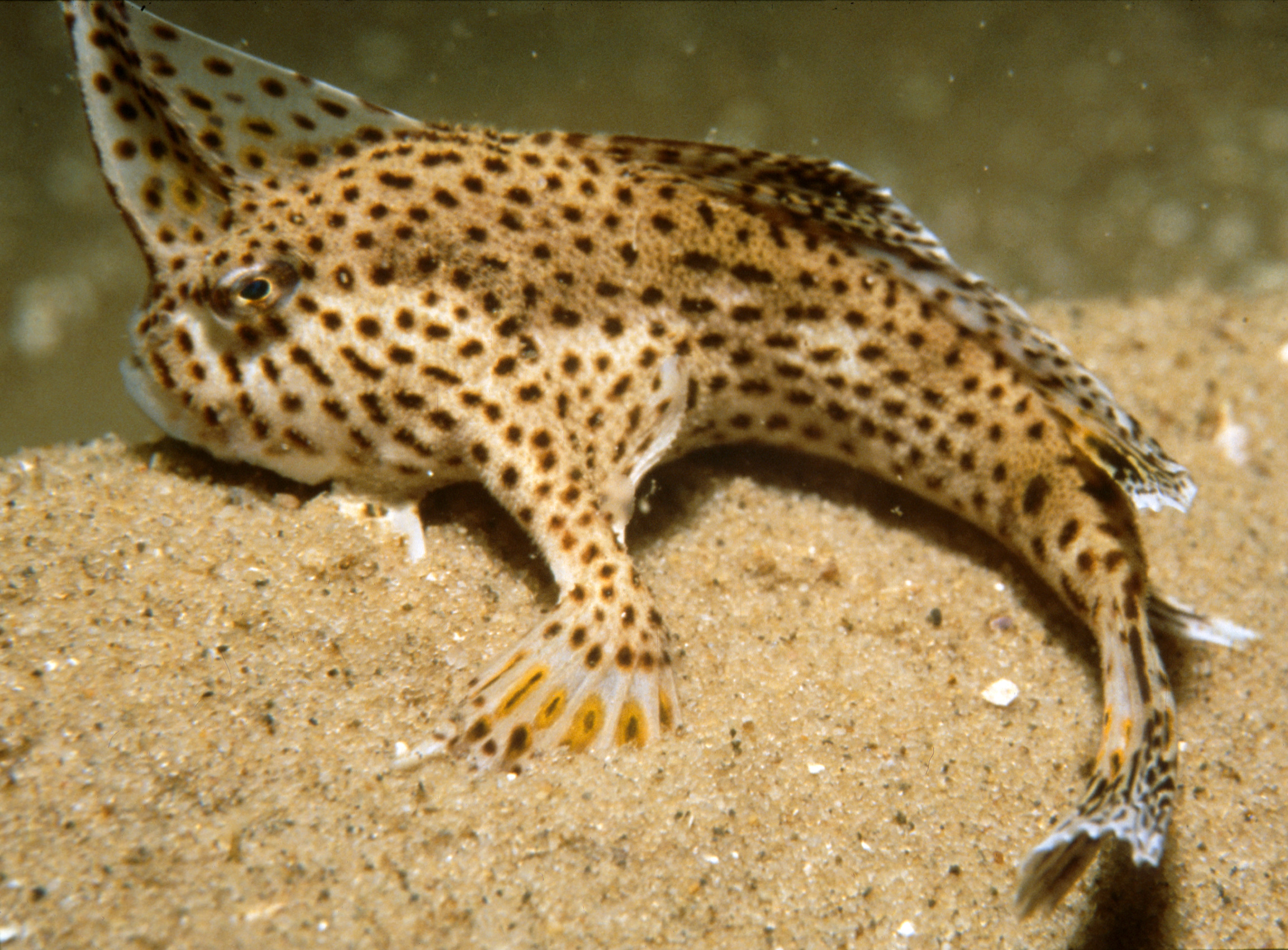
- Brachionichthys hirsutus

Scientific classification
- Kingdom: Animalia
- Phylum: Chordata
- Class: Actinopterygii
- Division: Teleostei
- Order: Lophiiformes
- Family: Antennariidae
- Subfamily: Brachionichthyinae; T. N. Gill, 1878

Genera
- see text

= Handfish =

Handfish Temporal range: 50–0 Ma Ypresian to Present

Family of fishes

Handfish or warty frogfish are marine, ray-finned fishes belonging to the subfamily Brachionichthyinae, a group that comprises five genera and 14 extant species and is classified within the frogfish family Antennariidae in the order Lophiiformes, the anglerfishes. These benthic, marine fish are unusual in the way that in addition to swimming, they also use their pectoral fins to "walk" on the sea floor.

== Taxonomy ==
The handfishes were first proposed as a family, the Brachionichthyidae, in 1878 by American ichthyologist Theodore Gill. The Brachionichthyidae were classified within the suborder Antennarioidei within the order Lophiiformes, the anglerfishes. In 2025, in response to the Antennariidae sensu lato being found to be paraphyletic and increasingly oversplit into distinct families, it was subsumed into a subfamily of the Antenariidae, which is now recognized by Eschmeyer's Catalog of Fishes. Previously, the Brachionichthyidae was regarded as the most basal family within the suborder Antennarioidei. However, the 2025 phylogenetic study found them to be relatively derived, and the sister group to the Rhycherinae.

== Genera ==
The following taxonomy is based on Eschmeyer's Catalog of Fishes (2025):

- Brachionichthys Bleeker, 1854
- Brachiopsilus Last & Gledhill, 2009
- Pezichthys Last & Gledhill, 2009
- Sympterichthys Gill, 1878
- Thymichthys Last & Gledhill, 2009

The following two fossil genera are also known, both from the Early Eocene-aged Monte Bolca site of Italy:

- †Histionotophorus Eastman, 1904
- †Orrichthys Carnevale & Pietsch, 2010

== Distribution ==
Handfish are found today in the coastal waters of southern and eastern Australia and around the island state of Tasmania. This is the most species-rich of the few marine fish families endemic to the Australian region, with all but three species found there. Fourteen species of handfish are found around Tasmania.

The biology of handfishes is poorly known and their typically small population sizes and restricted distributions make them highly vulnerable to disturbance. Some species are considered to be critically endangered.

== Anatomy ==
Handfish grow up to 15 cm (5.9 in) long, and have skin covered with denticles (tooth-like scales), giving them the alternative name "warty anglers". They are slow-moving fish that prefer to "walk" rather than swim, using their modified pectoral fins to move about on the sea floor. These highly modified fins have the appearance of hands, hence their scientific name, from Latin bracchium meaning "arm" and Greek ichthys meaning "fish".

Like other anglerfish, they possess an illicium, a modified dorsal fin ray above the mouth, but it is short and does not appear to be used as a fishing lure. The second dorsal spine is joined to the third by a flap of skin, making a crest.

== Fossil record ==
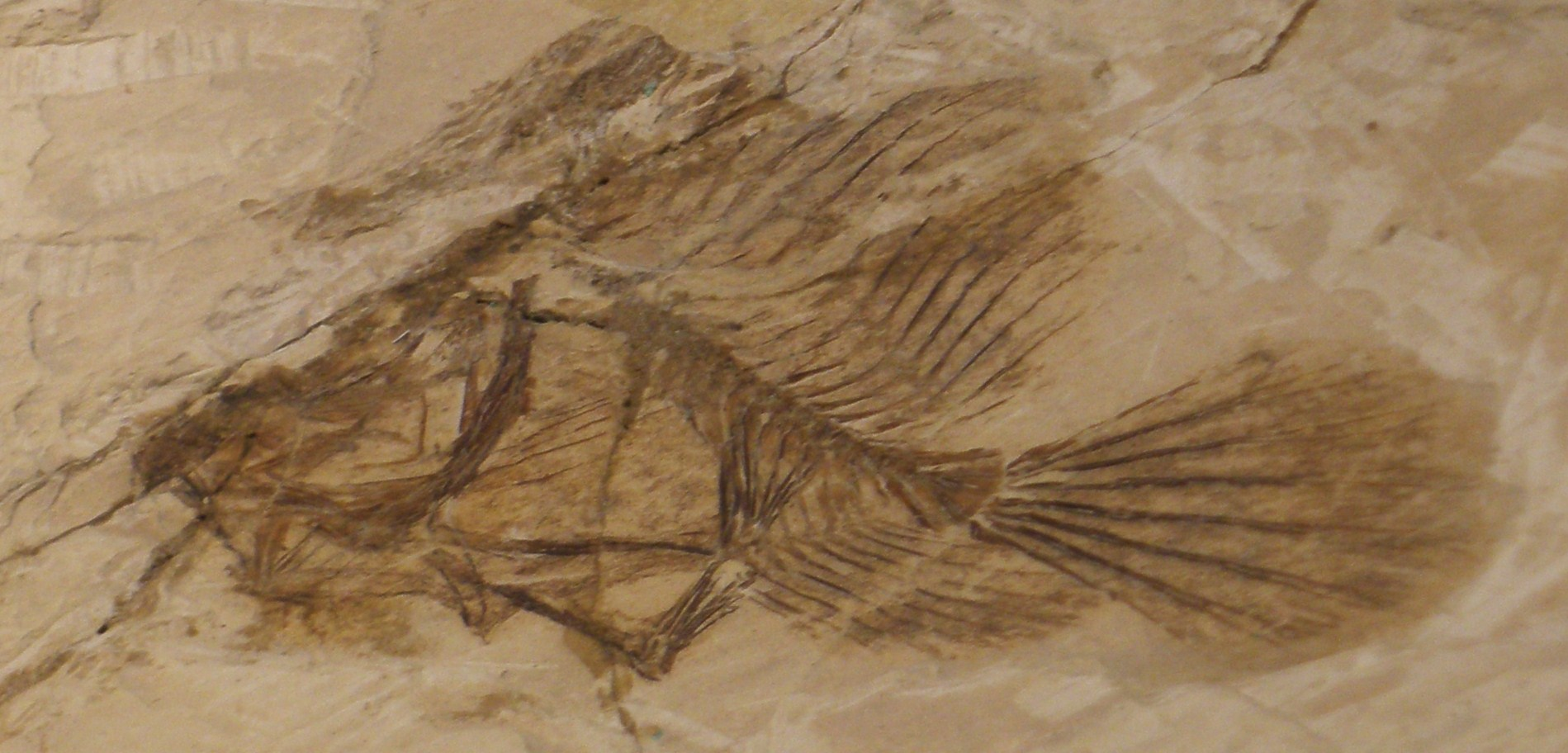
Fossil of Histionotophorus bassani

The prehistoric species Histionotophorus bassani and Orrichthys longimanus, both from the Early Eocene of Monte Bolca, are now considered to be handfish. Considering the low extant diversity, restricted geographical distribution, and very meagre fossil record of antennarioids in general, the existence of fossil representatives of the family Brachionichthyidae is unusual. Also unusual is their early presence in Italy, given their modern restriction to waters around southern Australia.

== Conservation status ==
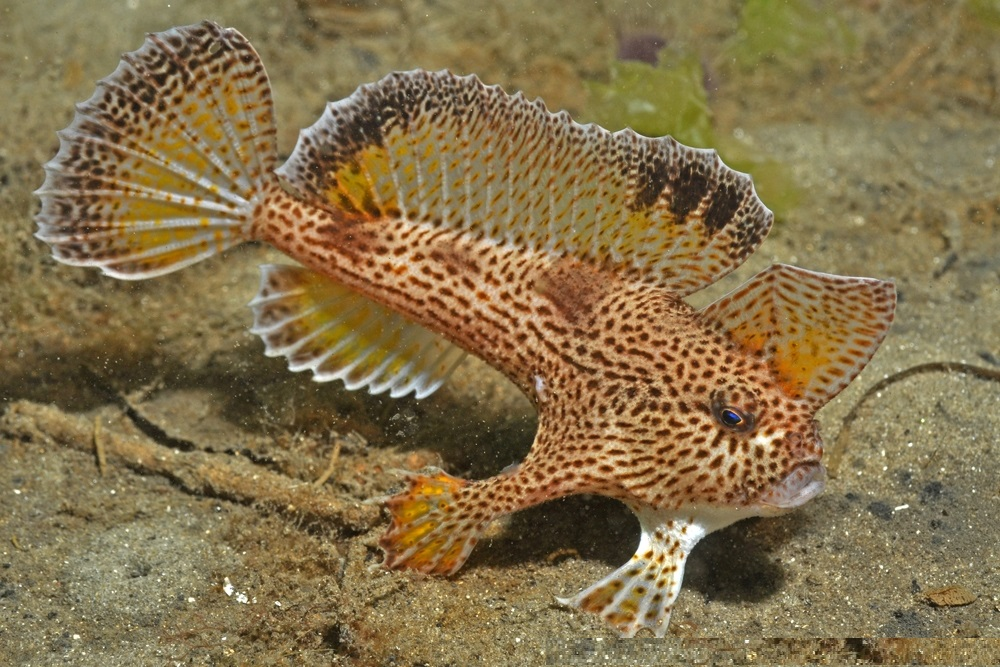
Spotted handfish, Brachionichthys hirsutus

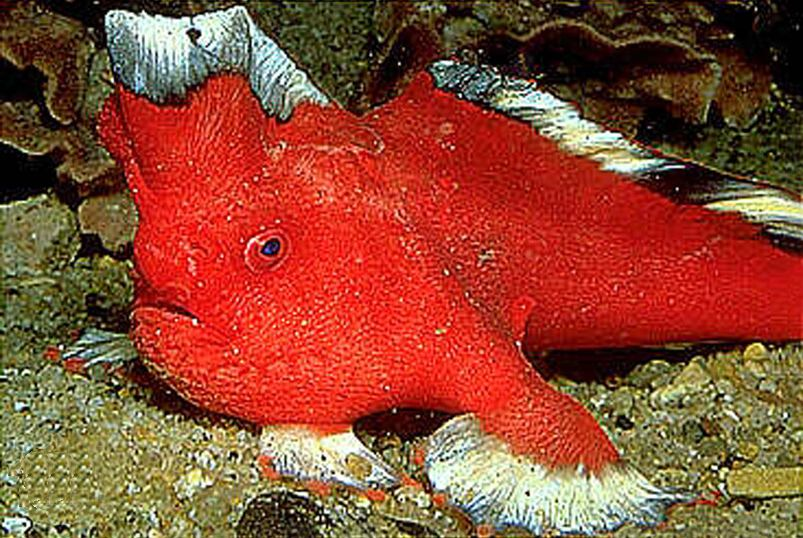
Red handfish, Thymichthys politus

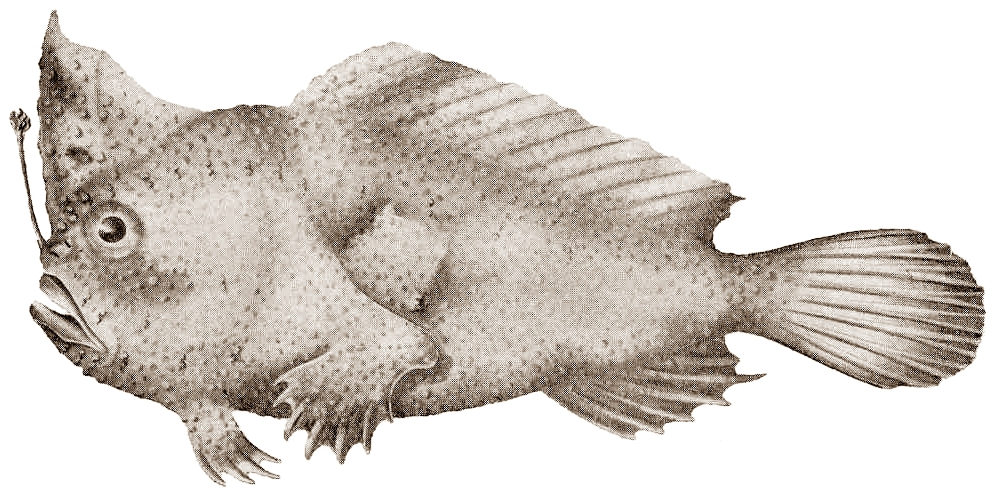
Warty handfish, Thymichthys verrucosus

In 1996, the spotted handfish (Brachionichthys hirsutus) was the first marine fish to be listed as critically endangered in the IUCN Red List. With its only habitat in the Derwent River estuary and surrounds, it is threatened by the Northern Pacific seastar's invasion into southern Australian waters. The Northern Pacific seastar (Asterias amurensis), preys on not only the fish eggs, but also on the sea squirts (ascidians) that help to form the substrate that the fish spawn on.

The cause of the decline in spotted handfish is unclear. Suggested causes may include disturbance of benthic communities and predation on egg masses by the introduced northern Pacific seastar, habitat modification through increased siltation, heavy metal contamination, or urban effluent. The lack of a pelagic larval stage and low rates of dispersal may be responsible for their restricted distributions, and may also have an impact on their ability to recolonise areas where they once occurred.

In March 2020, the smooth handfish (Sympterichthys unipennis) was declared extinct in the IUCN Red List. Once common enough to be one of the first fish to be described by European explorers of Australia, but not seen for well over a century, this is the first modern-day marine fish to be officially declared extinct. However, this status was reversed in September 2021 and classified as Data Deficient, as survey data were insufficient to confirm that status.

In October 2021, the endangered and very rare pink handfish (Brachiopsilus dianthus) was seen for the first time since 1999, in footage from a camera placed on the sea bed off Tasmania at a depth of 150 m (490 ft). Prior to this sighting, this species was assumed to be confined to shallow waters. The discovery that it has a greater range than previously thought may give cause for optimism regarding its survival.

=== Current status of species ===
As of December 2021 three species of handfish are listed as threatened under the Environment Protection and Biodiversity Conservation Act 1999 (EPBC Act) and the IUCN:

- Brachionichthys hirsutus, spotted handfish – critically endangered under EPBC Act and IUCN;
- Thymichthys politus, (Note: Fishes of Australia says Brachionichthys politus, red handfish, and it appears from the Australian Govt Species Profile and Threats Database that change of name occurred from this name to the current one around 2011, with the EPBC Act updated accordingly.) red handfish – Critically Endangered under EPBC Act and IUCN; and
- Brachiopsilus ziebelli, Ziebell's handfish – vulnerable under EPBC Act, critically endangered under IUCN.

All three of the above are listed as endangered under the Tasmanian Threatened Species Protection Act 1995, and all handfish species are protected under the Tasmanian Living Marine Resources Management Act 1995, which prohibits their collection in state waters without a permit.
