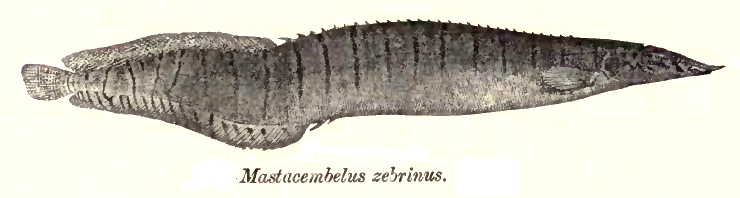
- 1889 photo

Conservation status
- Least Concern (IUCN 3.1)

Scientific classification
- Kingdom: Animalia
- Phylum: Chordata
- Class: Actinopterygii
- Order: Synbranchiformes
- Family: Mastacembelidae
- Genus: Macrognathus
- Species: M. zebrinus

Binomial name
- Macrognathus zebrinus (Blyth, 1858)

Synonyms
- Mastacembelus zebrinus Blyth, 1858

= Macrognathus zebrinus =

Species of fish

Macrognathus zebrinus, the zebra spiny eel, is a species of spiny eel endemic to Myanmar, specifically known from the Irrawaddy River, Sittaung River and Salween River and may also occur in Indonesia. It was originally described as Mastacembelus zebrinus before being moved to the genus Macrognathus in 1984 and 1986.

It is pale brown with deeper color in the back and dusky stripes throughout the body (this is more distinct with the young) and has scales on its snout. In 1888, pioneer ichthyologist Francis Day once noted that he thought Macrognathus pancalus (although smaller) and M. zebrinus were one species; he also described it as yellow with vertical blue stripes with striped and spotted fins.

It has also been introduced to Singapore and is now an established species, known from four reservoirs Kranji, Lower Peirce, Lower Seletar and Tengeh. It is active at twilight and night and is predatory, feeding on mosquito larvae, earthworms, Tubifex, small crustaceans and other fishes. It is fished as part of mixed catch and is also collected as an ornamental fish. Although it is not well known, it is listed as Least Concern and protection and research is needed.
