= Macrognathus pentophthalmos =

Conservation status
- Critically endangered, possibly extinct (IUCN 3.1)

Scientific classification
- Kingdom: Animalia
- Phylum: Chordata
- Class: Actinopterygii
- Order: Synbranchiformes
- Family: Mastacembelidae
- Genus: Macrognathus
- Species: M. pentophthalmos

Binomial name
- Macrognathus pentophthalmos (Gronow, 1854)

Synonyms
- Mastacembelus pentophthalmos Gronow, 1854

Species of fish

Macrognathus pentophthalmos, the Sri Lanka five-eyed spiny eel, is a small species of spiny eel that is endemic to freshwater habitats in Sri Lanka. Described as a common species as recently as 1980, for unknown reasons its population rapidly declined in the following years and there are no recent confirmed records. In 2012, it was listed as "Critically Endangered, possibly Extinct" in the Sri Lankan National Red List, which was matched by IUCN in 2019.

It is up to 19.5 cm (7.7 in) in standard length. Compared to Mastacembelus armatus, the only other spiny eel in Sri Lanka, M. pentophthalmos has a striped/plain (not mottled) pattern, and clearly separated dorsal, caudal and anal fins. The English name of M. pentophthalmos refers to the series of dark spots on its dorsal fin.

Described as a new species in 1854, it was then considered a synonym of the widespread M. aral. In 2008 it was shown that this was mistaken and M. pentophthalmos was reinstated as a valid species (the true M. aral is not found in Sri Lanka).
