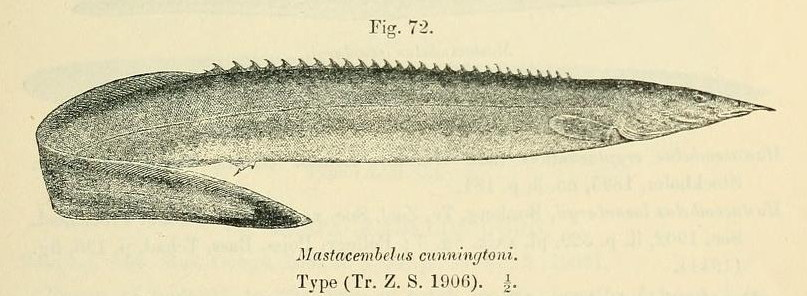

Conservation status
- Least Concern (IUCN 3.1)

Scientific classification
- Kingdom: Animalia
- Phylum: Chordata
- Class: Actinopterygii
- Order: Synbranchiformes
- Family: Mastacembelidae
- Genus: Mastacembelus
- Species: M. cunningtoni

Binomial name
- Mastacembelus cunningtoni Boulenger, 1906

Synonyms
- Aethiomastacembelus cunningtoni (Boulenger, 1906); Afromastacembelus cunningtoni (Boulenger, 1906)

= Mastacembelus cunningtoni =

Species of fish

Mastacembelus cunningtoni is a species of fish in the family Mastacembelidae. It is endemic to the Lake Tanganyika basin, including the Lakes outflow, the Lukuga River as far as the Kisimba-Kilia rapids. It occurs in Burundi, the Democratic Republic of the Congo, Tanzania, and Zambia. The specific name of this fish honours the British zoologist and anthropologist William Alfred Cunnington (1877-1958), leader of the expedition to Lake Tanganyika which collected the type.
