= Mastacembelus micropectus =

Conservation status
- Least Concern (IUCN 3.1)

Scientific classification
- Kingdom: Animalia
- Phylum: Chordata
- Class: Actinopterygii
- Order: Synbranchiformes
- Family: Mastacembelidae
- Genus: Mastacembelus
- Species: M. micropectus

Binomial name
- Mastacembelus micropectus Matthes, 1962

Synonyms
- Afromastacembelus micropectus (Matthes, 1962); Caecomastacembelus micropectus (Matthes, 1962)

Species of fish

Mastacembelus micropectus is a species of fish in the family Mastacembelidae. It is endemic to Lake Tanganyika. It is threatened by habitat loss.
