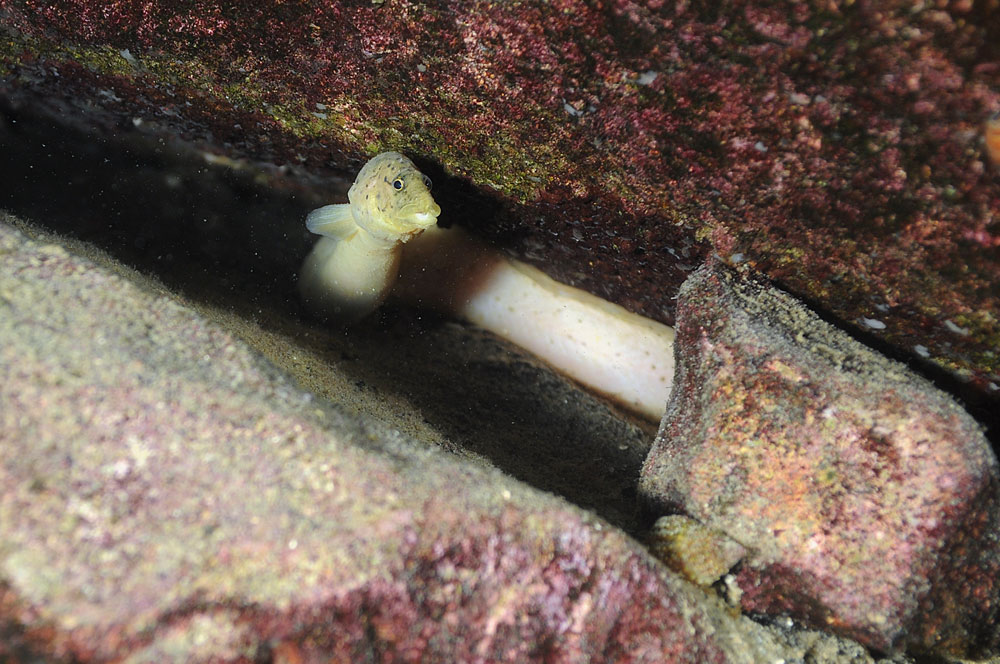

Conservation status
- Least Concern (IUCN 3.1)

Scientific classification
- Kingdom: Animalia
- Phylum: Chordata
- Class: Actinopterygii
- Order: Synbranchiformes
- Family: Mastacembelidae
- Genus: Mastacembelus
- Species: M. flavidus

Binomial name
- Mastacembelus flavidus Matthes, 1962

Synonyms
- Aethiomastacembelus flavidus (Matthes, 1962); Afromastacembelus flavidus (Matthes, 1962)

= Mastacembelus flavidus =

Species of fish

Mastacembelus flavidus is a species of fish in the family Mastacembelidae. It is endemic to Lake Tanganyika in Burundi, the Democratic Republic of the Congo, Tanzania, and Zambia. It is found among rocks in shallow, coastal waters to a depth of 6 m (20 ft).
