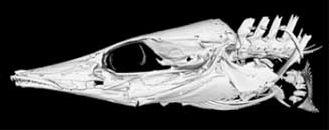
- CT scan of head of Mastacembelus platysoma

Conservation status
- Least Concern (IUCN 3.1)

Scientific classification
- Kingdom: Animalia
- Phylum: Chordata
- Class: Actinopterygii
- Order: Synbranchiformes
- Family: Mastacembelidae
- Genus: Mastacembelus
- Species: M. platysoma

Binomial name
- Mastacembelus platysoma Poll & Matthes, 1962

Synonyms
- Aethiomastacembelus platysoma (Poll & Matthes, 1962); Afromastacembelus platysoma (Poll & Matthes, 1962)

= Mastacembelus platysoma =

Species of fish

Mastacembelus platysoma is a species of fish, a spiny eel in the family Mastacembelidae. It is found in Lake Tanganyika which is bordered by Burundi, the Democratic Republic of the Congo, Tanzania and Zambia. The IUCN has listed it as being of "Least Concern".

== Description ==
Like other members of its genus, Mastacembelus platysoma is an elongated, eel-like fish and has a long snout with a pair of tubulated nostrils. It has a series of widely spaced dorsal spines on its back and it has 71 vertebrae. It grows to a maximum length of about 16 cm (6 in).

== Distribution and habitat ==
Mastacembelus platysoma is endemic to Lake Tanganyika and occurs nowhere else. It is found in rocky coastal areas of the lake at depths of down to about 30 m (98 ft).

== Ecology ==
Mastacembelus platysoma is one of fourteen species of spiny eel which live in Lake Tanganyika. These fish have radiated from a common ancestor, each one developing specialist adaptations fitting it for a different ecological niche in the lake. In this way, competition between the species is avoided as each has a different diet and occupies a slightly different microhabitat.

== Status ==
The IUCN has listed Mastacembelus platysoma as being of "Least Concern" as it has a wide distribution in the lake and no major threats have been identified.
