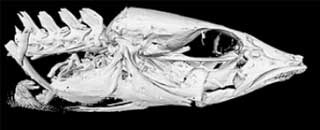
- Mastacembelus albomaculatus

Conservation status
- Least Concern (IUCN 3.1)

Scientific classification
- Kingdom: Animalia
- Phylum: Chordata
- Class: Actinopterygii
- Order: Synbranchiformes
- Family: Mastacembelidae
- Genus: Mastacembelus
- Species: M. albomaculatus

Binomial name
- Mastacembelus albomaculatus Poll, 1953

= Mastacembelus albomaculatus =

Species of fish

Mastacembelus albomaculatus is a species of fish in the family Mastacembelidae. It is endemic to Lake Tanganyika and is found in Burundi, the Democratic Republic of the Congo, Tanzania, and Zambia. It is found in rocky zones in the coastal areas of the lake.
