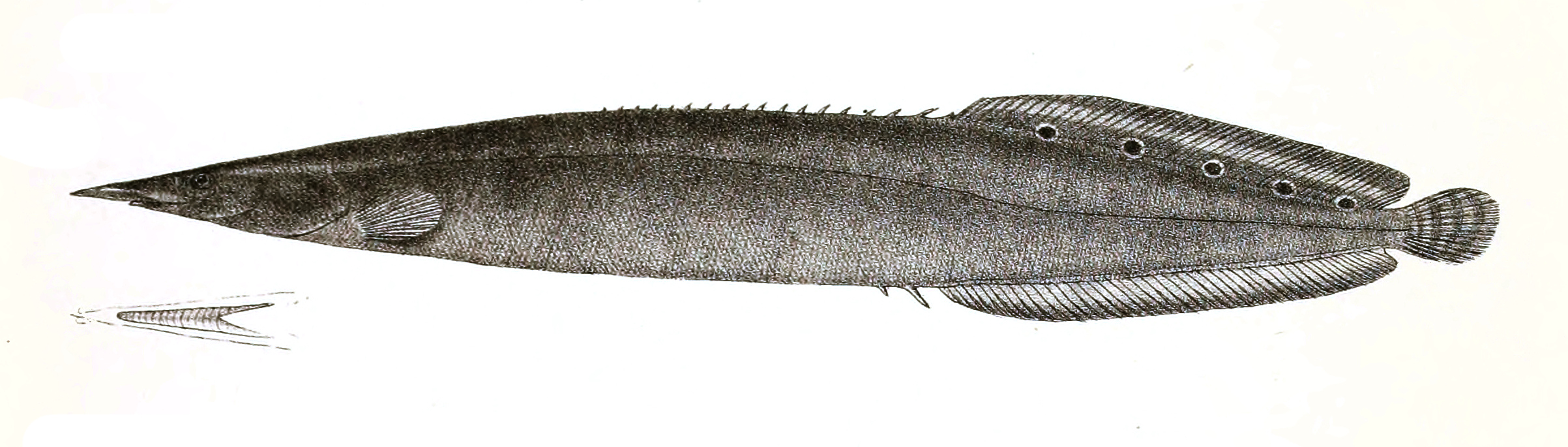

Scientific classification
- Kingdom: Animalia
- Phylum: Chordata
- Class: Actinopterygii
- Order: Synbranchiformes
- Family: Mastacembelidae
- Genus: Macrognathus
- Species: M. aculeatus

Binomial name
- Macrognathus aculeatus (Bloch, 1786)

Synonyms
- Ophidium aculeatum Bloch, 1786; Mastacembelus aculeatus (Bloch, 1786); Rhyncobdella aculeata (Bloch, 1786)

= Lesser spiny eel =

Species of fish

The lesser spiny eel, Macrognathus aculeatus, is a Southeast Asian tropical freshwater fish belonging to the family Mastacembelidae. They are uncommonly found in aquaria.

== Physical characteristics ==
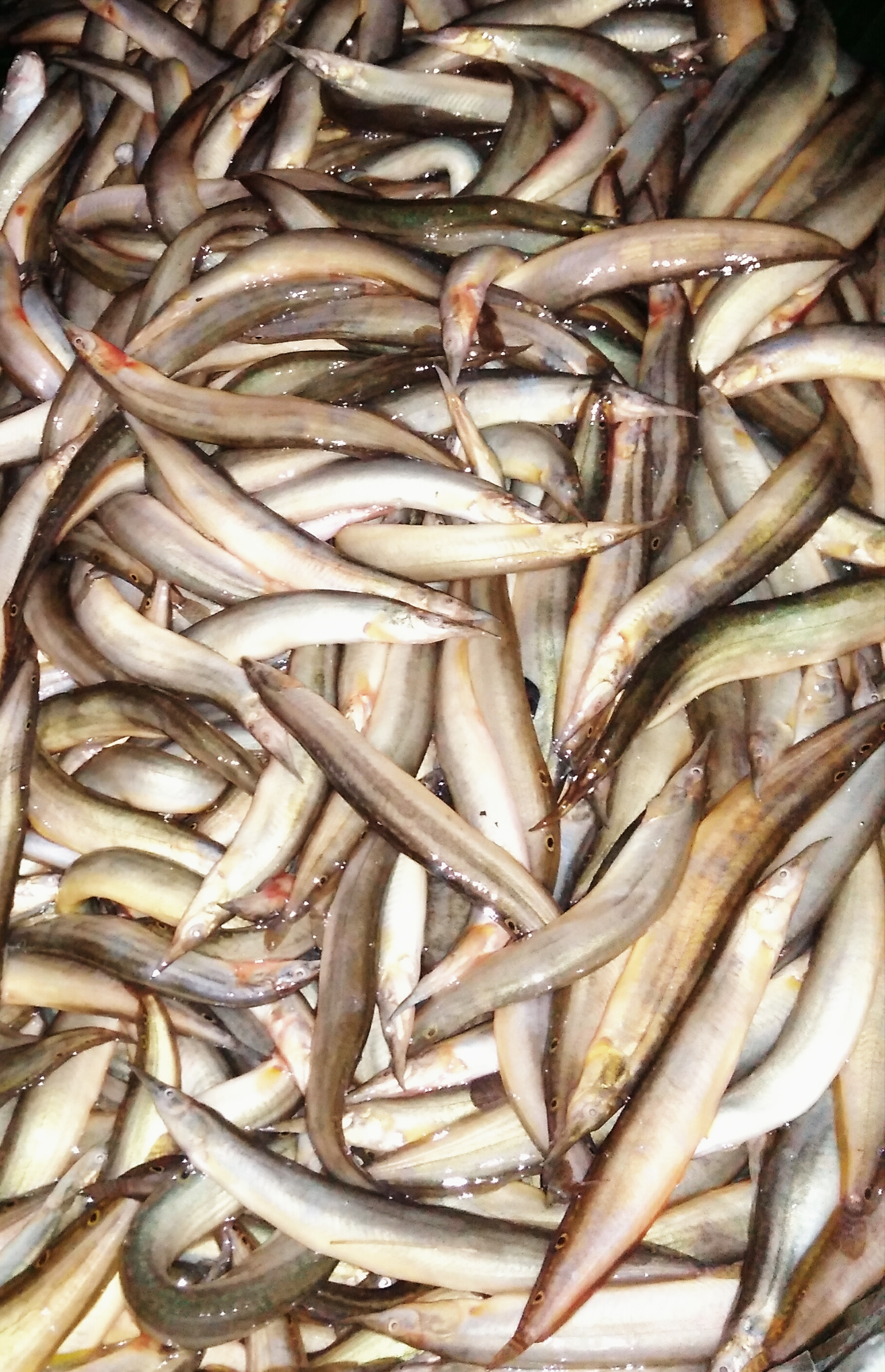
eel from Bangladesh.

The eel has an upper-body that is yellow, a black line down the middle and the lower-body is usually a mix of white and brown. Along the backbone of the eel, the dorsal fin is preceded by numerous isolated small spines that can be raised, giving them the name. The dorsal fin also has many prominent eyespots along the base. There are many different variations of the Spiny Eel. They can grow up to be 14 inches long (35 centimeters), but are usually smaller.

== Distribution and habitat ==
This fish is found in Southeast Asia from locations such as Malaysia, Thailand, Borneo, and Indonesia. They occur in medium to large-sized rivers. They are found in lowland wetlands and peats. These fish are an uncommon aquarium fish.

== Behavior ==
They're crepuscular and nocturnal burrowers. They may prey on small fish.
