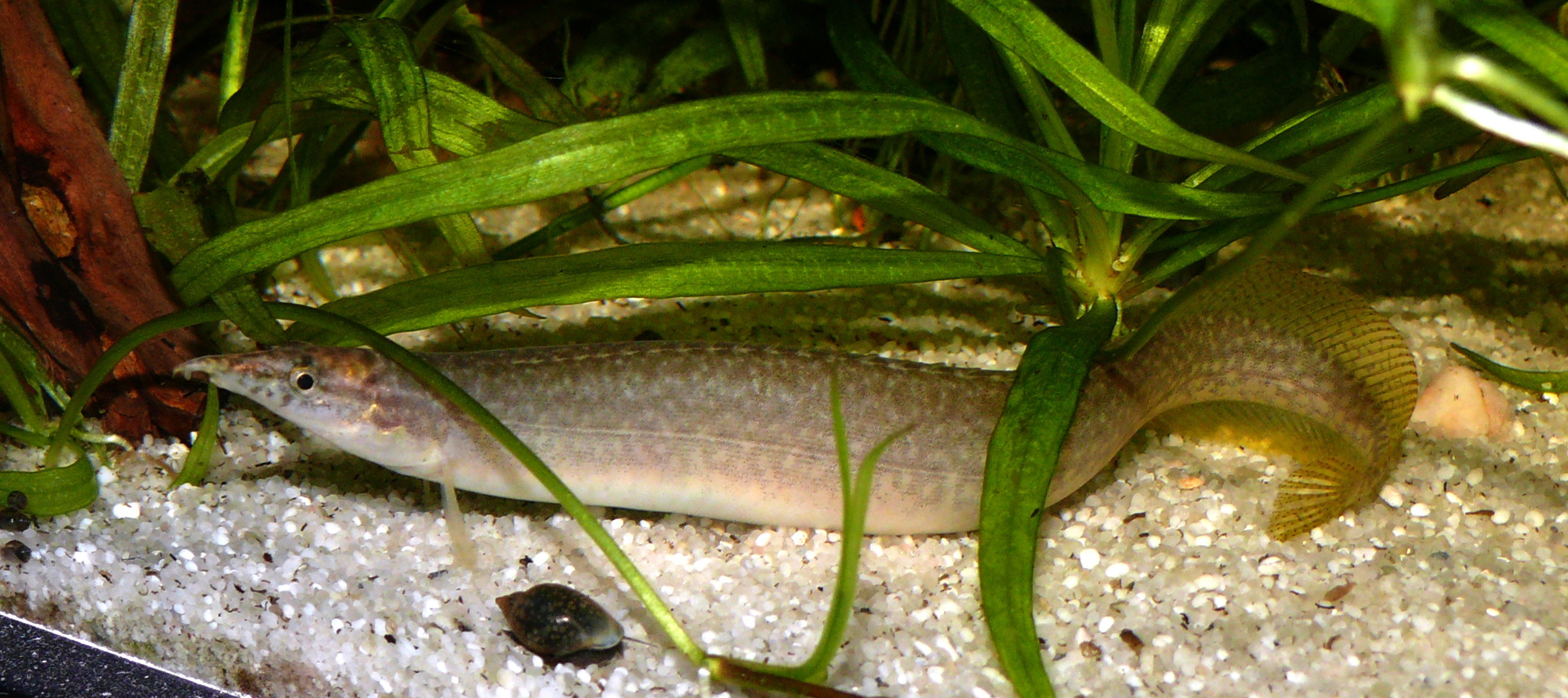

Scientific classification
- Kingdom: Animalia
- Phylum: Chordata
- Class: Actinopterygii
- Division: Teleostei
- Order: Synbranchiformes
- Family: Mastacembelidae
- Genus: Macrognathus
- Species: M. fasciatus

Binomial name
- Macrognathus fasciatus Plamoottil & Abraham, 2014

= Macrognathus fasciatus =

Species of fish

Macrognathus fasciatus is a species of spiny eel found in the Manimala River and first described in 2014. Macrognathus fasciatus differs from its relative species by the presence of 28–30 dorsal spines, 26–27 vertical lateral lines on the body, 8–9 whitish yellow round spots present in a row in between every two vertical lines and first dorsal spine originate at the level or a little behind the end of pectoral fin.
