= Mastacembelus alboguttatus =

Conservation status
- Least Concern (IUCN 3.1)

Scientific classification
- Kingdom: Animalia
- Phylum: Chordata
- Class: Actinopterygii
- Order: Synbranchiformes
- Family: Mastacembelidae
- Genus: Mastacembelus
- Species: M. alboguttatus

Binomial name
- Mastacembelus alboguttatus Boulenger, 1893

Species of fish

Boulenger's spiny eel (Mastacembelus alboguttatus) is a species of ray-finned fish endemic to India, Myanmar and Thailand, known from Sittaung River, Salween River and Manipur River and possibly Irrawaddy River. Inhabiting large rivers and tributaries, it is consumed by locals but is uncommon in the aquarium trade. It may be threatened by habitat loss for deforestation, dams and overfishing and is harmless to humans.
