= Zebra spinyeel =

Conservation status
- Least Concern (IUCN 3.1)

Scientific classification
- Kingdom: Animalia
- Phylum: Chordata
- Class: Actinopterygii
- Order: Synbranchiformes
- Family: Mastacembelidae
- Genus: Mastacembelus
- Species: M. zebratus

Binomial name
- Mastacembelus zebratus Matthes, 1962

Synonyms
- Afromastacembelus zebratus (Matthes, 1962); Caecomastacembelus zebratus (Matthes, 1962)

Species of fish

The zebra spinyeel (Mastacembelus zebratus) is a species of fish in the family Mastacembelidae. It is endemic to Lake Tanganyika where it is a secretive species which hides among rocks or in the sediments.
