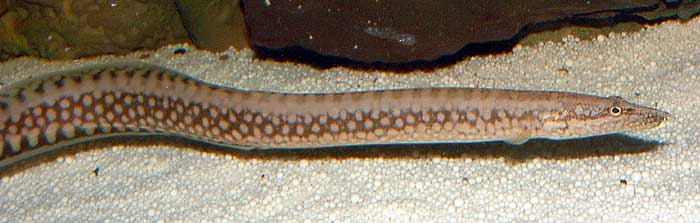
- Mastacembelus moorii
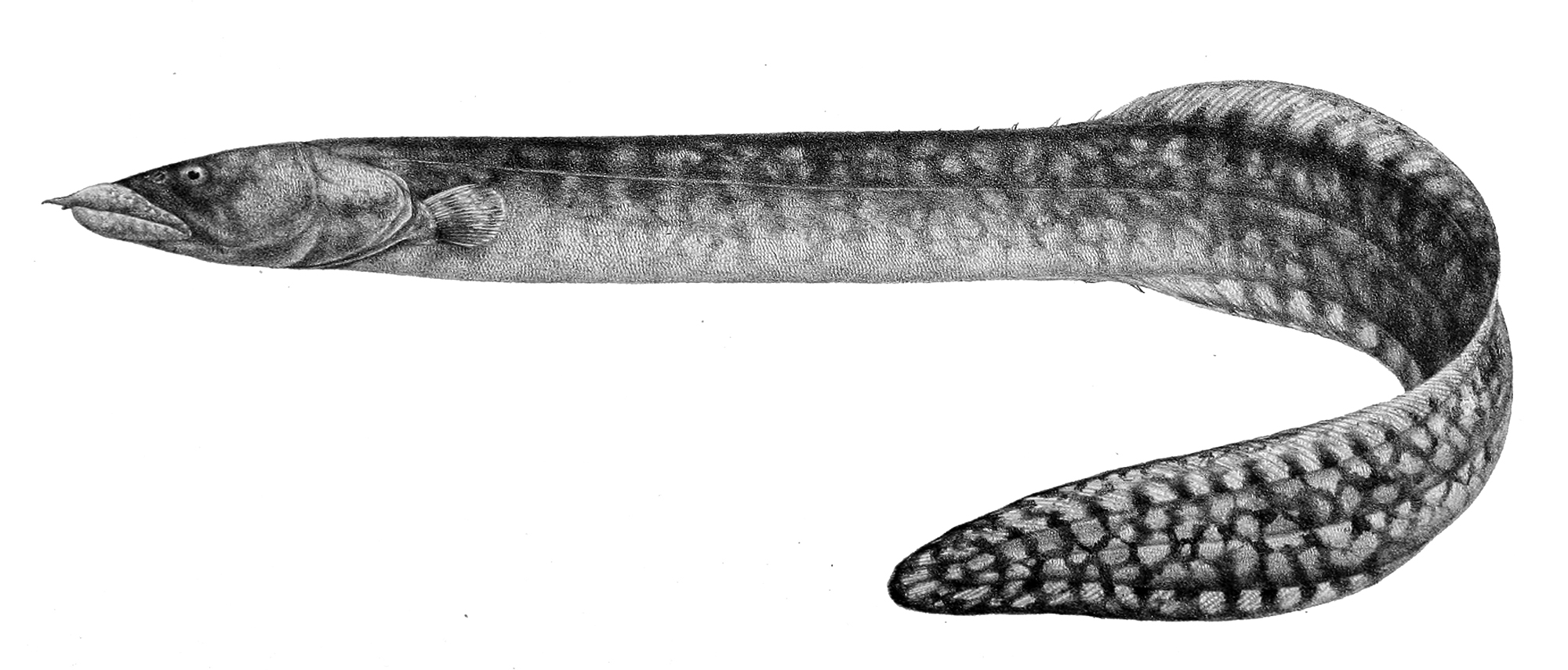

Conservation status
- Least Concern (IUCN 3.1)

Scientific classification
- Kingdom: Animalia
- Phylum: Chordata
- Class: Actinopterygii
- Order: Synbranchiformes
- Family: Mastacembelidae
- Genus: Mastacembelus
- Species: M. moorii

Binomial name
- Mastacembelus moorii Boulenger, 1898

Synonyms
- Aethiomastacembelus moori (Boulenger, 1898); Afromastacembelus moorii (Boulenger, 1898); Caecomastacembelus moorii (Boulenger, 1898); Mastacembelus moorii nigrofasciatus David & Poll, 1937; Mastacembelus christyi Worthington & Ricardo, 1937

= Mastacembelus moorii =

Species of fish

Mastacembelus moorii is a species of fish in the family Mastacembelidae. It is endemic to Lake Tanganyika where it is a secretive species hiding among rocks or in the sediment in the littoral zone. It grows to a total length of 44 centimetres (17 in). The specific name honours the leader of an expedition to Lake Tanganyika, the biologist John Edmund Sharrock Moore (1870-1947).
