= Macrognathus semiocellatus =

Conservation status
- Least Concern (IUCN 3.1)

Scientific classification
- Kingdom: Animalia
- Phylum: Chordata
- Class: Actinopterygii
- Order: Synbranchiformes
- Family: Mastacembelidae
- Genus: Macrognathus
- Species: M. semiocellatus

Binomial name
- Macrognathus semiocellatus (Fowler, 1935)

Synonyms
- Mastacembelus pentophthalmos Gronow, 1854

Species of fish

Macrognathus semiocellatus is a species of ray-finned fish endemic to Cambodia, Laos and Vietnam; it found in marshlands and vegetated water bodies in Mekong Chao Phraya River and Mae Klong. It spends its time during the day buried in silt, sand or fine gravel and forages at night for benthic insect larvae, crustaceans and worms.

It is listed as Least Concern as it is locally and seasonally common and its threats are not significant and there is no need for conservation protection; the threats are pollution and wetland removal. It is seen aquariums and is also fished and exported from Cambodia to Thailand and other countries.
