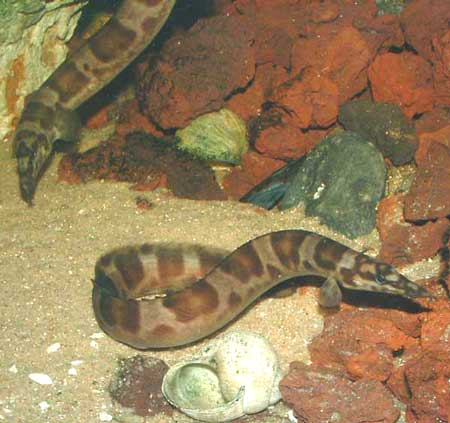

Conservation status
- Least Concern (IUCN 3.1)

Scientific classification
- Kingdom: Animalia
- Phylum: Chordata
- Class: Actinopterygii
- Order: Synbranchiformes
- Family: Mastacembelidae
- Genus: Mastacembelus
- Species: M. ellipsifer

Binomial name
- Mastacembelus ellipsifer Boulenger, 1899

Synonyms
- Aethiomastacembelus ellipsifer (Boulenger, 1899); Afromastacembelus ellipsifer (Boulenger, 1899)

= Mastacembelus ellipsifer =

Species of fish

Mastacembelus ellipsifer is a species of spiny eel that is endemic to Lake Tanganyika in Africa and sometimes kept in aquariums. Although sometimes called the Tanganyikan spiny eel, it is only one of fifteen spiny eel species in the Tanganyikan basin (fourteen endemic).

== Description ==
M. ellipsifer can up to 45 centimeters (18 in) long. It is brown, with a darker ring-shaped pattern running down its back. Its dorsal fins are hard. The eel is endemic to Lake Tanganyika and can commonly be found along shores. It is also found in intermediate zones. M. ellipsifer prefers coastal waters with a sandy, rock, or a muddy bottom. The species environment is benthopelagic freshwater. M. ellipsifer eats small fish in the wild, and is a nocturnal species. It is listed as Least Concern on the IUCN Red List. It was one of the species that was photographed as part of a FishBase mission that had the primary objective to document and photograph the rich fish diversity of Lake Tanganyika with the help of ichthyologist Dr. Tyson R. Roberts.
