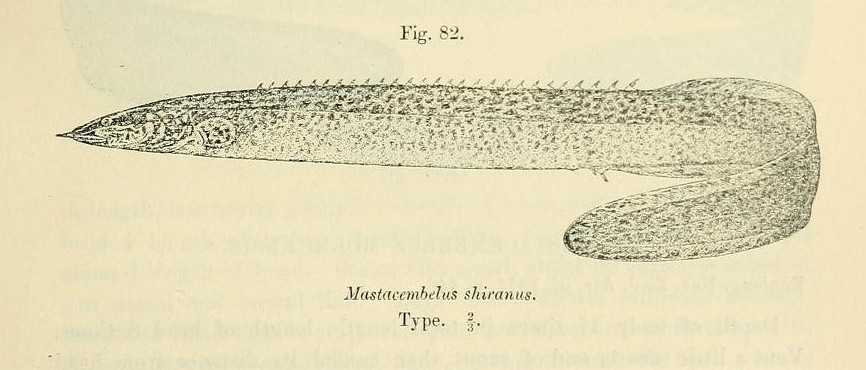
- The "Rosette" type, possibly a variant of A. shiranus or an undescribed species

Conservation status
- Least Concern (IUCN 3.1)

Scientific classification
- Kingdom: Animalia
- Phylum: Chordata
- Class: Actinopterygii
- Order: Synbranchiformes
- Family: Mastacembelidae
- Genus: Mastacembelus
- Species: M. shiranus

Binomial name
- Mastacembelus shiranus Günther, 1896

Synonyms
- Aethiomastacembelus shiranus (Günther, 1896); Afromastacembelus shiranus (Günther, 1896)

= Malawi spinyeel =

Species of fish

The Malawi spinyeel (Mastacembelus shiranus) is a species of fish in the family Mastacembelidae from Africa. It is endemic to the Lake Malawi basin, including the main lake itself, Lake Malombe and the lower Shire River. It is the only described species of spinyeel in Lake Malawi, but a brightly marked variant, Mastacembelus sp. "Rosette" is also known. It is unclear if it is a variant of the Malawi spinyeel or an undescribed species. The Malawi spinyeel reaches about 30 cm (12 in) in length, and likely feeds on invertebrates and small fish.
