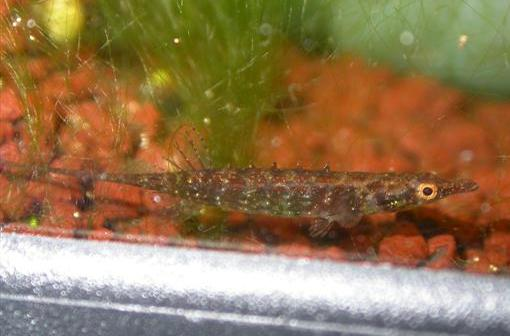
- I. paradoxus in an aquarium

Scientific classification
- Kingdom: Animalia
- Phylum: Chordata
- Class: Actinopterygii
- Order: Synbranchiformes
- Suborder: Indostomoidei
- Family: Indostomidae; Prashad & Mukerji, 1929
- Genus: Indostomus; Prashad & Mukerji, 1929

Type species
- Indostomus paradoxus Prashad & Mukerji, 1929

= Indostomus =

Genus of fishes

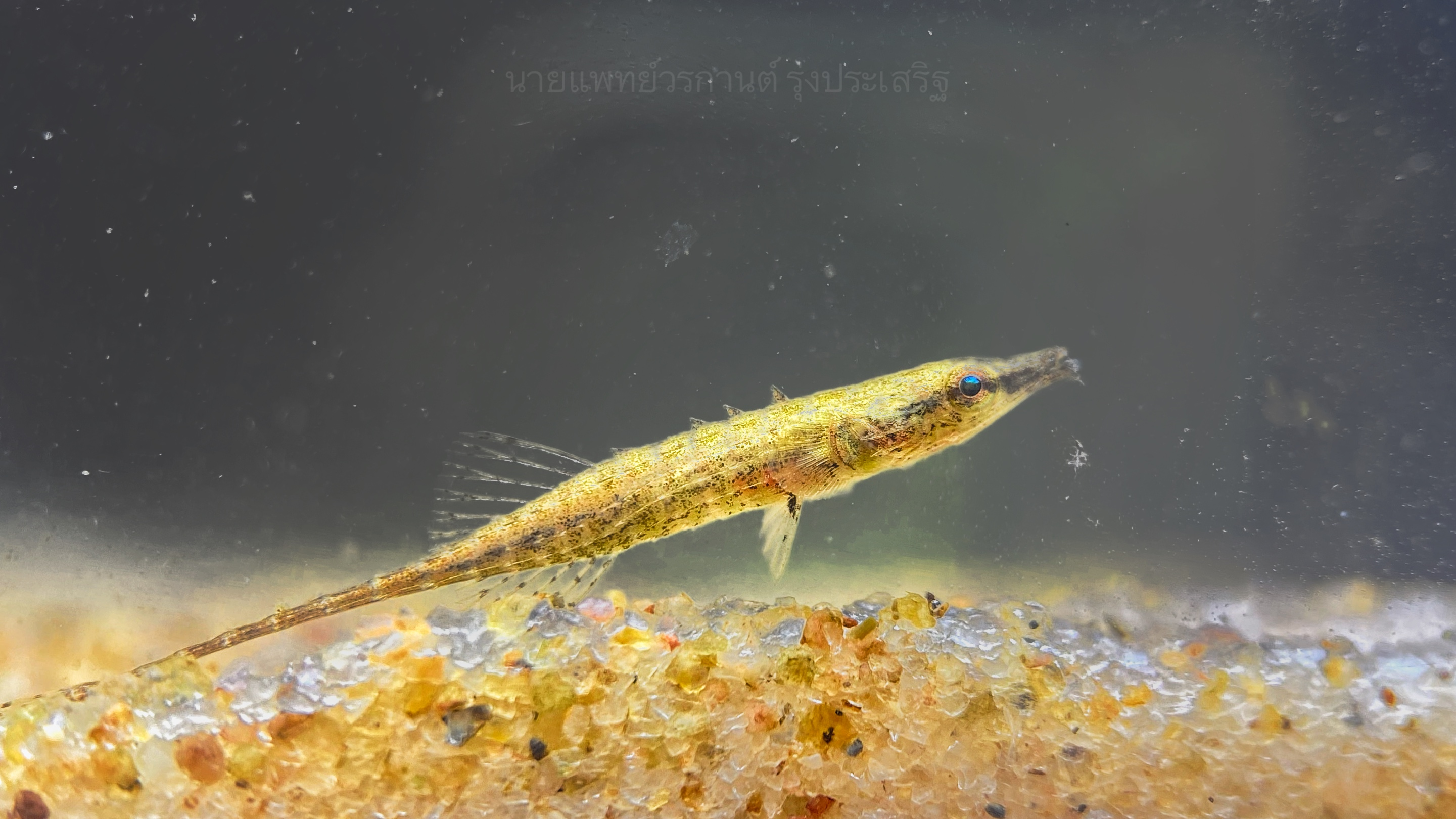
Indostomus crocodilus, This living Specimen collected from a blackwater stream in Toh Daeng Peat swamp forest Narathiwat province, southern Thailand by Worakarn RUNGPRASERT, MD.

Indostomus is a genus of small ray-finned fish native to slow-moving or stagnant freshwater habitats in Indochina. It is the sole genus of the monogeneric family Indostomidae, Long considered to be sticklebacks, within the order Gasterosteiformes, modern analyses place the indostomids within the order Synbranchiformes, which implies that they are related with the spiny eels and swamp eels.

== Taxonomy ==
Indostomus was first proposed as a genus in 1929 by the Indian zoologists Baini Prashad and Dev Dev Mukerji when they described Indostomus paradoxus, giving its type locality as north of the Indawgyi Lake near Nyaungbin in Upper Burma. They erected a new family, Indostomidae, for the genus. Indostomidae was classified within the order Gasterostiformes, specifically within the suborder Gasterosteoidei. Phylogenetics have, however, shown that Gasterostiformes was paraphyletic with the Gasterosteoidei not being sister to the Syngnathoidei and being more closely related to the Zoarcoidei, but that the inclusion of the Indostomidae in the Gasterosteoidei rendered that taxon paraphyletic. However, in the 5th edition of Fishes of the World, Indostomidae was still included in the Gasterosteoidei within the order Scorpaeniformes but other phylogenetic studies have classified the family within the monotypic suborder Indostomoidei within the order Synbranchiformes.

== Description ==
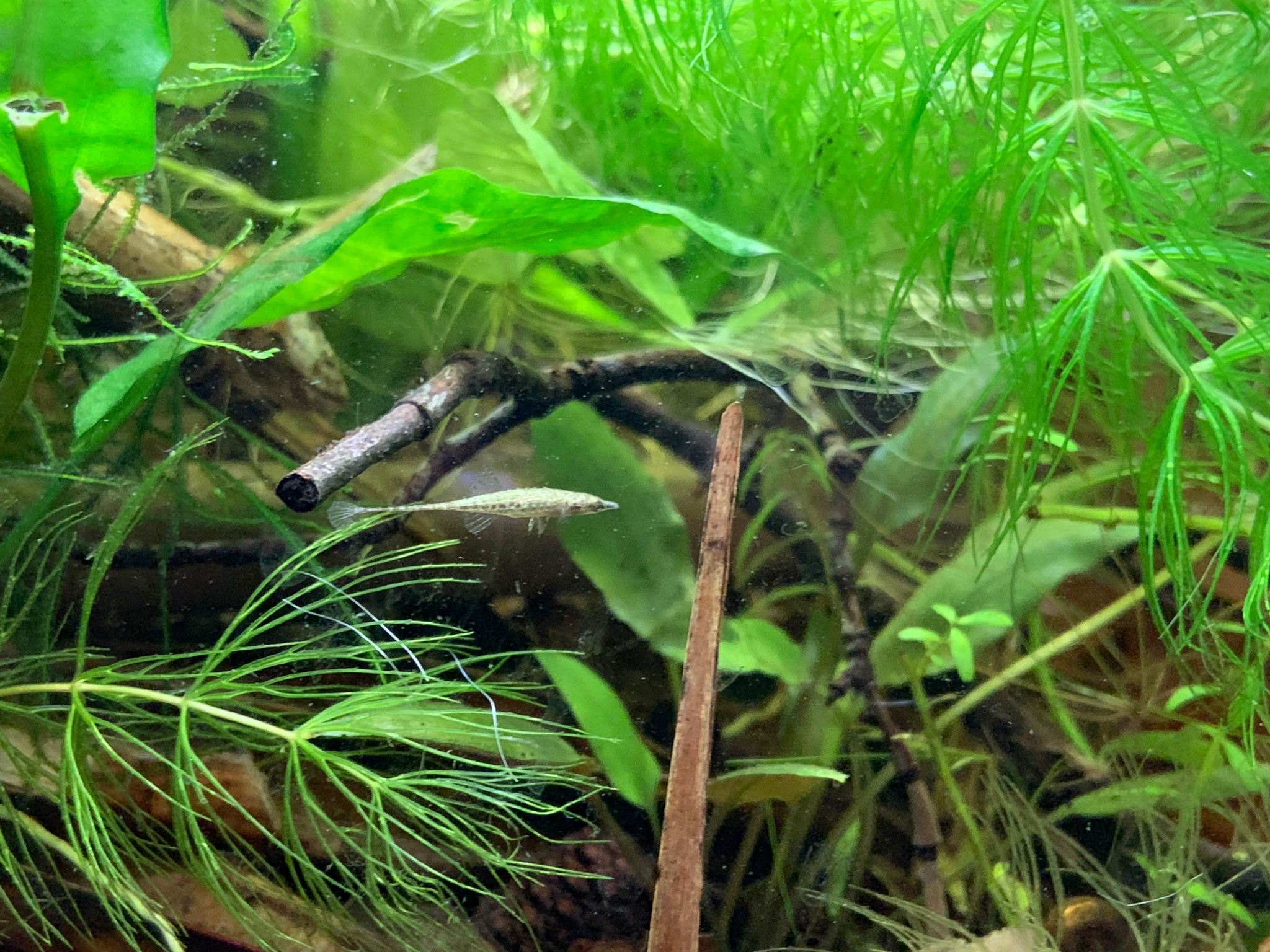
Indostomus crocodilus in a home aquarium

Indostomus species are all incredibly small, on average reaching 3 cm in length at maximum. Their bodies are armored and thin, tapering towards the back, and ending in a small, fan-shaped tail. They are sexually dimorphic, with mature females outwardly showing the presence of eggs with a broader, fuller abdomen, and, in the case of Indostomus crocodilus, mature males have white bands along the edges of the dorsal, anal, and ventral fins.

== Habitat ==
Indostomus species show a clear preference for slow moving and stagnant freshwater wetlands, streams, ponds, and oxbow lakes, including both clearwater and blackwater habitats. They are often found around aquatic plant growth, algae, and decaying organic material such as leaf litter and branches. Sympatric fish include danionins, Dario, and gouramis.

== Behavior and Diet ==
Indostomus are micropredatory fish, predating on small aquatic insects, crustaceans, and worms. In an aquarium setting, Indostomus will often refuse prepared foods, only eating very small live or frozen foods such as copepods, Artemia, Daphnia, or Moina.

Indostomus will spawn in very small caves and crevices, such as in reeds, bamboos, or very small lengths of plastic piping. Males select a spawning site, and guard the eggs and nest until the fry are free-swimming and disperse.

== Species ==
The three currently recognized species in this genus are:

- Indostomus crocodilus Britz & Kottelat, 1999
- Indostomus paradoxus Prashad & Mukerji, 1929 (armoured stickleback, pipe fish)
- Indostomus spinosus Britz & Kottelat, 1999

The type species, Indostomus paradoxus, was discovered in the 1920s in Lake Indawgyi in Myanmar. In the 1990s, the two other species were discovered and placed in this genus.
