= Mastacembelus plagiostomus =

Conservation status
- Least Concern (IUCN 3.1)

Scientific classification
- Kingdom: Animalia
- Phylum: Chordata
- Class: Actinopterygii
- Order: Synbranchiformes
- Family: Mastacembelidae
- Genus: Mastacembelus
- Species: M. plagiostomus

Binomial name
- Mastacembelus plagiostomus Matthes, 1962

Synonyms
- Afromastacembelus plagiostomus (Matthes, 1962); Caecomastacembelus plagiostomus (Matthes, 1962)

Species of fish

Mastacembelus plagiostomus is a species of fish in the family Mastacembelidae. It is found in shallow waters with rock substrates and is endemic to Lake Tanganyika. It grows to 30 centimetres (12 in) standard length.
