= Mastacembelus tanganicae =

Conservation status
- Least Concern (IUCN 3.1)

Scientific classification
- Kingdom: Animalia
- Phylum: Chordata
- Class: Actinopterygii
- Order: Synbranchiformes
- Family: Mastacembelidae
- Genus: Mastacembelus
- Species: M. tanganicae

Binomial name
- Mastacembelus tanganicae Günther, 1893

Synonyms
- Afromastacembelus tanganicae (Günther, 1894); Caecomastacembelus tanganicae (Günther, 1894)

Species of fish

Mastacembelus tanganicae is a species of fish in the family Mastacembelidae. It is endemic to Lake Tanganyika where it occurs in shallow areas with a rocky substrate.
