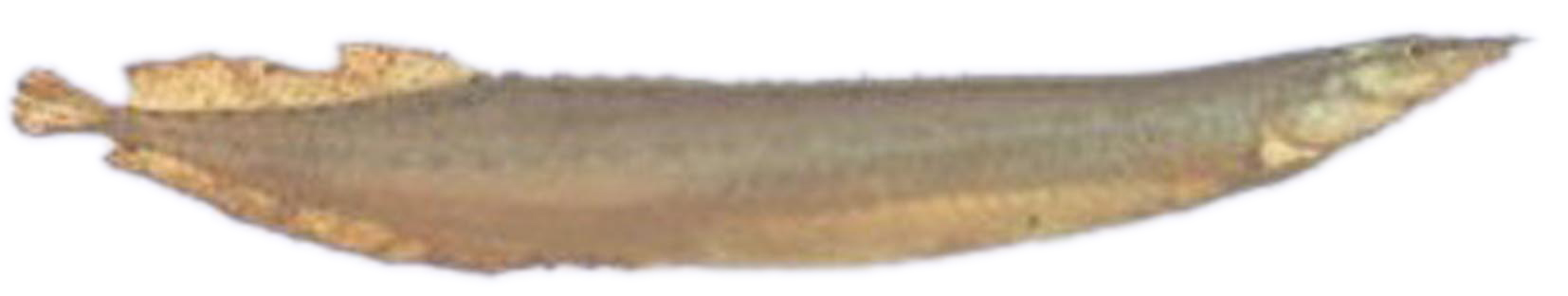

Conservation status
- Least Concern (IUCN 3.1)

Scientific classification
- Kingdom: Animalia
- Phylum: Chordata
- Class: Actinopterygii
- Order: Synbranchiformes
- Family: Mastacembelidae
- Genus: Macrognathus
- Species: M. aral

Binomial name
- Macrognathus aral (Bloch & J.G Schneider, 1801)

Synonyms
- Rhynchobdella aral Bloch & Schneider, 1801; Rhynchobdella dhanashorii Hora, 1921; Macrognathus jammuensis Malhotra & Singh Dutta, 1975

= Macrognathus aral =

Species of fish

Macrognathus aral, the one-stripe spiny eel, is a small fish from Pakistan, India, Bangladesh, Nepal and Myanmar. It can be found in running and stagnant waters of both fresh and brackish water rivers and river deltas. This species is also commonly found in ponds and slow moving streams and rivers with vegetation and silty or mud substrates. They are also believed to be a common occurrence in rice paddies. Individuals of this species can reach a maximum of 63.5 cm (25.0 in) in length.

After mating, eggs are deposited by attaching on to algal masses.

In 2008, researchers discovered that what was once considered to be a population of Macrognathus aral in Sri Lanka, is actually a separate species, Macrognathus pentophthalmos.
