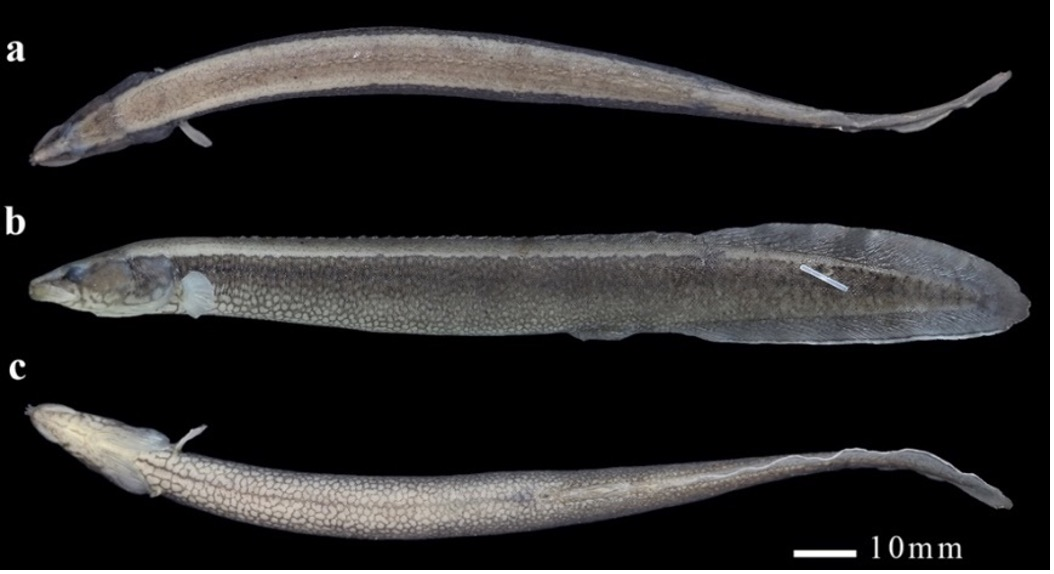

Scientific classification
- Kingdom: Animalia
- Phylum: Chordata
- Class: Actinopterygii
- Order: Synbranchiformes
- Family: Mastacembelidae
- Genus: Sinobdella; Kottelat & Lim, 1994

Type species
- Rhynchobdella sinensis Bleeker, 1870

= Sinobdella =

Genus of fishes

Sinobdella is a genus of eel-like freshwater fishes in the family Mastacembelidae, commonly known as spiny eels. They are found in freshwater river systems and lakes throughout southern and eastern China and northern Vietnam; there is also a presumably extinct species that used to be found in Taiwan.

== Taxonomy ==
Sinobdella is placed in Mastacembelidae alongside Macrognathus and Mastacembelus. It has historically been considered monotypic, containing only S. sinensis. Recently, however, a few new species have been described and assigned to this genus (such as S. longitubulus in 2024), and a few existing species have been moved to the genus from elsewhere.

== Species ==
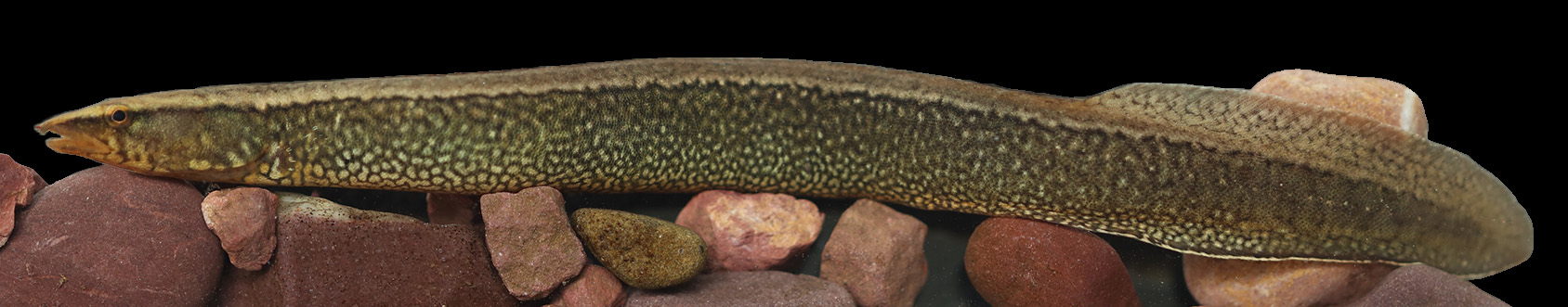
Sinobdella longitubulus

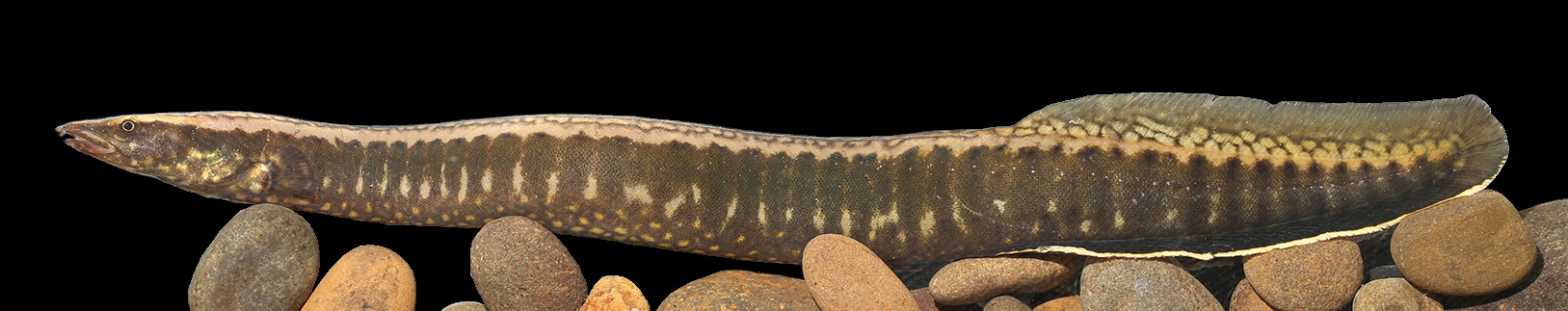
Sinobdella sinensis

As of 2025, there are 6 recognized species in this genus, one of which is presumably extinct:

- Sinobdella anguillaris (Mori, 1928)
- Sinobdella dienbienensis Nguyễn & Nguyễn, 2006
- † Sinobdella kobayashii (Ōshima, 1926)
- Sinobdella longitubulus Shan & Zhang, 2024
- Sinobdella magnificus Endruweit, 2024
- Sinobdella sinensis (Bleeker, 1870)
