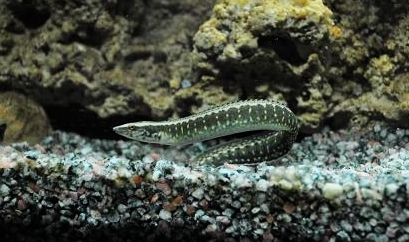

Conservation status
- Least Concern (IUCN 3.1)

Scientific classification
- Kingdom: Animalia
- Phylum: Chordata
- Class: Actinopterygii
- Order: Synbranchiformes
- Family: Mastacembelidae
- Genus: Sinobdella
- Species: S. sinensis

Binomial name
- Sinobdella sinensis (Bleeker, 1870)

Synonyms
- Ophidium aculeatum Basilewsky, 1855; Mastacembelus sinensis (Bleeker, 1870); Rhynchobdella sinensis Bleeker, 1870

= Sinobdella sinensis =

Species of fish

Sinobdella sinensis is an East Asian species of the spiny eel family of the order Synbranchiformes.

This fish is a subtropical species found in rivers in China, Taiwan, and Vietnam. It can grow to 19 cm (7.5 in) TL. It inhabits rivers, feeding on larvae, insects, worms and crustaceans.
