= Gangaichthys =

Scientific classification
- Kingdom: Animalia
- Phylum: Chordata
- Class: Actinopterygii
- Division: Teleostei
- Order: Synbranchiformes
- Family: Chaudhuriidae
- Genus: Gangaichthys; Khandekar, Thackeray, He, Mohapatra & Agarwal 2026
- Species: G. indonepalicus

Binomial name
- Gangaichthys indonepalicus Khandekar, Thackeray, He, Mohapatra & Agarwal 2026

Species of fish

Gangaichthys indonepalicus is a species of subterranean fish from Asia that was first described to science in 2026. It is the only species in the genus Gangaichthys. Researchers first became aware of the species because of a video posted to the "social media platform TikTok in 2024 from the India-Nepal border area that showed a tiny, apparently stygobitic fish, with little melanin and reduced eyes, that had emerged from a borewell." This triggered searches in the area that yielded a new genus and species of earthworm eel.

== See also ==
- Borewells in India
