= Pillaiabrachia =

Scientific classification
- Kingdom: Animalia
- Phylum: Chordata
- Class: Actinopterygii
- Order: Synbranchiformes
- Family: Chaudhuriidae
- Genus: Pillaiabrachia; Britz, 2016
- Species: P. siniae

Binomial name
- Pillaiabrachia siniae Britz, 2016

Genus of fishes

Pillaiabrachia siniae, is a species of earthworm eels found in a small pool near Mogaung in Kachin state, northern Myanmar. This species is the only known member of its genus.
