= Bihunichthys =

Scientific classification
- Kingdom: Animalia
- Phylum: Chordata
- Class: Actinopterygii
- Order: Synbranchiformes
- Family: Chaudhuriidae
- Genus: Bihunichthys; Kottelat & K. K. P. Lim, 1994
- Species: B. monopteroides

Binomial name
- Bihunichthys monopteroides Kottelat & K. K. P. Lim, 1994

Species of fish

Bihunichthys monopteroides is a species of spineless eel native to Indonesia & Malaysia. This species grows to a length of 3.6 centimetres (1.4 in) SL. This species is the only known member of its genus.
