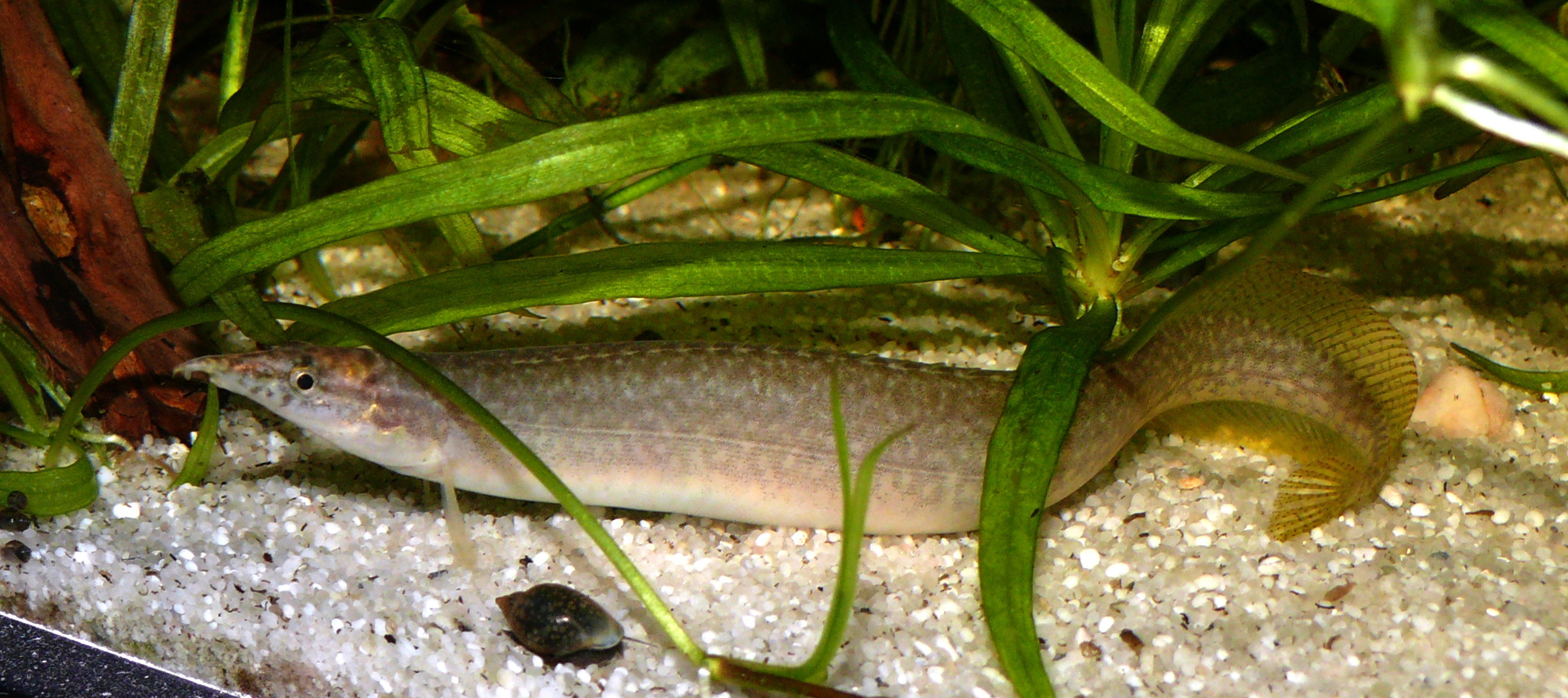

Conservation status
- Least Concern (IUCN 3.1)

Scientific classification
- Kingdom: Animalia
- Phylum: Chordata
- Class: Actinopterygii
- Order: Synbranchiformes
- Family: Mastacembelidae
- Genus: Macrognathus
- Species: M. pancalus

Binomial name
- Macrognathus pancalus (F. Hamilton, 1822)
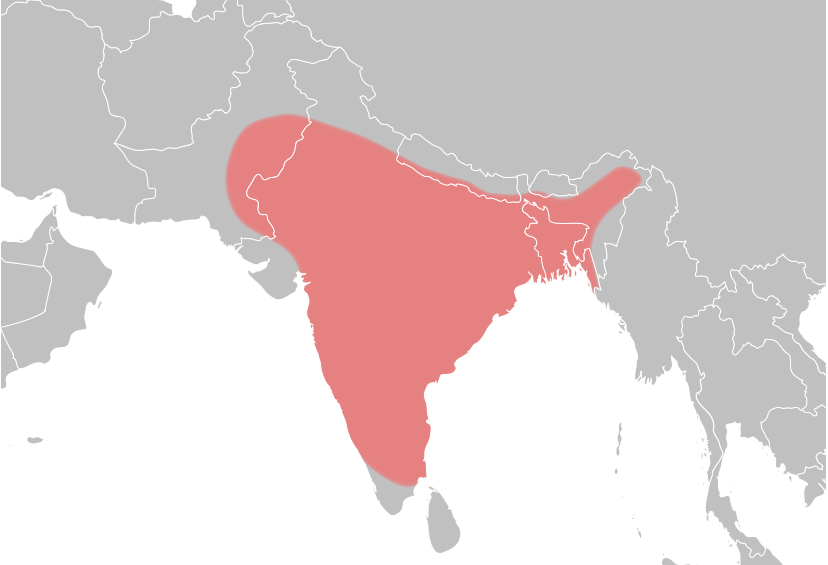
- Natural range includes India, Pakistan, Nepal, Bangladesh, and Bhutan.

Synonyms
- Mastacembelus pancalus (Hamilton, 1822); Mastacembelus punctatus Cuvier, 1832

= Macrognathus pancalus =

Species of fish

Macrognathus pancalus, commonly known as the barred spiny eel or Indian spiny eel, or পাঁকাল in Bengali is a small species of spiny eel from South Asia, where it is usually found inhabiting slow and shallow rivers. Males are more slender and often smaller than the females.

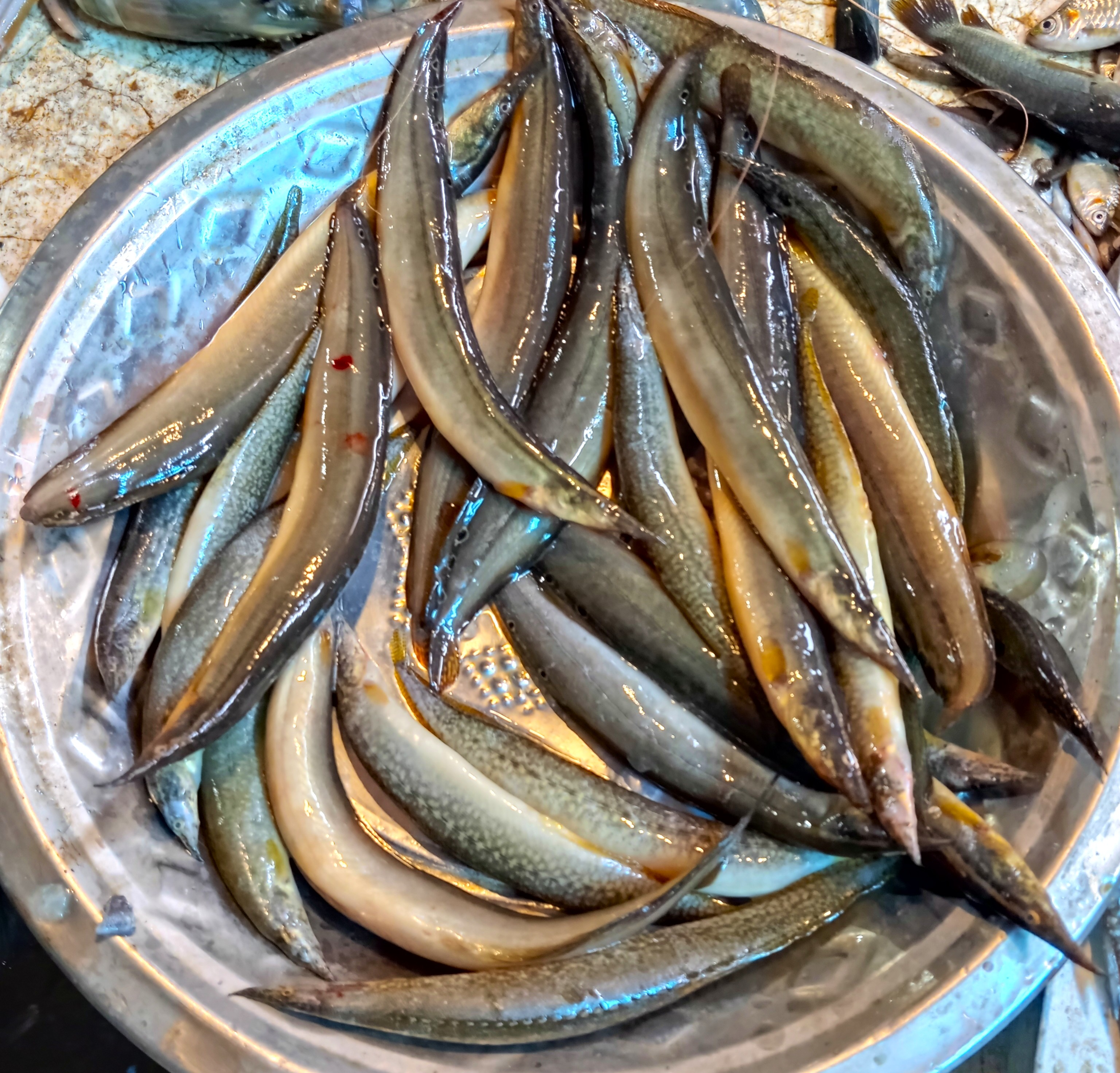
Indian spiny eel (Pankal fish) selling in Kolkata market, West Bengal, India
