= Nagaichthys =

Scientific classification
- Kingdom: Animalia
- Phylum: Chordata
- Class: Actinopterygii
- Division: Teleostei
- Order: Synbranchiformes
- Family: Chaudhuriidae
- Genus: Nagaichthys; Kottelat & K. K. P. Lim, 1991
- Species: N. filipes

Binomial name
- Nagaichthys filipes Kottelat & K. K. P. Lim, 1991

Species of fish

Nagaichthys filipes is a species of spineless eel native to Indonesia and Malaysia. This species grows to a length of 3.1 centimetres (1.2 in) SL. N. filipes is the only known member of its genus.
