= Garo spineless eel =

Conservation status
- Near Threatened (IUCN 3.1)

Scientific classification
- Kingdom: Animalia
- Phylum: Chordata
- Class: Actinopterygii
- Order: Synbranchiformes
- Family: Chaudhuriidae
- Genus: Garo; Yazdani & Talwar, 1981
- Species: G. khajuriai

Binomial name
- Garo khajuriai (Talwar, Yazdani & Kundu, 1977)

Species of fish

The Garo spineless eel (Garo khajuriai) is a species of earthworm eel endemic to India. It belongs to the monotypic genus Garo. It is demersal and lives in fresh water.

== Distribution ==
This species is found in the Garo Hills in Meghalaya and in the Kaziranga Wildlife Sanctuary in Assam, India.
