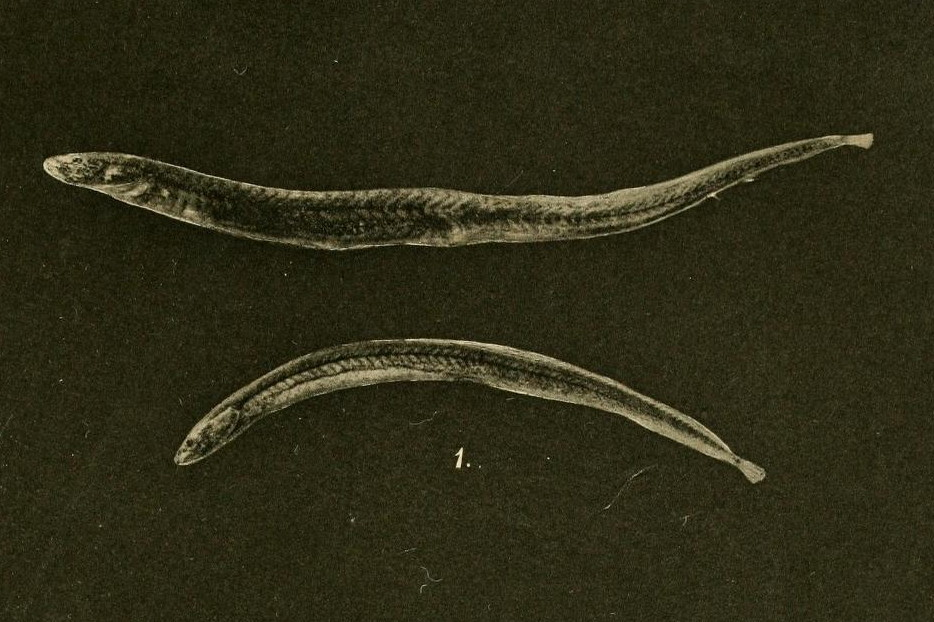
- Chaudhuria caudata

Scientific classification
- Domain: Eukaryota
- Kingdom: Animalia
- Phylum: Chordata
- Class: Actinopterygii
- Order: Synbranchiformes
- Family: Chaudhuriidae
- Genus: Chaudhuria; Annandale, 1918

Type species
- Chaudhuria caudata Annandale, 1918

= Chaudhuria =

Genus of fishes

Chaudhuria is a genus of spineless eels native to Southeast Asia.

== Species ==
There are currently three recognized species in this genus:

- Chaudhuria caudata Annandale, 1918 (Burmese spineless eel)
- Chaudhuria fusipinnis Kottelat & Britz, 2000
- Chaudhuria ritvae Britz, 2010
