= Chendol (fish) =

Scientific classification
- Kingdom: Animalia
- Phylum: Chordata
- Class: Actinopterygii
- Order: Synbranchiformes
- Family: Chaudhuriidae
- Genus: Chendol; Kottelat & K. K. P. Lim, 1994

Type species
- Chendol keelini Kottelat & Lim, 1994

Genus of fishes

Chendol is a small genus of spineless eels native to Southeast Asia.

== Species ==
There are currently two recognized species in this genus:

- Chendol keelini Kottelat & K. K. P. Lim, 1994
- Chendol lubricus Kottelat & K. K. P. Lim, 1994
