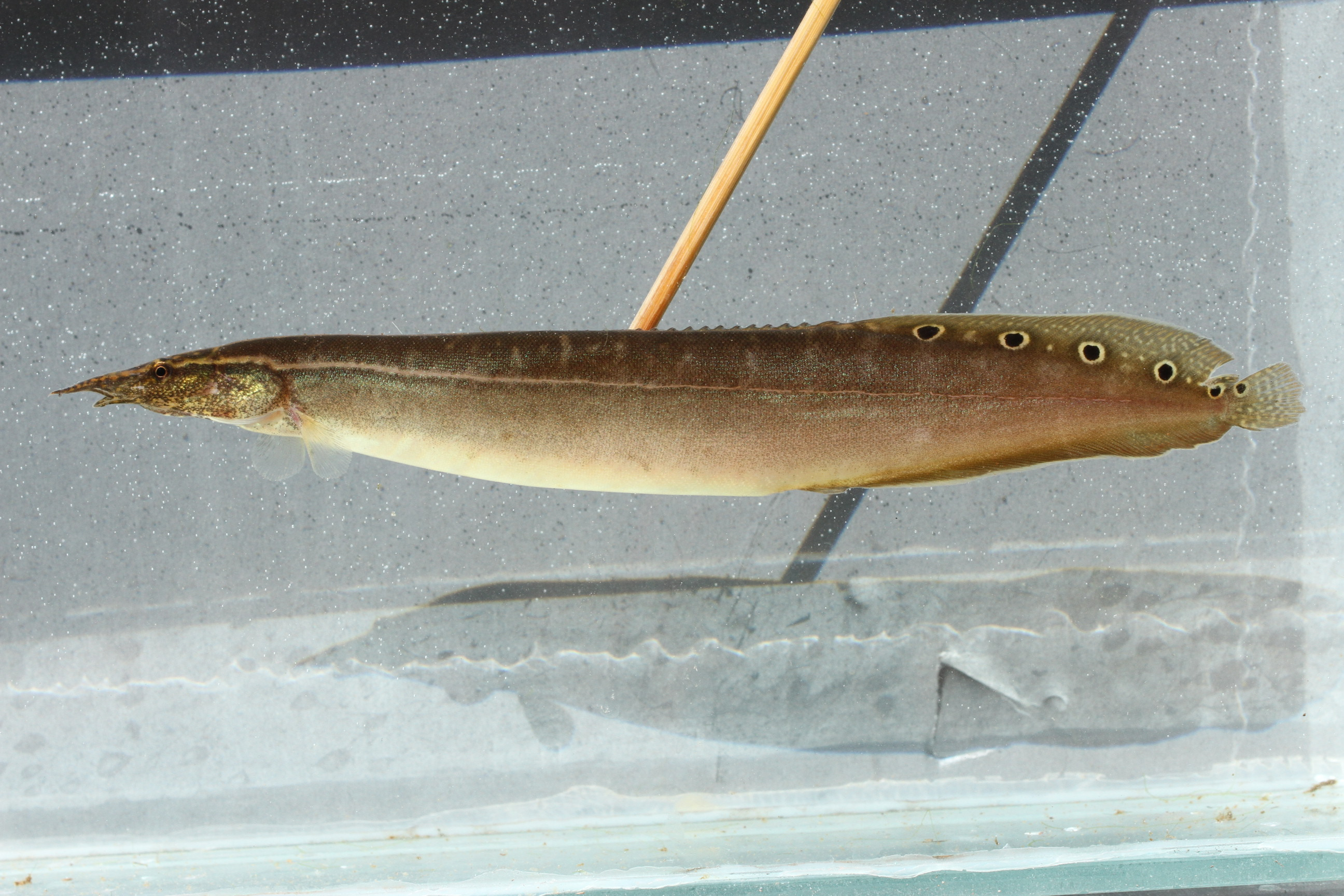
- Peacock eel from Nakhon Phanom, Thailand
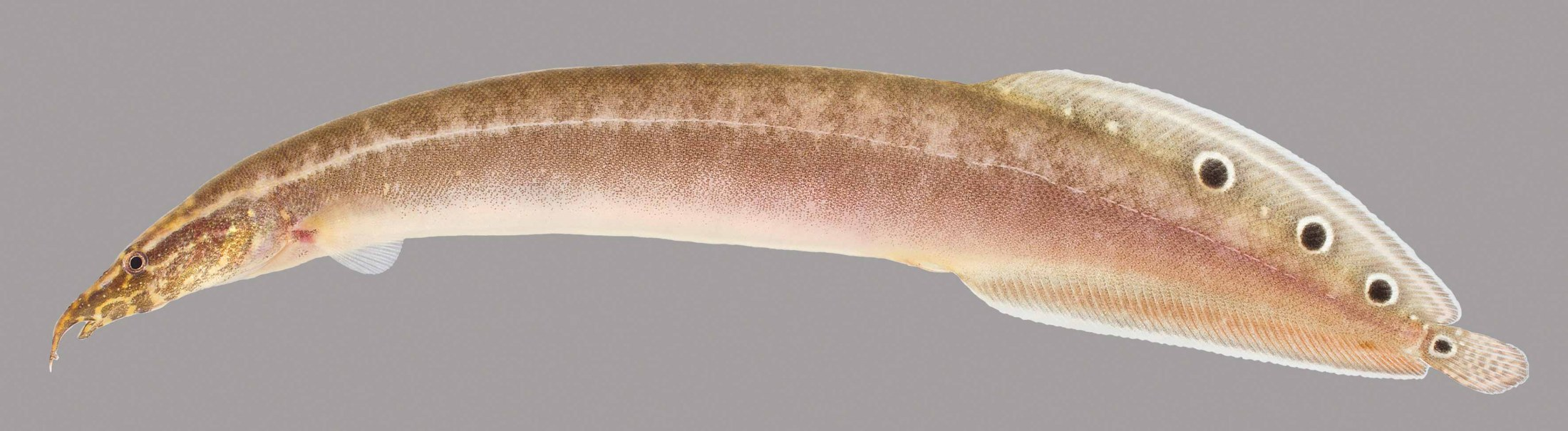
- Peacock spiny eel from Miami-Dade County, Florida

Conservation status
- Least Concern (IUCN 3.1)

Scientific classification
- Kingdom: Animalia
- Phylum: Chordata
- Class: Actinopterygii
- Order: Synbranchiformes
- Family: Mastacembelidae
- Genus: Macrognathus
- Species: M. siamensis

Binomial name
- Macrognathus siamensis (Günther, 1861)

Synonyms
- Rhynchobdella aculeata siamensis Günther, 1861; Mastacembelus siamensis (Günther, 1861)

= Macrognathus siamensis =

Species of fish

Macrognathus siamensis, the peacock eel or spotfin spiny eel, is a spiny eel found in freshwater habitats throughout Southeast Asia. They are commercially important as food and aquarium fish.

== Distribution ==
The peacock eel is native to the Mekong and Chao Phraya basins, which make up the countries of Thailand, Cambodia, Laos, and Vietnam. They are mostly found in slow-moving backwaters that have a sandy or muddy bottom, such as swamps, canals, and ponds.

There is an invasive population of peacock eels in the Everglades region of Florida, most likely being released due to the aquarium trade. The eels were first discovered in the C-111 canal in 2002, and in 2004 were also found to inhabit mangrove swamps further south.

== Description ==
These fish lack scales and require a soft substrate to burrow into, such as sand, mud, or silt. They breed during the wet season when adjacent forests flood. Larvae reach 8 cm (3 in) in length in approximately 60 days after hatching.

This eel can grow up to 30 cm (12 in) in standard length, although 20 cm (8 in) is more common. Males and females are hard to tell apart through external means.

== Ecology ==
Their main diet is small crustaceans, annelids, and fish.
