= Pillaia =

Scientific classification
- Domain: Eukaryota
- Kingdom: Animalia
- Phylum: Chordata
- Class: Actinopterygii
- Order: Synbranchiformes
- Family: Chaudhuriidae
- Genus: Pillaia; Yazdani, 1972

Type species
- Pillaia indica Yazdani, 1972

Genus of fishes

Pillaia is a small genus of spineless eels native to Asia.

== Species ==
There are currently two recognized species in this genus:

- Pillaia indica Yazdani, 1972 (Hillstream spineless eel)
- Pillaia kachinica S. O. Kullander, Britz & F. Fang, 2000
