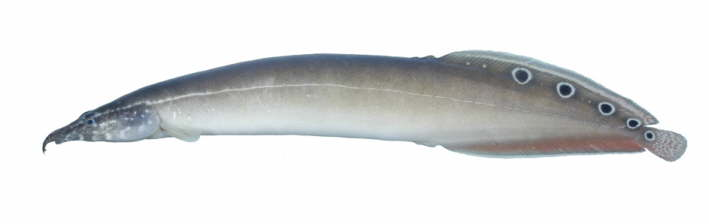
- Peacock Eel (M. siamensis)

Scientific classification
- Kingdom: Animalia
- Phylum: Chordata
- Class: Actinopterygii
- Division: Teleostei
- Order: Synbranchiformes
- Family: Mastacembelidae
- Genus: Macrognathus; Lacépède, 1800

Type species
- Ophidium aculeatum Bloch, 1786

Synonyms
- Rhynchobdella Bloch & J. G. Schneider, 1801

= Macrognathus =

Genus of fishes

Macrognathus is a genus of eel-like fish of the family Mastacembelidae of the order Synbranchiformes.

These fish are distributed throughout most of South and Southeast Asia. Macrognathus species feed on small aquatic insect larvae as well as oligochaetes.

== Appearance and anatomy ==
Most Macrognathus species attain 20–25 cm (8–10 in) in length, but a few surpass this size, with the largest being M. aral at up to 63.5 cm (25 in).

Macrognathus are mostly similar to Mastacembelus. However, they differ in a more modified rostrum, which may be slightly to significantly larger and longer than those found in Mastacembelus. This serves not only to find food but also to help gather food.

== In the aquarium ==
A number of species of this genus are popular aquarium fish. These include the lesser spiny eel, Macrognathus aculeatus, the spotfinned spiny eel, Macrognathus siamensis, as well as others.

== Species ==
According to FishBase, there are currently 25 recognized species in this genus. According to Catalog of Fishes, one of these, M. malabaricus, belongs in the genus Mastacembelus instead of Macrognathus and another, M. taeniagaster, is considered a junior synonym of M. circumcinctus.

- Macrognathus aculeatus (Bloch, 1786) (Lesser spiny eel)
- Macrognathus albus
- Macrognathus aral (Bloch & J. G. Schneider, 1801) (Onestripe spiny eel)
- Macrognathus aureus Britz, 2010
- Macrognathus caudiocellatus (Boulenger, 1893)
- Macrognathus circumcinctus (Hora, 1924)
- Macrognathus dorsiocellatus Britz, 2010
- Macrognathus fasciatus Plamoottil & Abraham, 2014
- Macrognathus guentheri (F. Day, 1865) (Malabar spiny eel)
- Macrognathus keithi (Herre, 1940)
- Macrognathus lineatomaculatus Britz, 2010
- Macrognathus maculatus (G. Cuvier, 1832) (Frecklefin eel)
- Macrognathus malabaricus (Jerdon, 1849)
- Macrognathus meklongensis T. R. Roberts, 1986
- Macrognathus morehensis Arunkumar & Tombi Singh, 2000
- Macrognathus obscurus Britz, 2010
- Macrognathus pancalus F. Hamilton, 1822 (Barred spiny eel)
- Macrognathus pavo Britz, 2010
- Macrognathus pentophthalmos (Gronow, 1854) (extinct?)
- Macrognathus semiocellatus T. R. Roberts, 1986
- Macrognathus siamensis (Günther, 1861) (Peacock eel)
- Macrognathus siangensis Arunkumar, 2016
- Macrognathus taeniagaster (Fowler, 1935)
- Macrognathus tapirus Kottelat & Widjanarti, 2005
- Macrognathus zebrinus (Blyth, 1858) (Zebra spiny eel)
