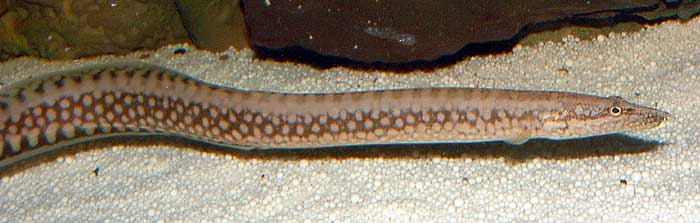
- Mastacembelus moorii

Scientific classification
- Kingdom: Animalia
- Phylum: Chordata
- Class: Actinopterygii
- Order: Synbranchiformes
- Family: Mastacembelidae
- Genus: Mastacembelus; Scopoli, 1777

Type species
- Ophidium mastacembelus J. Banks & Solander, 1794

Species
- See text

Synonyms
- Caecomastacembelus; Aethiomastacembelus; Afromastacembelus

= Mastacembelus =

Genus of fishes

Mastacembelus is a genus of many species of spiny eel fish from the family Mastacembelidae. They are native to Africa (c. 45 species) and Asia (c. 15 species). Most are found in rivers and associated systems (even in rapids), but there are also species in other freshwater habitats and a particularly rich radiation is found in the Lake Tanganyika basin with 15 species (14 endemic). A few species can even occur in brackish water.

== Appearance ==
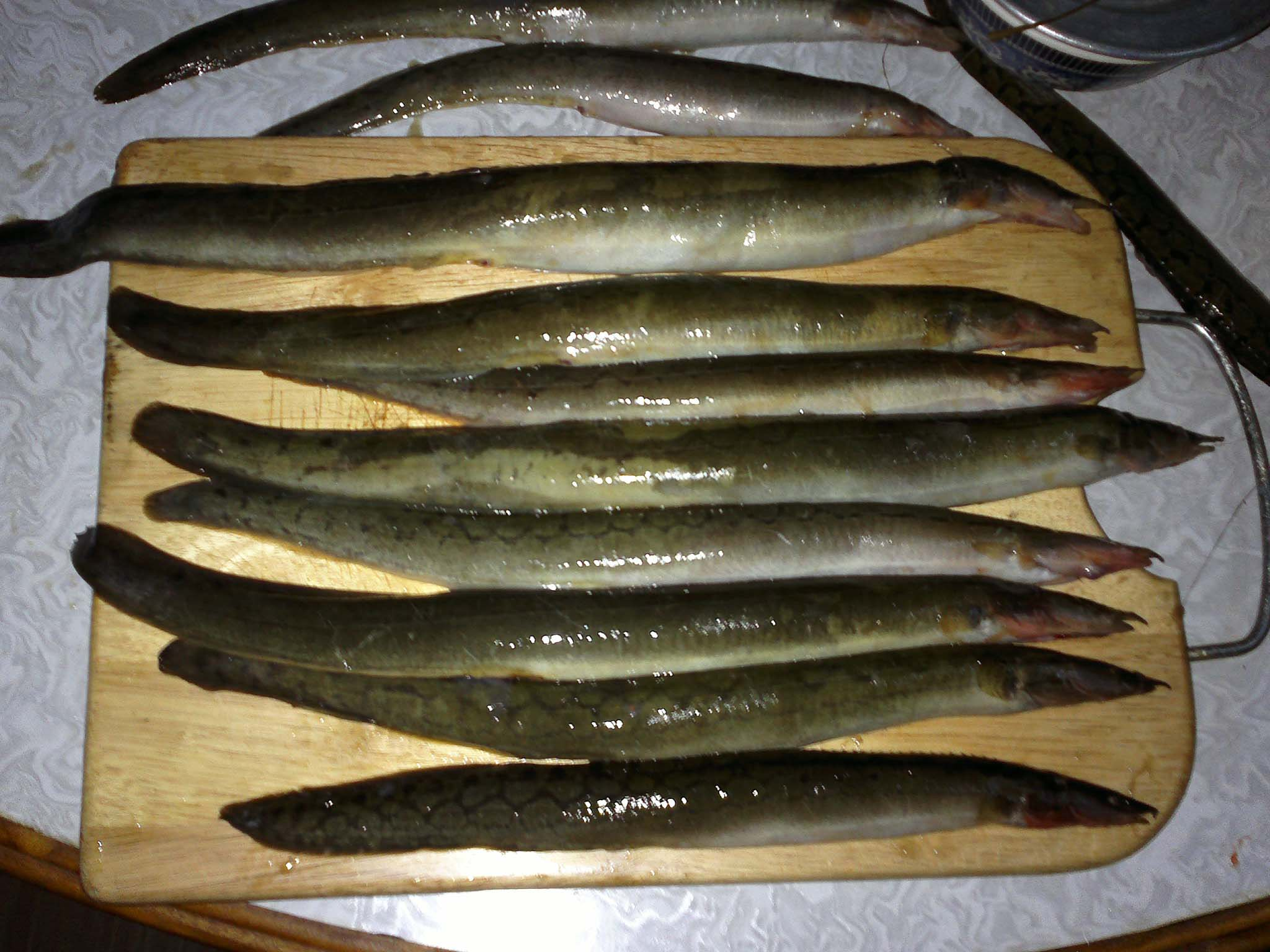
Several Mastacembelus armatus caught in the Tlawng river in India. This species is sometimes kept in aquariums, but also considered a good food fish and eaten in its native range

The size and pattern varies greatly depending on the exact species of Mastacembelus. The smallest are M. latens and M. simba, which only reach a maximum total length of 7–8 cm (2.8–3.1 in). At up to 1 m (3.3 ft), the largest of both the family and this genus is M. erythrotaenia. M. erythrotaenia, often known as the fire eel, is blackish with an orange-red pattern, and it is a popular aquarium fish. Otherwise species in this genus are typically brownish and often have a spotted, speckled or mottled pattern, either in another brown hue, grayish or yellowish. This pattern is reflected in the common name of another species sometimes kept in aquariums, the zig-zag eel M. armatus (alternatively called the tire track eel, a name otherwise used for M. favus). A few others also occasionally appear in the aquarium trade, and some are considered good food fish and eaten locally. M aviceps, M. brichardi, M. crassus and M. latens are found in dark, deep parts of the Congo River and sometimes shallower among rocks. These four species have reduced eyes and are all pinkish-white in color (non-pigmented), similar to cavefish.

== Taxonomy ==
In an evaluation of the Mastacembelidae in 2005, the genera Caecomastacembelus and Aethiomastacembelus (formerly used for the African species) were placed in synonymy with Mastacembelus.

== Species ==
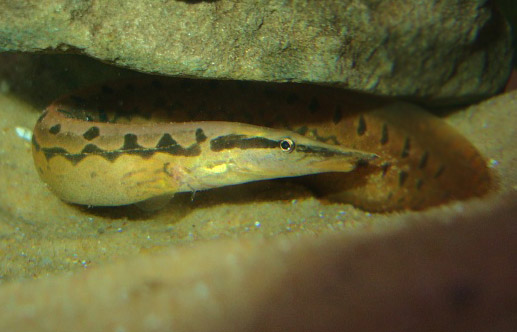
Mastacembelus armatus is a widespread Asian species found in both fresh and brackish water, but as currently defined it is likely a species complex

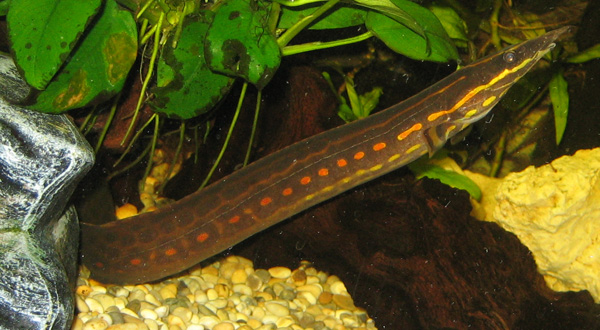
Mastacembelus erythrotaenia is a relatively large, brightly marked Asian species that is highly prized in the aquarium trade.

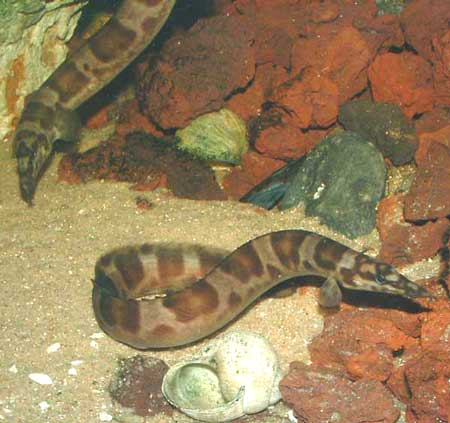
Mastacembelus ellipsifer, one of the many species found only in Lake Tanganyika

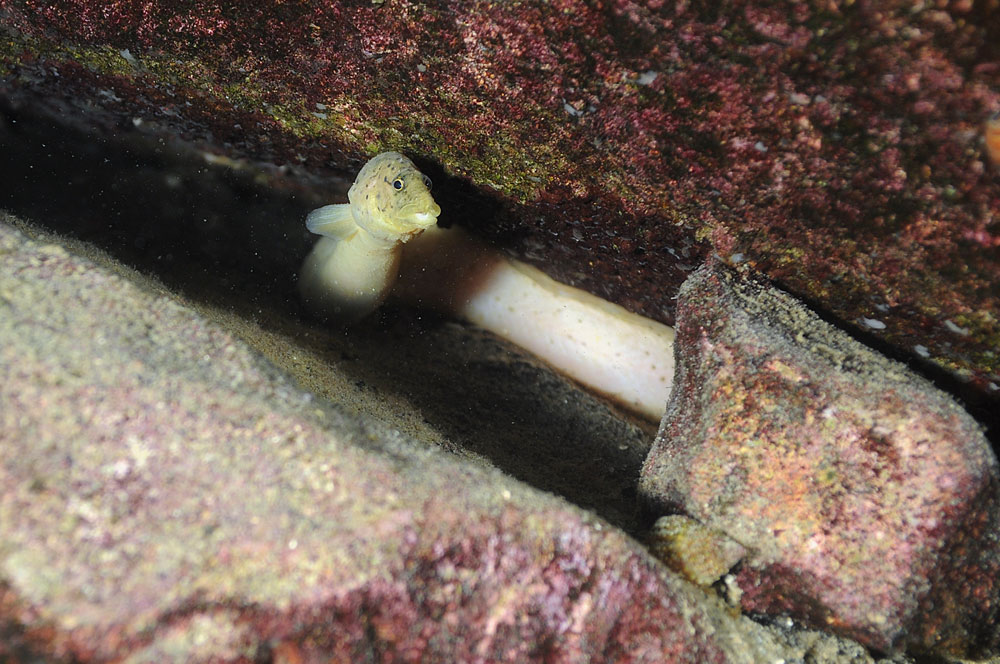
Mastacembelus flavidus, another species found only in Lake Tanganyika

According to FishBase, there are currently 63 recognized species in this genus. Five additional species (marked with a star* in the list) are recognized by Catalog of Fishes.

- Mastacembelus alboguttatus Boulenger, 1893
- Mastacembelus albomaculatus Poll, 1953
- Mastacembelus ansorgii Boulenger, 1905
- Mastacembelus apectoralis K. J. Brown, Britz, I. R. Bills, Rüber & J. J. Day, 2011
- Mastacembelus armatus (Lacépède, 1800) (Zig zag eel)
- Mastacembelus aviceps T. R. Roberts & D. J. Stewart, 1976
- Mastacembelus batesii* Boulenger, 1911
- Mastacembelus brachyrhinus Boulenger, 1899
- Mastacembelus brichardi Poll, (1958) (Blind spiny eel)
- Mastacembelus catchpolei Fowler, 1936
- Mastacembelus congicus Boulenger, 1896
- Mastacembelus crassus T. R. Roberts & D. J. Stewart, 1976
- Mastacembelus cryptacanthus Günther, 1867
- Mastacembelus cunningtoni Boulenger, 1906
- Mastacembelus dayi Boulenger, 1912 – junior synonym of M. alboguttatus according to Catalog of Fishes
- Mastacembelus decorsei Pellegrin, 1919
- Mastacembelus dictyon Britz & Kottelat, 2025
- Mastacembelus dienbienensis V. H. Nguyễn & H. D. Nguyễn, 2005 – belongs in genus Sinobdella according to Catalog of Fishes
- Mastacembelus ellipsifer Boulenger, 1899
- Mastacembelus erythrotaenia Bleeker, 1850 (Fire eel)
- Mastacembelus favus Hora, 1924 (Tire track eel)
- Mastacembelus flavidus Matthes, 1962
- Mastacembelus flavomarginatus* Boulenger, 1898
- Mastacembelus frenatus Boulenger, 1901 (Longtail spiny eel)
- Mastacembelus goro* Boulenger, 1902
- Mastacembelus greshoffi Boulenger, 1901
- Mastacembelus kadeiensis Roberts, 2020
- Mastacembelus kakrimensis Vreven & Teugels, 2005
- Mastacembelus latens T. R. Roberts & D. J. Stewart, 1976
- Mastacembelus liberiensis Boulenger, 1898
- Mastacembelus loennbergii Boulenger, 1898
- Mastacembelus malabaricus* Jerdon, 1849
- Mastacembelus marchei Sauvage, 1879
- Mastacembelus mastacembelus (J. Banks & Solander, 1794)
- Mastacembelus micropectus Matthes, 1962
- Mastacembelus moorii Boulenger, 1898
- Mastacembelus niger Sauvage, 1879
- Mastacembelus nigromarginatus Boulenger, 1898
- Mastacembelus notophthalmus T. R. Roberts, 1989
- Mastacembelus oatesii Boulenger, 1893
- Mastacembelus ophidium Günther, 1894
- Mastacembelus pani* Endruweit, 2024
- Mastacembelus pantherinus Britz, 2007
- Mastacembelus paucispinis Boulenger, 1899
- Mastacembelus plagiostomus Matthes, 1962
- Mastacembelus platysoma Poll & Matthes, 1962
- Mastacembelus polli Vreven, 2005
- Mastacembelus praensis (Travers, 1992)
- Mastacembelus reygeli Vreven & Snoeks, 2009
- Mastacembelus robertsi (Vreven & Teugels, 1996)
- Mastacembelus sanagali Thys van den Audenaerde, 1972
- Mastacembelus seiteri Thys van den Audenaerde, 1972
- Mastacembelus sexdecimspinus (T. R. Roberts & Travers, 1986)
- Mastacembelus shiloangoensis (Vreven, 2004)
- Mastacembelus shiranus Günther, 1896 (Malawi spiny eel)
- Mastacembelus simbi Vreven & Stiassny, 2009
- Mastacembelus strigiventus W. Zhou & L. P. Yang, 2011
- Mastacembelus taiaensis (Travers, 1992)
- Mastacembelus tanganicae Günther, 1894
- Mastacembelus thacbaensis V. H. Nguyễn & H. D. Nguyễn, 2005 – junior synonym of M. undulatus according to Catalog of Fishes
- Mastacembelus tinwini Britz, 2007
- Mastacembelus traversi (Vreven & Teugels, 1997)
- Mastacembelus triolobus W. Zhou & L. P. Yang, 2011
- Mastacembelus trispinosus Steindachner, 1911
- Mastacembelus truttoides* Endruweit, 2024
- Mastacembelus ubangipaucispinis Roberts, 2020
- Mastacembelus undulatus (McClelland, 1844)
- Mastacembelus unicolor G. Cuvier, 1832
- Mastacembelus vanderwaali P. H. Skelton, 1976 (Ocellated spiny eel)
- Mastacembelus zebratus Matthes, 1962
