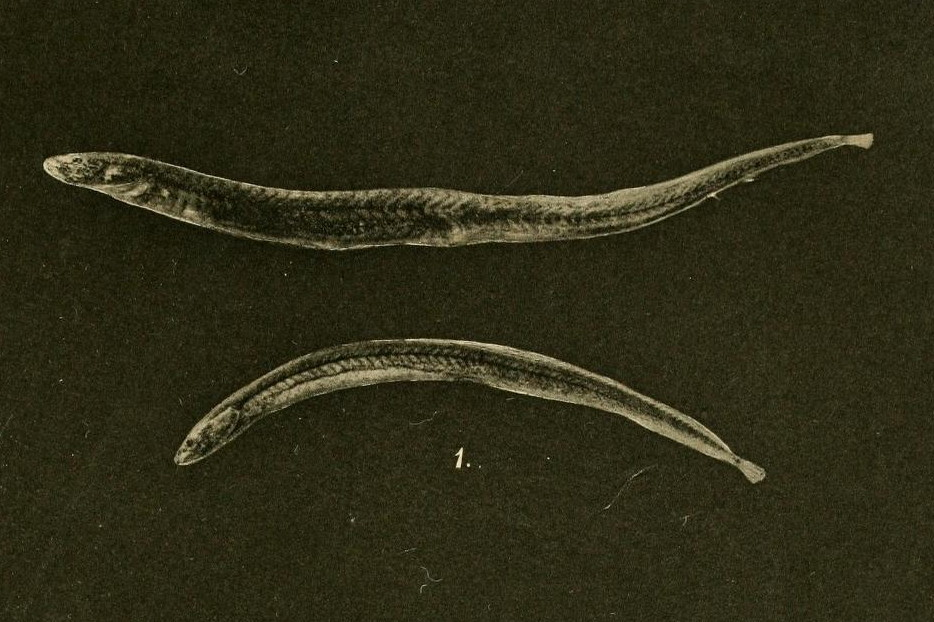
- Chaudhuria caudata

Scientific classification
- Kingdom: Animalia
- Phylum: Chordata
- Class: Actinopterygii
- Division: Teleostei
- Order: Synbranchiformes
- Suborder: Mastacembeloidei
- Family: Chaudhuriidae; Annandale, 1918

Genera
- Bihunichthys Kottelat & Lim, 1994; Chaudhuria Annandale, 1918; Chendol Kottelat & Lim, 1994; Gangaichthys Khandekar, Thackeray, He, Mohapatra & Agarwal, 2026; Garo Yazdani & Talwar, 1981; Nagaichthys Kottelat & Lim, 1991; Pillaia Yazdani, 1972; Pillaiabrachia Britz, 2016

= Earthworm eel =

Family of fishes

Chaudhuriidae is a family of small freshwater eel-like fish related to the swamp eels and spiny eels, commonly known as the earthworm eels. The known species are literally the size and shape of earthworms, thus the family name. While one species, Chaudhuria caudata was reported from the Inle Lake by Nelson Annandale in 1918, the others have been only recently reported (since the 1970s), all in the eastern Asia area, from India to Korea.

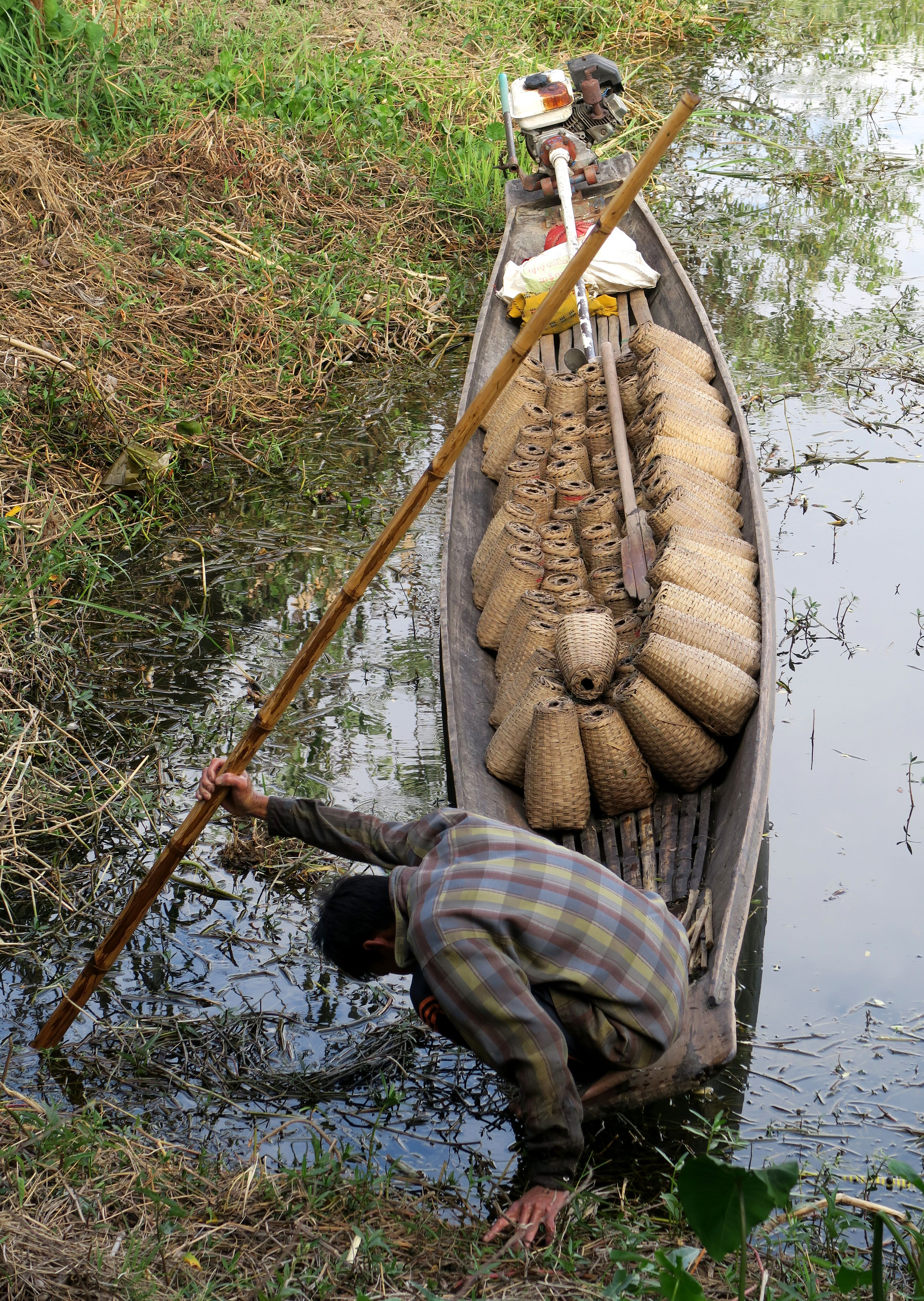
Positioning eel traps in Inle Lake (Myanmar).

Neither the dorsal nor anal fins have spines, and in Nagaichthys and Pillaia they have fused with the caudal fin; in the other genera, the caudal is small but separate. Their bodies have no scales. The few specimens found to date have been no longer than 8 cm (3.1 in), and Nagaichthys filipes is only known to reach 3.1 cm (1.2 in). The eyes are small, covered in thick skin. Almost nothing is known of the habits and biology of the earthworm eels.

The family name "Chaudhuriidae" comes the genus name Chaudhuria, expanded to family level. Both names honour B. L. Chaudhuri (d. 1931) for his assistance in writing the initial paper that erected both the genus and family.
