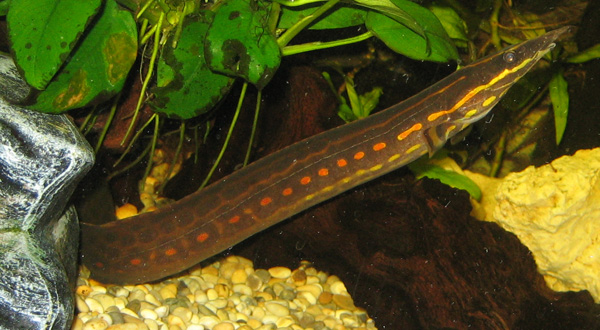

Conservation status
- Least Concern (IUCN 3.1)

Scientific classification
- Kingdom: Animalia
- Phylum: Chordata
- Class: Actinopterygii
- Order: Synbranchiformes
- Family: Mastacembelidae
- Genus: Mastacembelus
- Species: M. erythrotaenia

Binomial name
- Mastacembelus erythrotaenia Bleeker, 1850

Synonyms
- Macrognathus erythrotaenia (Bleeker, 1850); Mastacembelus argus Günther, 1861

= Fire eel =

Species of fish

The fire eel (Mastacembelus erythrotaenia) is a relatively large species of spiny eel. This omnivorous freshwater fish is native to Southeast Asia but is also found in the aquarium trade. Although it has declined locally (especially in parts of Cambodia and Thailand) due to overfishing, it remains common overall.

== Description ==
The fire eel is not a true eel, but an extremely elongated percomorph fish with a distinctive pointed snout and underslung mouth. It is part of spiny eels family, Mastacembelidae. The group gets its common name from the many small dorsal spines that precede the dorsal fin.

The body is laterally compressed, particularly the rear third, where it flattens as it joins the caudal fin and forms an extended tail. The fire eel's base coloring is dark brown/grey, while the belly is generally a lighter shade of the same color. Several bright red lateral stripes and spots mark the body and vary in intensity depending on the age and condition of the individual. Usually, the markings are yellow/amber in juvenile fish, changing to a deep red in larger ones. Often the anal, pectoral, and dorsal fins have a red edging.

The fire eel is the largest species in its family and can reach up to 1 m (3.3 ft) in length.

== Range, habitat and behavior ==
Fire eels occur across a relatively broad area covering a large part of lowland Southeast Asia, including central and southern Thailand, Cambodia, southern Vietnam, Peninsular Malaysia, Borneo (Brunei, Indonesia and Malaysia), and Sumatra (Indonesia). They inhabit slow-moving rivers and flood plains, and are bottom-dwellers that typically are found in places with a muddy bottom. They spend large portions of their time buried in the riverbed, often leaving only their snout visible.

The fire eel feeds on invertebrates (such as insect larvae, worms, and crustaceans), smaller fish, plant matter, and detritus. In captivity, they only rarely eat plant matter.
