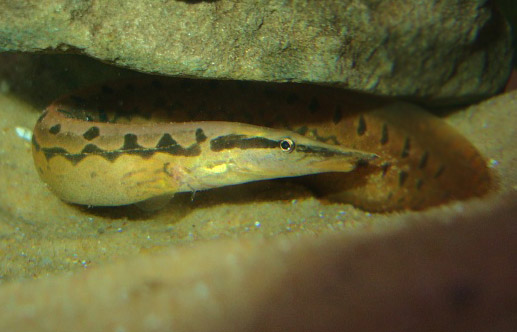

Conservation status
- Least Concern (IUCN 3.1)

Scientific classification
- Kingdom: Animalia
- Phylum: Chordata
- Class: Actinopterygii
- Division: Teleostei
- Order: Synbranchiformes
- Family: Mastacembelidae
- Genus: Mastacembelus
- Species: M. armatus

Binomial name
- Mastacembelus armatus (Lacépède, 1800)

Synonyms
- Macrognathus armatus Lacepède, 1800; Mastacembelus ponticerianus Cuvier, 1832; Mastacembelus marmoratus Cuvier, 1832; Macrognathus caudatus McClelland, 1842; Macrognathus hamiltonii McClelland, 1844; Mastacembelus manipurensis Hora, 1921

= Zig-zag eel =

Species of fish

The zig-zag eel (Mastacembelus armatus Scopoli, 1777), also known as the Baim, tire-track, tire-track spiny-eel, freshwater spiny eel, or marbled spiny eel, is a species of freshwater ray-finned fish in the family Mastacembelidae. It is native to the riverine systems of the Indian Subcontinent (India, Bangladesh, Pakistan, Nepal), Sri Lanka, South China, Malaysia, Thailand, Vietnam, Cambodia, Indonesia, and other parts of South and Southeast Asia. The species was initially described as Macrognathus armature (Lacépède, 1800). Other common names for this popular captive species include the leopard spiny eel and white-spotted spiny eel.

This eel has remained fairly popular as an aquarium fish for years, owing to its unique appearance and behaviors. Additionally, like other species of eels throughout the world, the zig-zag eel serves as a viable protein and food source for humans, aquatic reptiles, birds and other, larger fishes throughout much of its range. As a food source, zig-zag eels are consumed locally along the rivers they inhabit and are prepared in various ways including, smoked, barbecued, fried, curried, pickled, and dried. In traditional medicinal practices in Punjab, the oral ingestion of the meat and topical application of the skin and oil of the fish is used as a treatment for muscle soreness.

== Description ==
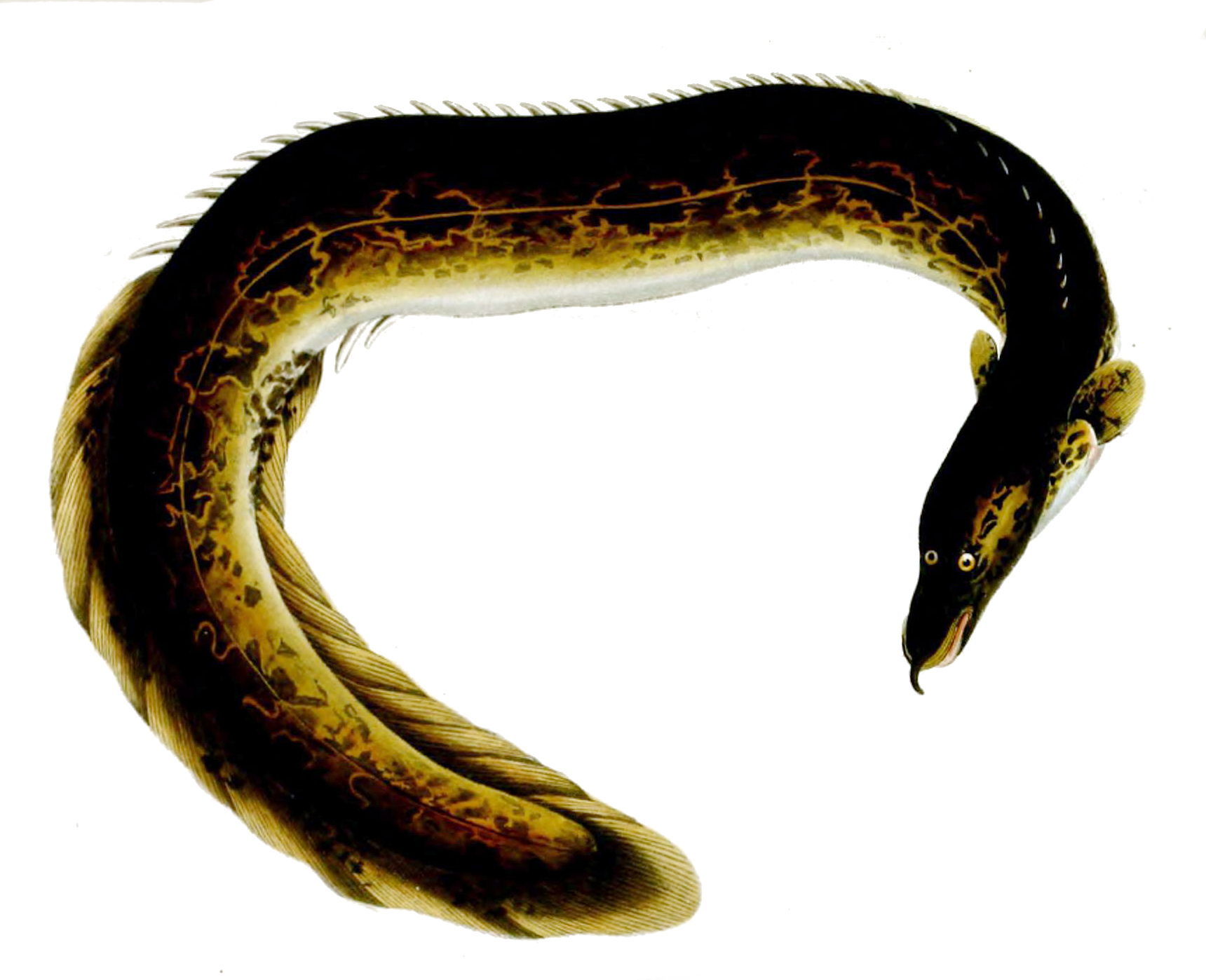

Mastacembelus armatus is a large elongated fish that has a snake-like body without pelvic fins. Its anal and dorsal fins are elongated and are connected to the caudal fin. The dorsal fin is preceded by numerous spines. A pattern of black dots is located on either side of the dorsal fin mimicking the pattern of the sandy and rocky substrates it dwells among to hide from predatory fishes looking down from above. The back is dark beige in color while the head is silver-beige. The body's color is dull brown and the belly is a lighter shade of brown. The brown tones of the zig-zag eel's coloration grant an advantage in concealing itself from both predators and prey in the turbid water environments that it inhabits. The body may also be marked with brown circular patterns. The body also has one to three darker longitudinal zigzag lines that connect to form a distinct reticulated pattern that is restricted to the dorsal two-thirds of the body. The eyes have brown stripes running laterally through them. Zig-zag eels lack gill rackers as they are adapted to a predatory diet.

Mastacembelus armatus can reach up to 36 in (91 cm) in its natural habitat but does not usually exceed 20 inches (51 cm) in captivity. Typically adult males range from 37 to 49 cm in the wild and females range from 40 to 52 cm while juveniles tend to range from 14 to 27 cm in length.

Mastacembelus armatus also have unique variations in its internal physiology that indicate adaptation to its environmental niche. This species has two pairs of nostrils that help it detect changes in its turbid water surroundings and detect chemical cues associated with food making it an excellent ambush predator. Its elongated snout has tube-shaped anterior nostrils and oval-shaped posterior nostrils located near the eye. Mastacembelus armatus exhibit interspecific variation in the number of olfactory lamellae, structures that aid the fish in scent recognition. Individuals possess various numbers ranging from 60 to 76 lamellae.

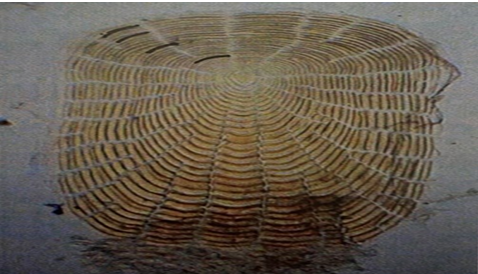
The presence of 4 distinct growth rings on the scale of this fish indicates 4 years of age.

The age of a zig-zag eel can be determined by the length of the fish and the radius of its scales which have a linear relationship. As these fish age they develop growth ring on their scales called annuli. These rings form during the annual monsoon season and the fish faces changes in food availability and spawning pressures that limit growth during this season. Zig-zag eels sampled from their natural habitat average about four annuli maximum on their scales suggesting a longevity of four years in the wild.

Despite its eel-like appearance, Mastacembelus armatus is not considered a true eel as it belongs to the order synbranchiformes rather than anguiliformes.

== Habitat and distribution ==
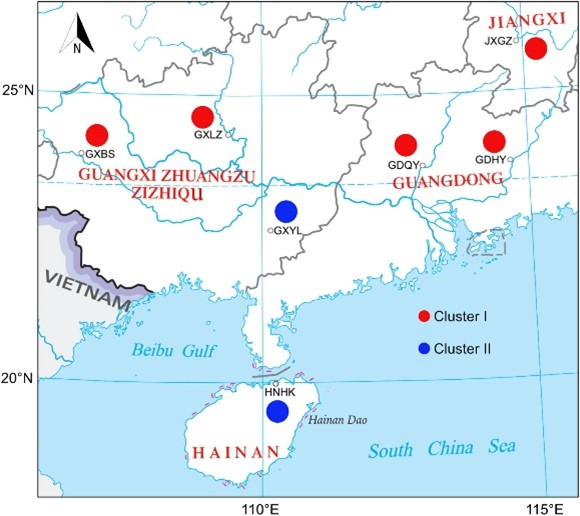
As these eels migrate to spawn in specific streams 2 distinct genetic clusters have formed in the Beibi gulf.

Mastacembelus armatus are nocturnal fish that thrive in highland streams, lowland wetlands, still waters, coastal marshes and rivers with sandy or rocky riverbeds and heavy vegetation. These potamodromous fish migrate throughout rivers and streams. Their migratory behavior results in genetic variation between populations that are not connected through river systems or do not interact along their migratory routes. Most zig-zag eels best tolerate a pH range of 6.5–7.5 and prefer tropical water temperatures between 22 and 28 °C. However, Some populations live in rivers at higher elevation where the water is supplied by snow melt from the Himalayas and can withstand much cooler water temperatures. They are common during the tropical summer months and will dwell in canals, lakes and other floodplain areas during the flood season.

=== Feeding ===
Being nocturnal carnivores, zig-zag eels forage on benthic insect larvae, earthworms, blackworms and some submerged plant material. Zig-zag eels mainly feed on small teleosts making up 30–40% of their diet. Teleosts consumed include Barilus, Aspidoparia, Salmophasia, Gudusia, Gonialosa, Chela, and Sicamugil. The second largest part of their diet is insects making up ~25% of their food intake and mostly consisting of dipteran larvae. This is followed by mollusks that make up ~17% of their diet and is largely made up of Bellamya and Corbicula. Crustaceans and annelids formed a smaller portion of the diet, with the presence of shrimps and crabs indicating bottom-feeding behavior. The majority of the diet being made of teleosts suggests majority of feeding takes place suspended in water column. This species swallows prey whole, as it lacks the jaw structures to chew.

Their diet changes depending on seasonal availability of food sources and they consume more small fishes in the summer and freshwater prawns in winter months. Feeding intensity changes with physiological changes in growth reproductive development as well as seasonal environmental changes. Juvenile feeding intensity peaks in early winter, while male and female adult feeding intensity peaks in early summer and late winter respectively. Mastacembelus armatus fulfils the role of an intermediate predator in the freshwater ecosystem. Reduction in populations of this species poses a risk of trophic cascade. In an aquarium setting, they require live foods in their diet such as live fish, tubifex worms, brine shrimps, mosquito larvae, frozen bloodworms, cyclops, krill and ocean plankton.

=== Reproduction ===
Male and female zig-zag eels are only distinguishable when mature. Females are normally plumper than males. The relatively low fecundity of zig-zag eels leaves them vulnerable to exploitation through overfishing and population decline from pollutants. In their natural habitat, these fishes spawn underneath rocky substrates during the monsoon season. There are no known successful breeding programs in captivity but efforts are being made to expand knowledge of successful captive breeding in order to expand the use of this species in aquaculture.

== Conservation status ==
Globally categorized as least concern yet endangered in Bangladesh as of 2000. Considered vulnerable in Telangana and Tamil Nadu but least concern in Pakistan. Threats to the population of zig-zag eels includes habitat loss, pollution and overfishing. Heavy metal and metalloid pollutants in the rivers Mastacembelus armatus inhabits results in depletion of tissue glutathione content, increase in liver peroxidation, and decreased antioxidant enzyme activity. These three conditions are direct impacts of oxidative stress caused by chemical pollutants and raise concern for bioaccumulation of toxins. Consumption of fish exposed to these pollutants can have adverse health effects and efforts to reduce river pollution to benefit human health supports the health of this species as well.

== In aquarium ==
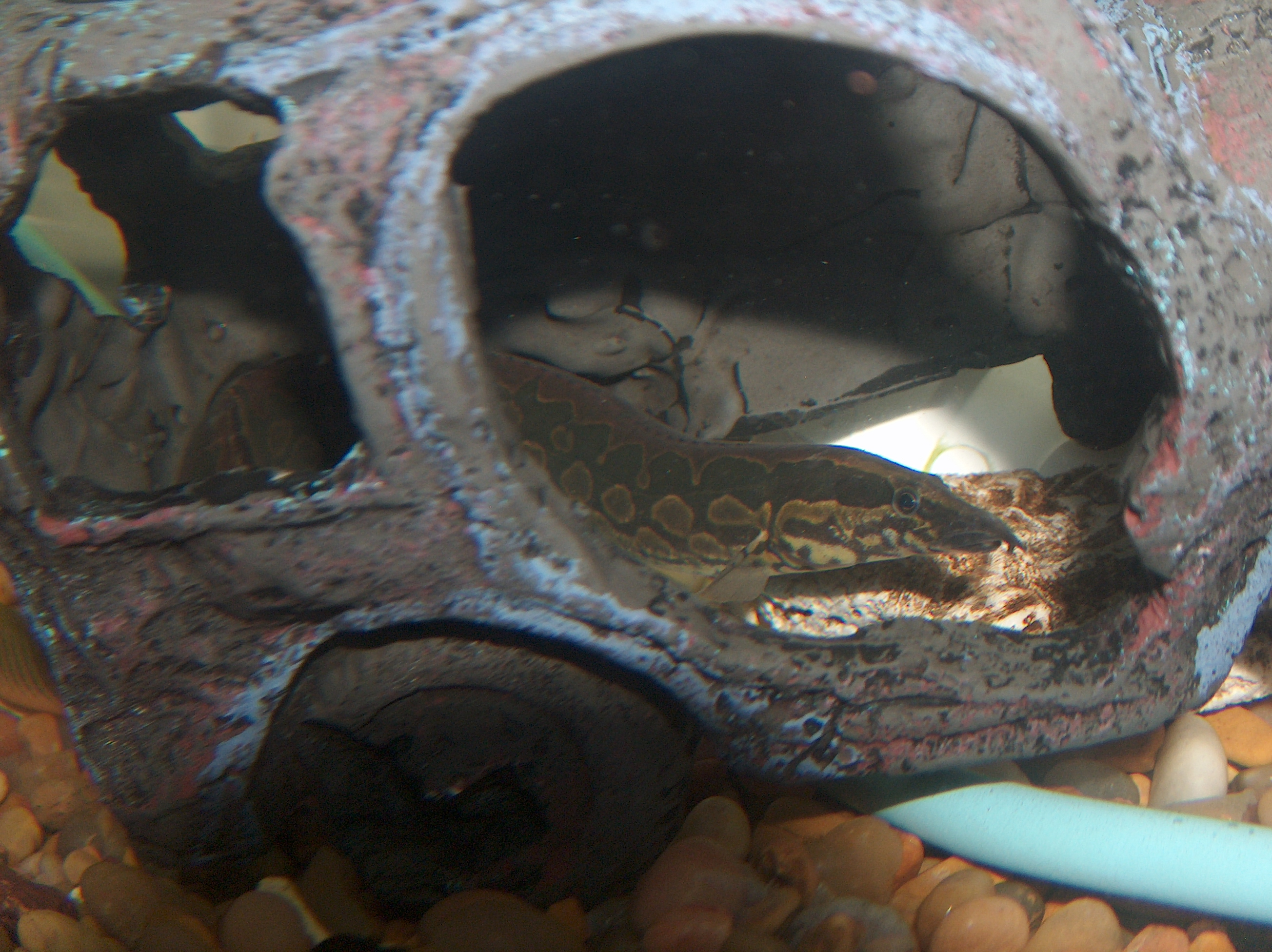
Tire track eel hiding in a decorative car

=== Maintenance ===
Mastacembelus armatus are bottom dwellers and substrate diggers. Those that are 6 in (15 cm) long do well in tanks measuring 36 in (91 cm) with a capacity of 35 gallons (132 liters). However, larger M. armatus necessitate aquariums measuring at least 48 in (120 cm) with 55 gallons (209 liters) capacity. Zig-zag eels do well in freshwater or slightly brackish aquatic environments (produced by adding two teaspoons of sea salt (not iodized) per 2 1/2 gallons of water) with 6 to 25 dH water hardness, with pH readings ranging from 6 to 8, and temperatures that are maintained between 73 and 81 °F (23 and 27 °C).

M. armatus tend to uproot plants and disturb decorations.

=== Compatibility ===
Although zig-zag eels are often combined with medium to large-sized gouramis, knifefish, danios, loaches, Loricariids, eartheaters, acaras, Cichlasoma and Asian catfishes in a community fish aquarium, they are not normally mixed with small-sized fish, because tire track eels are observed to prey upon smaller fish. Mixing them with fish belonging to the same species is also not recommended. This is because they are aggressive to members of the same fish family but peaceful to other fish species with similar care level requirements, size, and temperament.
