= Nyaungbin, Kawa =

Nyaungbin
- Location within Myanmar
- Coordinates: 16°58′31″N 96°26′34″E
- Country: Myanmar
- Region: Bago Region
- District: Bago District
- Township: Kawa Township

Nyaungbin (Burmese: ညောင်ပင်) is a village in Kawa Township, Bago Region, Myanmar.
