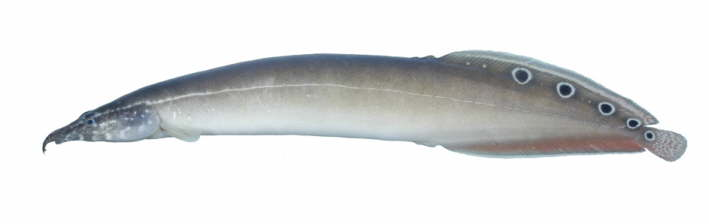
- Macrognathus siamensis

Scientific classification
- Kingdom: Animalia
- Phylum: Chordata
- Class: Actinopterygii
- Order: Synbranchiformes
- Suborder: Mastacembeloidei
- Family: Mastacembelidae; Swainson, 1839

Type species
- Ophidium mastacembelus J. Banks & Solander, 1794

Genera
- Macrognathus Lacépède, 1800; Mastacembelus Scopoli, 1777; Sinobdella Kottelat & K. K. P. Lim, 1994

= Mastacembelidae =

Mastacembelidae Temporal range: Middle Miocene–present

Family of fishes

The Mastacembelidae are a family of fishes, known as the spiny eels. The Mastacembelids are part of the Order Synbranchiformes, the swamp eels, which are part of the Actinopterygii (ray-finned fishes).

In an evaluation of the family in 2004, the subfamilies of Mastacembelidae were found to not be well supported and were rejected. Also, the genera Caecomastacembelus and Aethiomastacembelus were placed in synonymy with Mastacembelus.

These fish originate from Africa, and southern and eastern Asia. Spiny eels generally inhabit soft-bottomed habitats in fresh and occasionally brackish water. Some species burrow in the substrate during the day or for certain months and have been found buried in soil in drying periods.

These fish have an eel-like body. The largest species can reach a maximum length of 1 m (3.3 ft). Very characteristic of this group is the long nose appendage with two tubulated nostrils. Mastacembelids have a series of well-separated dorsal spines on their back, hence the name of their family, spiny eels.

In some areas these fish are regarded as food fish. Several species of Mastacembelidae are aquarium fish, such as the fire eel.

A fossil specimen of an indeterminate mastacembelid is known from the Middle Miocene of Iki Island, Japan.
