= Micrurus nattereri =

Conservation status
- Least Concern (IUCN 3.1)

Scientific classification
- Kingdom: Animalia
- Phylum: Chordata
- Class: Reptilia
- Order: Squamata
- Suborder: Serpentes
- Family: Elapidae
- Genus: Micrurus
- Species: M. nattereri

Binomial name
- Micrurus nattereri Schmidt, 1952
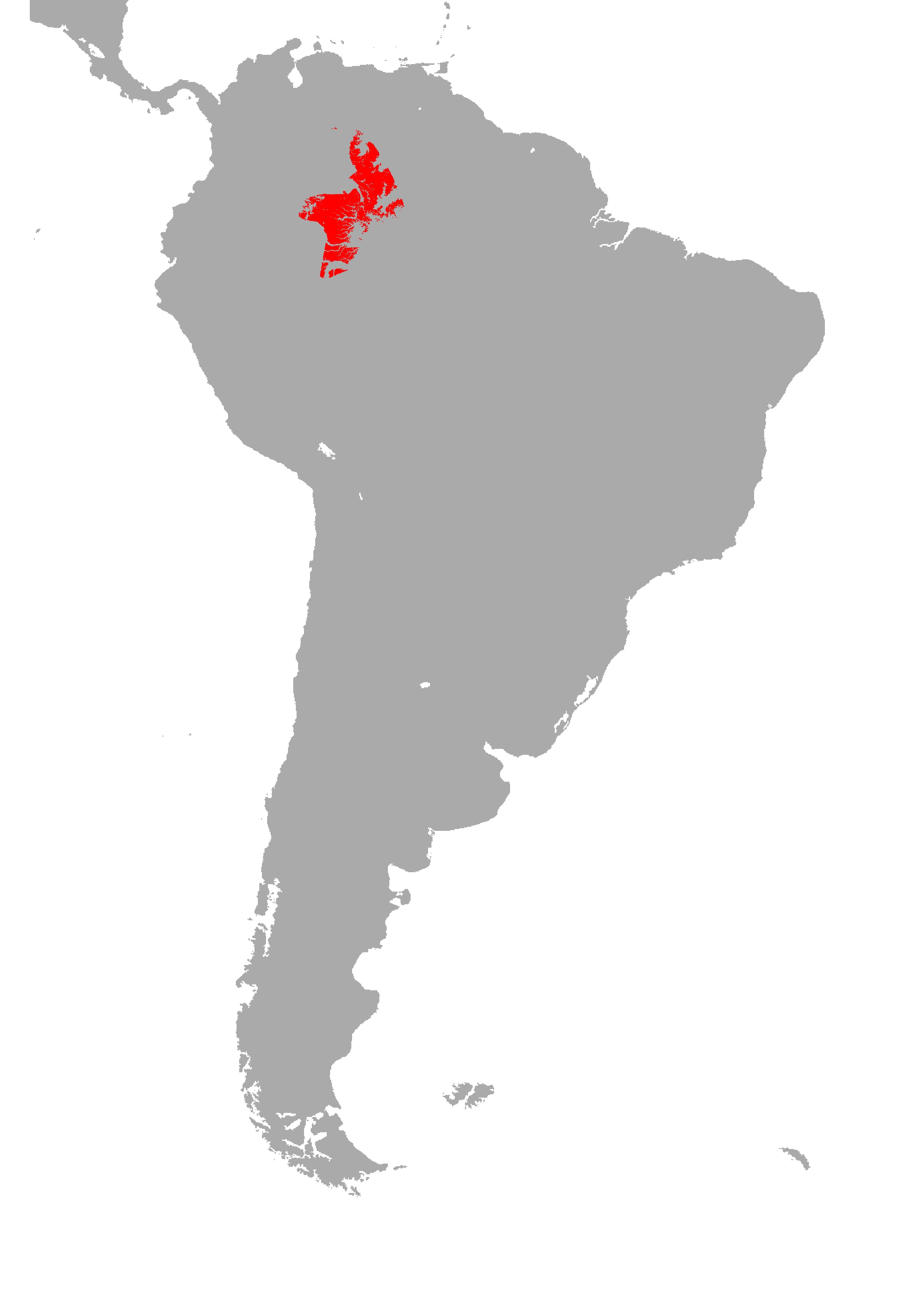

Synonyms
- Micrurus surinamensis nattereri Schmidt, 1952

Species of snake

Micrurus nattereri, also known commonly as Natterer's coral snake and the Venezuelan aquatic coral snake, is a species of venomous snake in the family Elapidae. The species is native to northwestern South America.

== Etymology ==
The specific name, nattereri, is in honor of Austrian naturalist Johann Natterer, a collector of zoological specimens in South America in the nineteenth century.

== Description ==
Large for the genus Micrurus, adults of Micrurus nattereri usually have a total length (tail included) of 60–90 cm (24–35 in), but may exceed one meter (39 in). The color pattern is the same as that of Micrurus surinamensis. However, M. nattereri has a higher number of ventrals: 197–206 in females, 186–193 in males.

== Geographic distribution ==
Micrurus nattereri is found in northwestern Brazil, eastern Colombia, and southern Venezuela. It occurs in the drainages of the Rio Negro and the upper Orinoco River.

== Habitat ==
The preferred natural habitat of Micrurus nattereri is freshwater wetlands and forest near bodies of water, at elevations of 100–200 m (330–660 ft).

== Behavior ==
Micrurus nattereri is both terrestrial and aquatic, the most aquatic species of the New World coral snakes.

== Diet ==
Micrurus nattereri preys upon fishes, especially Synbranchus marmoratus, a species of swamp eel.

== Reproduction ==
Micrurus nattereri is oviparous.
