= Malabar swamp eel =

Conservation status
- Data Deficient (IUCN 3.1)

Scientific classification
- Kingdom: Animalia
- Phylum: Chordata
- Class: Actinopterygii
- Order: Synbranchiformes
- Family: Synbranchidae
- Genus: Rakthamichthys
- Species: R. indicus

Binomial name
- Rakthamichthys indicus (Eapen, 1963)

Synonyms
- Monopterus indicus Eapen, 1963; Monopterus eapeni Talwar, 1991; Rakthamichthys eapeni (Talwar, 1991)

Species of fish

The Malabar swamp eel (Rakthamichthys indicus) (not to be confused with Ophichthys fossorius, also known as the Malabar swampeel) is a species of troglobitic swamp eel endemic to subterranean springs in Kottayam in the Indian state of Kerala.

== Taxonomy ==
It was originally described as Monopterus indicus by K. C. Eapen in 1963, but another fish with the same scientific name, the Bombay swamp eel (formerly also Monopterus indicus, now Ophichthys indicus) had already been described 2 years prior. Due to this causing a homonym the species had to be renamed but due to the lack of specimens, it was tentatively referred to as Monopterus "indicus". It was later redescribed as Monopterus eapeni in 1991. A 2020 study found M. eapeni to form a clade with two other troglobitic species from the Western Ghats and one fossorial species from Northeast India, leading it to be reclassified in the new genus Rakthamichthys, lifting the homonym problem and allowing the original specific epithet of indicus to be revived.

== Status ==
Due to the subterranean nature of this species, very little information is known about it, and it had not been collected from the type locality since 1979 till 2021 March when it was found while cleaning a well at Panthalam, Kerala. Due to this, it is classified as Data Deficient on the IUCN Red List.
