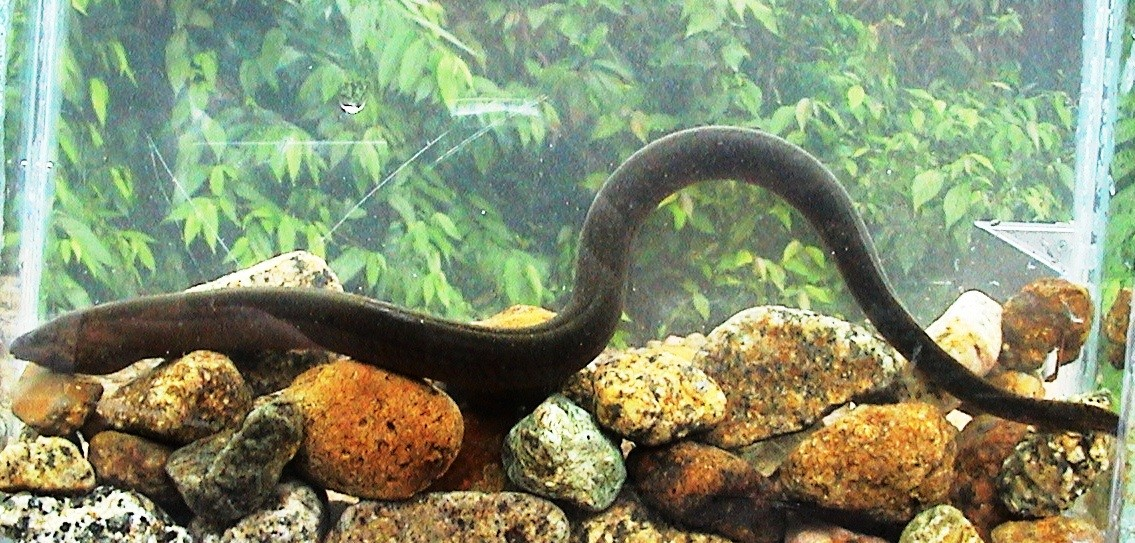
- Synbranchus marmoratus

Scientific classification
- Kingdom: Animalia
- Phylum: Chordata
- Class: Actinopterygii
- Division: Teleostei
- Order: Synbranchiformes
- Family: Synbranchidae
- Subfamily: Synbranchinae; Bonaparte, 1835

= Synbranchinae =

Subfamily of fishes

Synbranchinae is a subfamily of swamp eel, consisting of six of the seven genera in the family Synbranchidae. The remaining genus, the monotypic Macrotrema is the only one in the other subfamily Macrotreminae. The subfamily occurs in the Neotropics, Afrotropics and Asia.

== Genera ==
The following genera are classified in the Synbranchinae:

- Monopterus Lacépède, 1800
- Ophichthys Swainson, 1839
- Rakthamichthys Britz, Dahanukar, Standing, Philip, Kumar & Raghavan, 2020
- Typhlosynbranchus Pellegrin, 1922
- Synbranchus Bloch, 1795
- Ophisternon McClelland, 1844
