= Longtailed sand-eel =

Scientific classification
- Domain: Eukaryota
- Kingdom: Animalia
- Phylum: Chordata
- Class: Actinopterygii
- Order: Anguilliformes
- Family: Ophichthidae
- Genus: Bascanichthys
- Species: B. kirkii

Binomial name
- Bascanichthys kirkii (Günther, 1870)

Synonyms
- Ophichthys kirkii Günther, 1870; Caecula kirki (Günther, 1870)

Species of fish

The Longtailed sand-eel (Bascanichthys kirkii) is an eel in the family Ophichthidae (worm/snake eels). It was described by Albert Günther in 1870, originally under the genus Ophichthys. It is a marine, tropical eel, which is known from Aden to Natal, South Africa, in the western Indian Ocean. Males can reach a maximum total length of 54 centimetres (21 in).
