= Blind swamp eel =

Conservation status
- Endangered (IUCN 3.1)

Scientific classification
- Kingdom: Animalia
- Phylum: Chordata
- Class: Actinopterygii
- Division: Teleostei
- Order: Synbranchiformes
- Family: Synbranchidae
- Genus: Ophisternon
- Species: O. infernale

Binomial name
- Ophisternon infernale (C. L. Hubbs, 1938)

Synonyms
- Pluto infernalis Hubbs, 1938; Furmastix infernalis (Hubbs, 1938); Synbranchus infernalis (Hubbs, 1938)

Species of fish

The blind swamp eel (Ophisternon infernale) is a species of fish in the family Synbranchidae. It is endemic to Mexico where it lives in cave systems and is known in Spanish as the anguila ciega. The International Union for Conservation of Nature has rated this cavefish as "endangered".

== Taxonomy ==
The blind swamp eel was first described by the American ichthyologist Carl Leavitt Hubbs in 1938, the holotype having been collected two years earlier by A.S.Pearse. Hubbs named the fish Pluto infernalis because he liked to associate creatures living underground with the devil, who supposedly dwelt underground, and gave diabolical names to cave fishes; infernale comes from the Latin for Hell. The fish was later transferred to the genus Ophisternon, the swamp eels. The genus name is derived from the Greek, "ophis", meaning a serpent, and "sternon", meaning chest. Synonyms for this species include Furmastix infernalis and Synbranchus infernalis.

== Description ==
The blind swamp eel is an elongated, wormlike fish with no pigment, no scales and no visible eyes. It seems likely that it is derived from the marbled swamp eel (Synbranchus marmoratus) and became adapted for life underground. It grows to a standard length of 32.5 cm (13 in) and the bulbous head bears numerous sensory pores.

== Distribution ==
The blind swamp eel is endemic to the Yucatán Peninsula in Mexico where it inhabits freshwater in sinkholes and limestone caves. It lives in shallow water in the muddy substrate or under stones. It has only been found in 7% of the caves investigated, and where it is found, it coexists with the Mexican blind brotula (Typhliasina pearsei), and often with the catfish Rhamdia guatemalensis.

== Ecology ==
The blind swamp eel feeds on the faeces of bats and swallows and on shrimps. The male swamp eel excavates a mucus-lined burrow in which the eggs are laid, and the male guards the nest.

== Status ==
The chief threats faced by this swamp eel is from pollution from untreated sewage and waste water which may seep into the aquifer, and from human disturbance. The International Union for Conservation of Nature has rated this eel as being an "endangered species". This is on the basis that the area occupied by this species is limited in extent, and the number of individuals is thought to have declined drastically over the last ten years, and is likely to continue doing so, due to a decrease in the quantity and quality of suitable habitat.
