= Siboga snake eel =

Scientific classification
- Kingdom: Animalia
- Phylum: Chordata
- Class: Actinopterygii
- Order: Anguilliformes
- Family: Ophichthidae
- Genus: Bascanichthys
- Species: B. sibogae

Binomial name
- Bascanichthys sibogae (Weber, 1913)

Synonyms
- Callechelys sibogae Weber, 1913

Species of fish

The Siboga snake eel (Bascanichthys sibogae) is an eel from the family Ophichthidae (worm/snake eels). It was described by Max Carl Wilhelm Weber in 1913, originally under the genus Callechelys. It is a marine, tropical eel which is found off the south coast of Timor, Indonesia, in the western central Pacific Ocean. Males can reach a maximum total length of 23.7 centimetres (9.3 in).
