= Rakthamichthys rongsaw =

Scientific classification
- Kingdom: Animalia
- Phylum: Chordata
- Class: Actinopterygii
- Division: Teleostei
- Order: Synbranchiformes
- Family: Synbranchidae
- Genus: Rakthamichthys
- Species: R. rongsaw

Binomial name
- Rakthamichthys rongsaw (Britz, Sykes, Gower & Kamei, 2018)

Synonyms
- Monopterus rongsaw

Species of eel

Rakthamichthys rongsaw is a species of swamp eel discovered in the Khasi Hills in northeast India. The researchers were searching for caecilians, when they uncovered the eel in soil.

== Taxonomy ==
It was formerly classified in the genus Monopterus until a 2020 study found it to group with three other subterranean Monopterus species from the Western Ghats, all of which displayed significant genetic and osteological differences from any other species in Monopterus. Due to this, all species were classified in the new genus Rakthamichthys.

== Description ==
Only one eel has been identified to date, the specimen was approximately 400 mm (16 in) long. The eel is also absent from skin pigmentation and has 92 precaudal and 69 caudal vertebra. The eyes have been described as tiny.
