= Callechelys guineensis =

Scientific classification
- Domain: Eukaryota
- Kingdom: Animalia
- Phylum: Chordata
- Class: Actinopterygii
- Order: Anguilliformes
- Family: Ophichthidae
- Genus: Callechelys
- Species: C. guineensis

Binomial name
- Callechelys guineensis (Osório, 1893)

Synonyms
- Ophichthys guineensis Osório, 1893; Callechelys guiniensis (Osório, 1893); Callechelys perryae Storey, 1939; Caecula pantherina Cadenat, 1956; Callechelys pantherina (Cadenat, 1956)

Species of fish

Callechelys guineensis, the shorttail snake eel, is an eel in the family Ophichthidae (worm/snake eels). It was described by Balthazar Osório in 1893, originally under the genus Ophichthys. It is a marine, tropical eel which is known from the western and eastern Atlantic Ocean, including Florida, USA, Puerto Rico, Venezuela, the Bahamas, Saint Barthélemy, Senegal, Lesser Antilles, and Cape Verde. It dwells at a depth range of 4 to 35 metres (13 to 115 ft), and inhabits the continental shelf, where it forms burrows in sand and mud. Males can reach a maximum total length of 108 centimetres (43 in).
