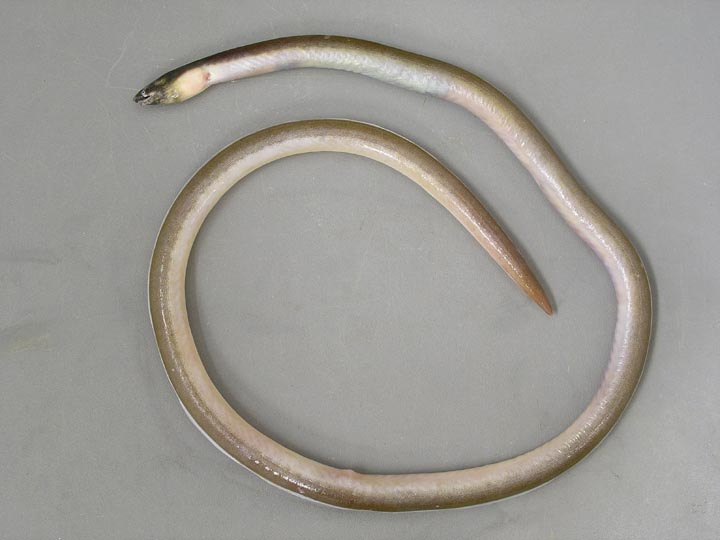
- Bascanichthys bascanium

Scientific classification
- Kingdom: Animalia
- Phylum: Chordata
- Class: Actinopterygii
- Division: Teleostei
- Order: Anguilliformes
- Family: Ophichthidae
- Subfamily: Ophichthinae
- Genus: Bascanichthys; D. S. Jordan and B. M. Davis, 1891

Species
- See text.

= Bascanichthys =

Genus of fishes

Bascanichthys is a genus of eels in the snake eel family Ophichthidae. It currently contains the following species:

- Bascanichthys bascanium (D. S. Jordan, 1884) (Sooty eel)
- Bascanichthys bascanoides R. C. Osburn & Nichols, 1916 (Sooty sand-eel)
- Bascanichthys ceciliae Blache & Cadenat, 1971
- Bascanichthys cylindricus Meek & Hildebrand, 1923 (Round sand-eel)
- Bascanichthys deraniyagalai Menon, 1961 (Indian longtailed sand-eel)
- Bascanichthys fijiensis (Seale, 1935)
- Bascanichthys filaria (Günther, 1872)
- Bascanichthys gaira (Moreno, Acero P. & Grijalba-Bendeck, 2016) (Colombian sand eel)
- Bascanichthys inopinatus McCosker, E. B. Böhlke & J. E. Böhlke, 1989
- Bascanichthys kabeyawan Hibino & Ho, 2022 (Kabeyawan sand eel)
- Bascanichthys kirkii (Günther, 1870) (Longtailed sand-eel)
- Bascanichthys longipinnis (Kner & Steindachner, 1867)
- Bascanichthys myersi (Herre, 1932)
- Bascanichthys panamensis Meek & Hildebrand, 1923 (Panama sand-eel)
- Bascanichthys paulensis Storey, 1939
- Bascanichthys pusillus Seale, 1917
- Bascanichthys ryukyuensis Hibino, Yamashita & Sakurai, 2022 (Vine-like sand eel)
- Bascanichthys scuticaris (Goode & T. H. Bean, 1880) (Whip eel)
- Bascanichthys sibogae (M. C. W. Weber, 1913)
