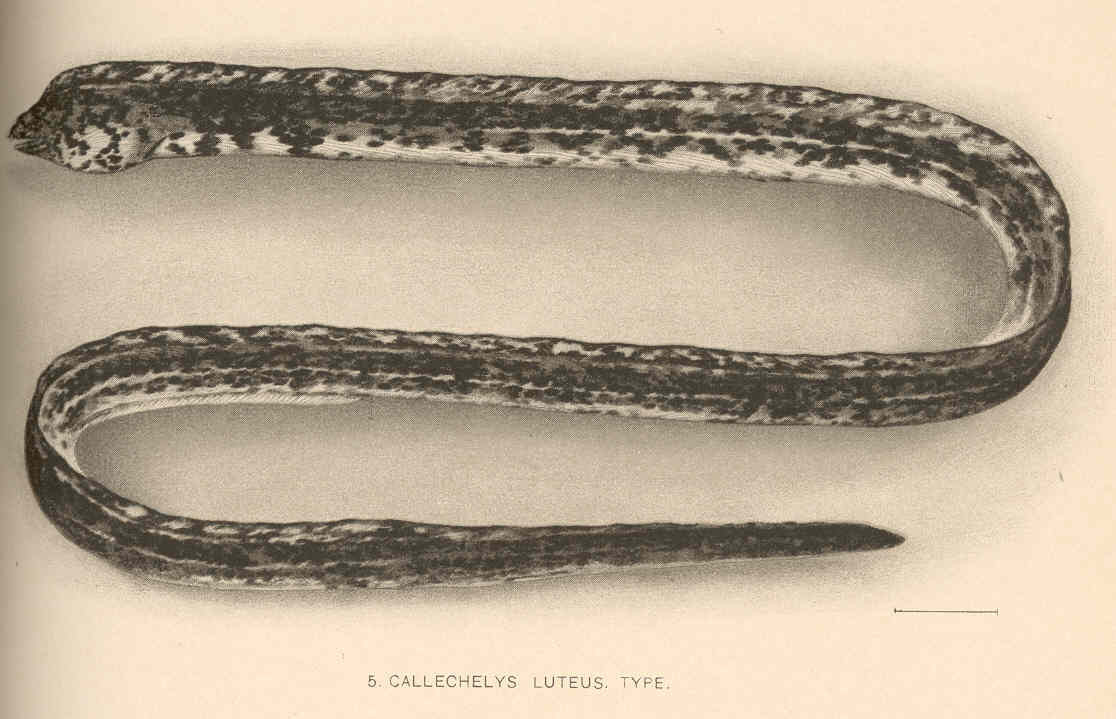

Scientific classification
- Kingdom: Animalia
- Phylum: Chordata
- Class: Actinopterygii
- Division: Teleostei
- Order: Anguilliformes
- Family: Ophichthidae
- Genus: Callechelys
- Species: C. lutea

Binomial name
- Callechelys lutea Snyder, 1904

Synonyms
- Callechelys luteus Snyder, 1904

= Callechelys lutea =

Species of fish

Callechelys lutea, the freckled snake eel or yellow-spotted snake eel, is an eel in the family Ophichthidae (worm/snake eels). It was described by John Otterbein Snyder in 1904.

It is a marine, tropical eel which is known from the Hawaiian Islands, Midway Island, Johnston Atoll, and the French Frigate Shoals, in the Pacific Ocean. It dwells at a depth of 4 to 24 metres (13 to 79 ft), and forms burrows in sand sediments to hunt. Males can reach a maximum total length of 104 centimetres (41 in).

== Description ==
It has dorsal and anal fins, with its dorsal fin extending nearly to the tail, and dorsal fin origin on its nape. Callechelys marmorata is considered a lookalike.
