= Blotched snake eel =

There are two species of eel with the common name of blotched snake eel:

- Callechelys muraena
- Ophichthus erabo
