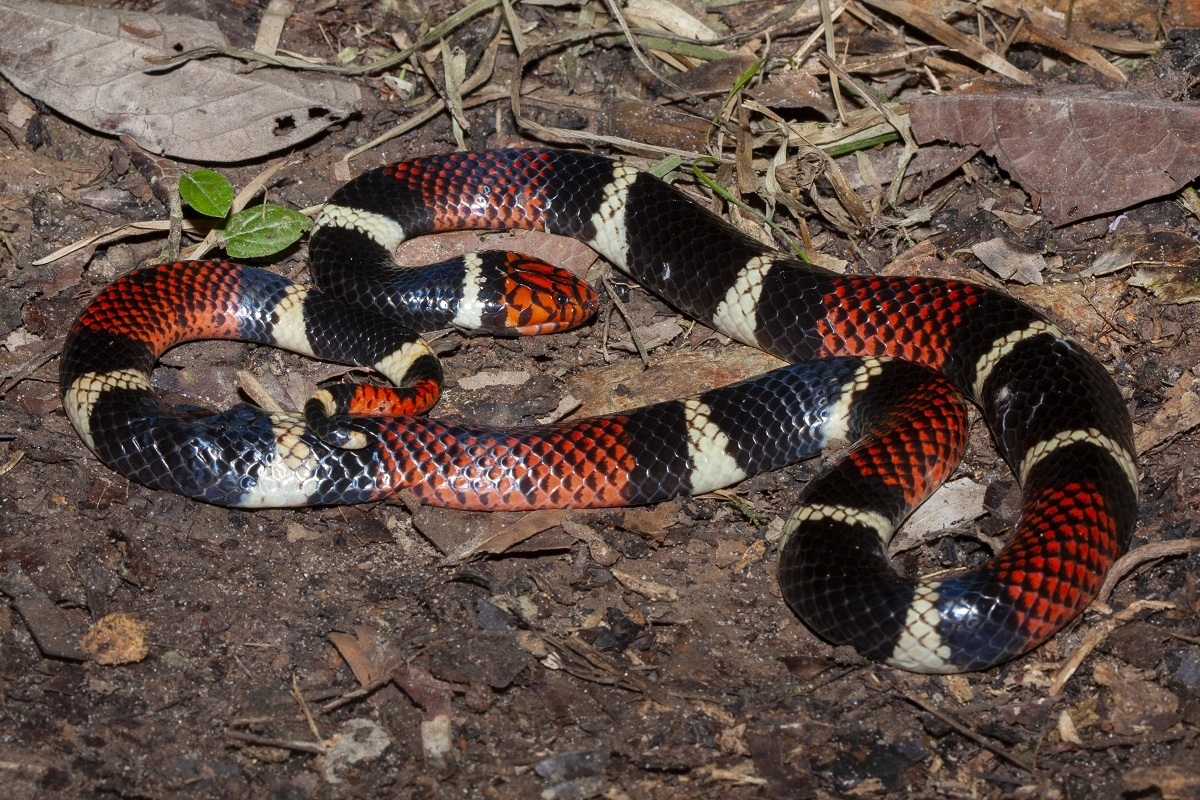
- Micrurus surinamensis
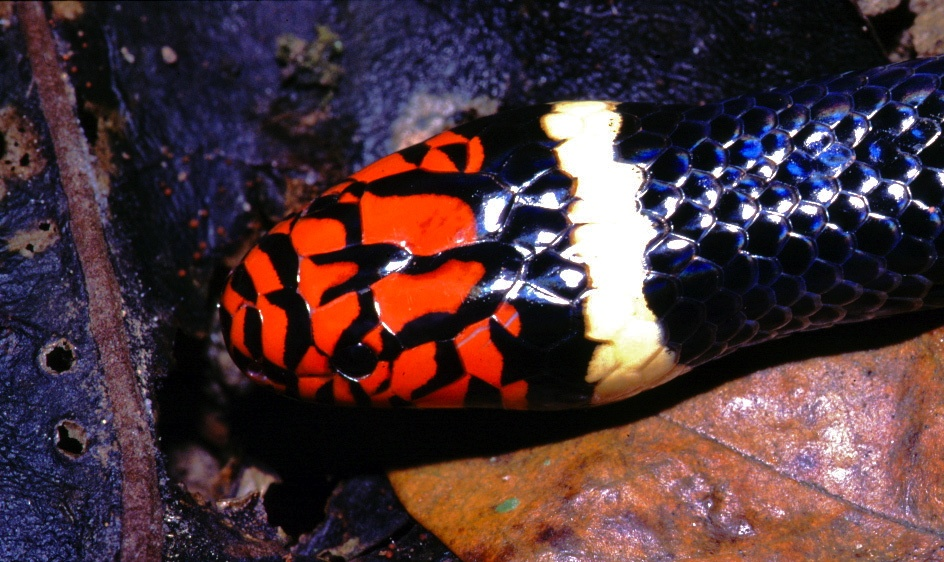
- Closeup of red head, characteristic of species

Conservation status
- Least Concern (IUCN 3.1)

Scientific classification
- Kingdom: Animalia
- Phylum: Chordata
- Class: Reptilia
- Order: Squamata
- Suborder: Serpentes
- Family: Elapidae
- Genus: Micrurus
- Species: M. surinamensis

Binomial name
- Micrurus surinamensis (Cuvier, 1817)
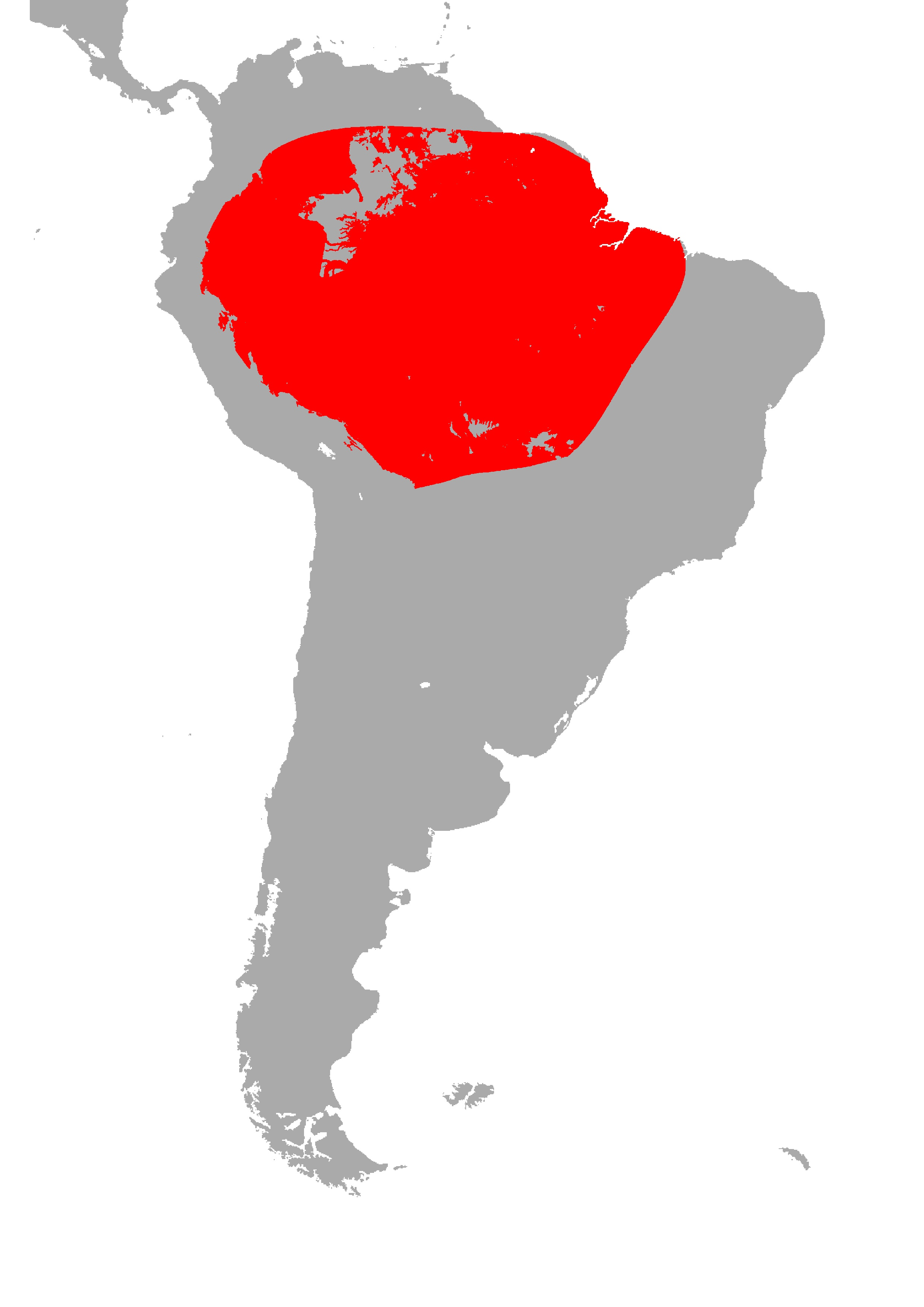

Synonyms
- Elaps surinamensis Cuvier, 1817

= Aquatic coral snake =

Species of snake

The aquatic coral snake (Micrurus surinamensis) is a semiaquatic species of coral snake, a venomous snake in the family Elapidae. The species is native to northern South America.

== Common names ==
Local common names for Micrurus surinamensis include cobra coral, coral de agua, coralillo, coral venenosa, culebra del agua, naca-naca, naca-naca de agua, boichumbeguaçu, himeralli, itinkia, kraalslang, koraalslang, krarasneke, kraka sneki, and wata mio.

== Description ==
Micrurus surinamensis is one of the heaviest and most robust coral snakes. Adults have an average total length (tail included) of 0.8–1.0 m (2.6–3.3 ft), with a maximum verified total length of 1.35 m (4.4 ft), although there are unproven reports of 1.8 m (5.9 ft) specimens.

The species is characterized by the coloration of its head, which is mainly red, with black scale edging. The head is large, with a long snout, and eyes and nostrils located more dorsally than in other coral snakes. The dorsal scales are smooth (non-keeled) and shiny, and arranged in 15 rows. Supra-anal keels are present in males, but little developed. The body has wide red rings that are separated by 5–8 triads. Each triad consists of a wide middle black ring and two narrower outer black rings. The black rings are separated from each other by two narrow cream or yellowish rings.

Males have 156–174 ventrals and 33–38 subcaudals, and large males may have a few supraanal tubercles. Females have 170–187 ventrals and 31–34 subcaudals.

== Behavior ==
The species Micrurus surinamensis is known to have mainly aquatic behavior. It swims very well, and can remain submerged for a long period. It is mainly nocturnal, although it can also be active during the day. It is not aggressive towards humans. When it feels threatened, it flattens its body and raises its tail.

== Reproduction ==
The mode of reproduction of Micrurus surinamensis is by oviparity, but the clutch size has not yet been reported.

== Diet ==
Micrurus surinamensis preys predominately upon swamp eels such as Synbranchus marmoratus, bony fishes such as Callichthys callichthys and Gymnotus carapo, amphibians, and other snakes.

== Geographic distribution ==
Micrurus surinamensis is native to South America, where it is found in Bolivia, Brazil, Colombia, Ecuador, French Guiana, Guyana, Peru, Suriname, and Venezuela. It occurs mainly in the drainages of the Orinoco River and the Amazon rainforest.

== Habitat ==
The preferred natural habitats of Micrurus surinamensis are humid forests with low mountains, and tropical forests along streams, rivers, and bodies of water. It can also be common in humid lowland forest areas at elevations from near sea level to 600 m (2,000 ft).

== Venom ==
Studies on Micrurus toxins are limited due to low venom production. Snakes of the genus Micrurus have a potent neurotoxic venom that causes neuromuscular blockage when competitively binding to acetylcholine receptors. Bites are rare, but the venom of Micrurus surinamensis causes paralysis of the cranial nerves and can be fatal. A well-reported case occurred in the Amazon, where an 18-year-old biology student was bitten on the finger while trying to capture the snake. The victim arrived at the hospital in 20 minutes where he complained of blurred vision, difficulty speaking, swallowing, walking, and opening his eyelids. The victim also had respiratory failure, as well as foam in the nose and mouth. The victim required mechanical ventilation due to severe breathing difficulties, as a result of paralysis of his respiratory muscles from the neuromuscular blocking effects of the venom. The victim received specific Micrurus antivenom, and survived.

The venom of M. surinamensis is weaker than the venoms of smaller species of its genus. The estimated lethal dose of M. surinamensis venom for an adult human is 18–20 mg (dry weight), compared to 4–7 mg for smaller species. However, being a large species, M. surinamensis is capable of carrying a large amount of venom. When "milked" by scientists, the average venom yield was 56 mg, and the maximum venom yield was 160 mg.
