= Bascanichthys paulensis =

Conservation status
- Least Concern (IUCN 3.1)

Scientific classification
- Kingdom: Animalia
- Phylum: Chordata
- Class: Actinopterygii
- Order: Anguilliformes
- Family: Ophichthidae
- Genus: Bascanichthys
- Species: B. paulensis

Binomial name
- Bascanichthys paulensis Storey, 1939

Synonyms
- Bascanichthys congoensis Blache & Cadenat, 1971

Species of fish

Bascanichthys paulensis is an eel in the family Ophichthidae (worm/snake eels). It was described by Margaret Hamilton Storey in 1939. It is a tropical, marine eel which is known from the coast off Sao Paulo, Brazil in the western Atlantic Ocean. There is also a population from Pointe-Noire Bay, Democratic Republic of Congo, (formerly described as B. congoensis) in the eastern Atlantic Ocean. Males can reach a maximum total length of 62.3 centimetres (24.5 in).
