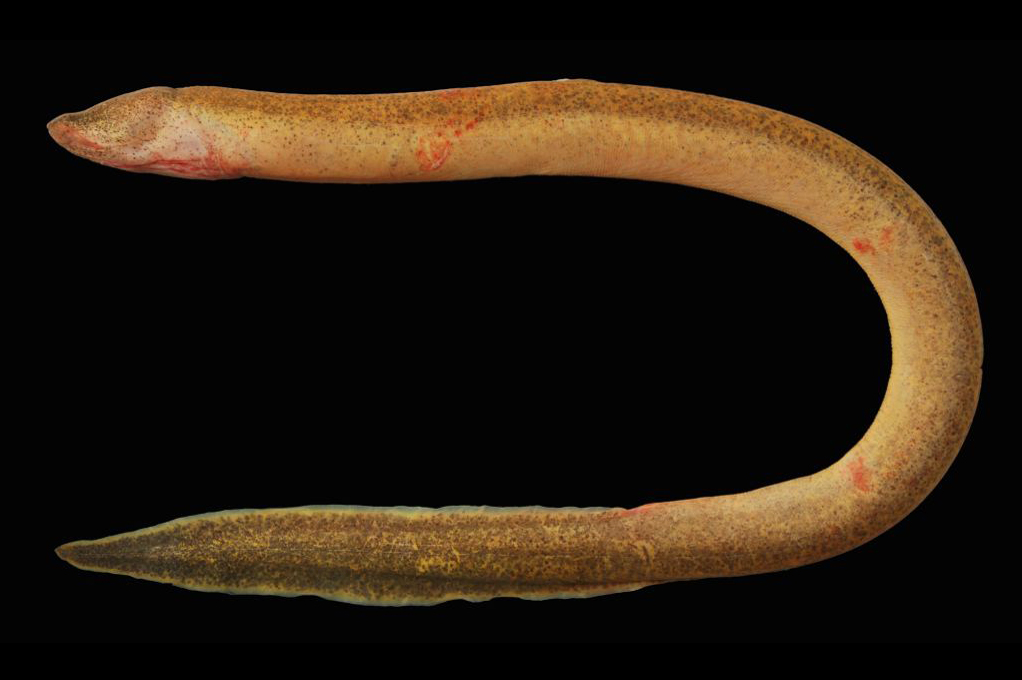

Conservation status
- Least Concern (IUCN 3.1)

Scientific classification
- Kingdom: Animalia
- Phylum: Chordata
- Class: Actinopterygii
- Order: Synbranchiformes
- Family: Synbranchidae
- Genus: Ophisternon
- Species: O. bengalense

Binomial name
- Ophisternon bengalense McClelland, 1844

Synonyms
- Synbranchus bengalensis (McClelland, 1844); Ophisternon hepaticus McClelland, 1844; Tetrabranchus microphthalmus Bleeker, 1851

= Ophisternon bengalense =

Species of fish

Ophisternon bengalense the Bengal eel, Bengal mudeel or onegill eel, is a species of fish in the family Synbranchidae. It is endemic to freshwater and brackish water rivers and swamps in Oceania and South Asia. It is normally 100 cm in maximum length.

== Description ==
Ophisternon bengalense has an eel-like body with a flattened head with a single slit-like gill opening at the bottom of the back of its head and small eyes which can be seen through its skin. The dorsal and anal fins are reduced and form folds of skin on the rear half of the body, the pectoral and pelvic fins are absent. It can grow to 55 centimetres (22 in) but is more usually 20 centimetres (7.9 in). The colour is blackish-green to rufous with a purplish tinge and dark spots.

== Distribution ==
Ophisternon bengalense is recorded from South Asian countries like India, Bangladesh and Sri Lanka to south-eastern Asia, Indonesia, Philippines and New Guinea. The fish may also found in Australia and Palau islands.

== Biology and habitat ==
Ophisternon bengalense has an almost unknown biology. It is thought likely to be a protogynous hermaphrodite which lays eggs in a tunnel excavated into the soft substrate. The males excavate and guard the nesting burrow. The adults may be found in both fresh and brackish waters along rivers and in swamps, frequently close to the river mouth. They are normally recorded among thick vegetation in muddy, still water bodies, such as lagoons, swamps, canals and rice fields.

== Fisheries ==
Ophisternon bengalense is of minor interest to fisheries and is eaten. It is normally sold and eaten fresh.

== Sources ==
- http://biodiversityofsrilanka.blogspot.com/p/freshwater-fish-diversity-of-sri-lanka_29.html
