= Callechelys cliffi =

Scientific classification
- Domain: Eukaryota
- Kingdom: Animalia
- Phylum: Chordata
- Class: Actinopterygii
- Order: Anguilliformes
- Family: Ophichthidae
- Genus: Callechelys
- Species: C. cliffi

Binomial name
- Callechelys cliffi J. E. Böhlke & Briggs, 1954

Species of fish

Callechelys cliffi, the sandy ridgefin eel, is an eel in the family Ophichthidae (worm/snake eels). It was described by James Erwin Böhlke and John Carmon Briggs in 1954. It is a marine, tropical eel which is known from the eastern central Pacific Ocean, including Mexico and Panama. It dwells at a depth range of 0 to 30 metres (0 to 98 ft), and inhabits sand sediments. Males can reach a maximum standard length of 45.5 centimetres (17.9 in).

The species epithet "cliffi" refers to Frank S. Cliff. Due to there being an extremely limited number of known specimens, and thereby a lack of information on the species' distribution and population, threats and habitat requirements, the IUCN redlist currently lists the Sandy ridgefin eel as Data Deficient.
