= Sooty sand-eel =

Conservation status
- Least Concern (IUCN 3.1)

Scientific classification
- Kingdom: Animalia
- Phylum: Chordata
- Class: Actinopterygii
- Order: Anguilliformes
- Family: Ophichthidae
- Genus: Bascanichthys
- Species: B. bascanoides

Binomial name
- Bascanichthys bascanoides R. C. Osburn & Nichols, 1916

Species of fish

The Sooty sand-eel (Bascanichthys bascanoides) is an eel in the family Ophichthidae (worm/snake eels). It was described by Raymond Carroll Osburn and John Treadwell Nichols in 1916. It is a marine, tropical eel which is known from the eastern central Pacific Ocean, including Costa Rica and Mexico. It is known to dwell at a maximum depth of 20 metres (66 ft), and inhabits sand sediments. Males can reach a maximum total length of 77 centimetres (30 in).

Due to a lack of known major threats to the species, the IUCN redlist currently lists the Sooty sand-eel as Least Concern.
