= Bombay swamp eel =

Conservation status
- Vulnerable (IUCN 3.1)

Scientific classification
- Kingdom: Animalia
- Phylum: Chordata
- Class: Actinopterygii
- Order: Synbranchiformes
- Family: Synbranchidae
- Genus: Ophichthys
- Species: O. indicus

Binomial name
- Ophichthys indicus (Silas & E. Dawson, 1961)

Synonyms
- Amphipnous indicus Silas & Dawson, 1961; Monopterus indicus

Species of fish

The Bombay swamp eel (Ophichthys indicus), also known as the paytop in Marathi, is a species of fish in the family Synbranchidae. It is endemic to the state of Maharashtra in India.

== Taxonomy ==
It was at first classified in the genus Amphipnous, but it was later moved to Monopterus. However a 2020 study found it to form a distinct clade with about 4 other species also previously classified in Monopterus, and the genus Ophichthys was thus revived to contain them.

== Distribution ==
This species is thought to be endemic to the northern Western Ghats of India, in the state of Maharashtra. It is currently known from 5-10 localities: Robber's Cave and Dhobi Falls in Mahabaleshwar, Kanheri Falls near Kanheri Caves in Mumbai, and the Tamhini and Tail Baila areas in Pune. However, it is thought to occur in other localities as well.

== Habitat ==
The species inhabits swamps and marshy areas associated with hill streams. During the early part of the monsoon season, adult individuals migrate upstream to breed. Inside caves, O. indicus is known to hide inside piles of bat guano. In the Sahyadri Tiger Reserve, this species is known from small rock-filled puddles that dot the lateritic plateaus such as the Kargaon plateau during the monsoon season. It can also survive in less conventional habitats; in 2012, while workers were cleaning a biogas plant in Pune, a live O. indicus was found in a heap of cow dung even though the plant had been closed for over 8 years at that point, and had almost no water.

== Behavior ==
They are nocturnal and during the daytime, they stay buried underneath boulders or hang to tree roots along the edges of streams. They are obligate air breathers and prefer to float on the surface of the water to breathe, then dive for 3-5 minutes before returning to the surface. They primarily feed on earthworms by creating a vacuum with their mouths and sucking them in. In an example of Batesian mimicry, if an O. indicus is threatened, it can bare its fangs in a way similar to a snake. They can also burrow into the mud and use a mucus secreted from their body to fully retract inside if a threat is detected.

== Status ==
O. indicus is considered Vulnerable on the IUCN Red List. Habitat alterations caused by urbanization, deforestation, and recreational activities on the mountain tops are common in the northern Western Ghats, and can severely affect the fish. Until the 1980s, the species was abundant in the Satara district, but since then there have been no sightings until an individual was found in a closed-down biogas plant in 2012. A 2019 study found the species to be on the verge of extinction, primarily due to roadkills; during the monsoon season, aggregations of O. indicus can form that crawl over the road, making them at risk from oncoming vehicles; this has been implicated in the species being extirpated from some areas such as Lonavala and Tamhini Ghat. Plateau habitats are prime targets for wind farms and deforestation, which can destroy critical habitat. Other plateau populations are affected by blasting to make way for plantations, quarrying for laterite rock, use of plateaus for residential purposes, and use as a dumping site for city waste. Populations can survive on agricultural land, but they are at risk of being affected by fertilizer runoff, and are often mistaken for snakes and killed. Factories also release large amounts of effluent into their habitat. Climate change also affects the species by leading to reduced and/or increasingly erratic rainfall patterns. Major conservation actions will be required to save the species from extinction.
