= Bascanichthys filaria =

Scientific classification
- Domain: Eukaryota
- Kingdom: Animalia
- Phylum: Chordata
- Class: Actinopterygii
- Order: Anguilliformes
- Family: Ophichthidae
- Genus: Bascanichthys
- Species: B. filaria

Binomial name
- Bascanichthys filaria (Günther, 1872)

Synonyms
- Ophichthys filaria Günther, 1872

Species of fish

Bascanichthys filaria is an eel in the family Ophichthidae (worm/snake eels). It was described by Albert Günther in 1872. It is a tropical, marine eel which is known from Irian Jaya, Indonesia, in the western central Pacific Ocean.
