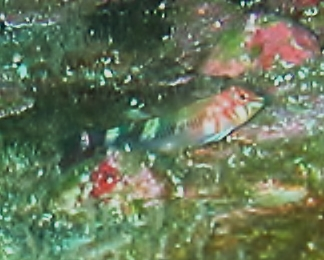

Conservation status
- Vulnerable (IUCN 3.1)

Scientific classification
- Kingdom: Animalia
- Phylum: Chordata
- Class: Actinopterygii
- Order: Blenniiformes
- Family: Tripterygiidae
- Genus: Axoclinus
- Species: A. cocoensis

Binomial name
- Axoclinus cocoensis W. A. Bussing, 1991

= Axoclinus cocoensis =

Species of fish

Axoclinus cocoensis, known commonly as the Cocos triplefin, is a species of triplefin blenny. It is found only on shallow reefs around Cocos Island in the eastern Pacific Ocean, part of Costa Rica.
