= Axoclinus nigricaudus =

Conservation status
- Least Concern (IUCN 3.1)

Scientific classification
- Kingdom: Animalia
- Phylum: Chordata
- Class: Actinopterygii
- Order: Blenniiformes
- Family: Tripterygiidae
- Genus: Axoclinus
- Species: A. nigricaudus

Binomial name
- Axoclinus nigricaudus Allen & Robertson, 1991

Species of fish

Axoclinus nigricaudus, known commonly as the Cortez triplefin, is a species of triplefin blenny. It occurs in the eastern Pacific in the western and north-eastern Gulf of California.
