= Axoclinus storeyae =

Conservation status
- Least Concern (IUCN 3.1)

Scientific classification
- Kingdom: Animalia
- Phylum: Chordata
- Class: Actinopterygii
- Order: Blenniiformes
- Family: Tripterygiidae
- Genus: Axoclinus
- Species: A. storeyae

Binomial name
- Axoclinus storeyae Brock, 1940

Synonyms
- Enneapterygius storeyae Brock, 1940

Species of fish

Axoclinus storeyae is a species of triplefin blenny which is found in Mexican waters in the Gulf of California where it is associated with reefs, living among rocks and boulders with thick growths of algae in shallow water. The specific name honours the American herpetologist, ichthyologist and museum curator Margaret Hamilton Storey (1900-1960) who worked at the Stanford University Natural History Museum.
