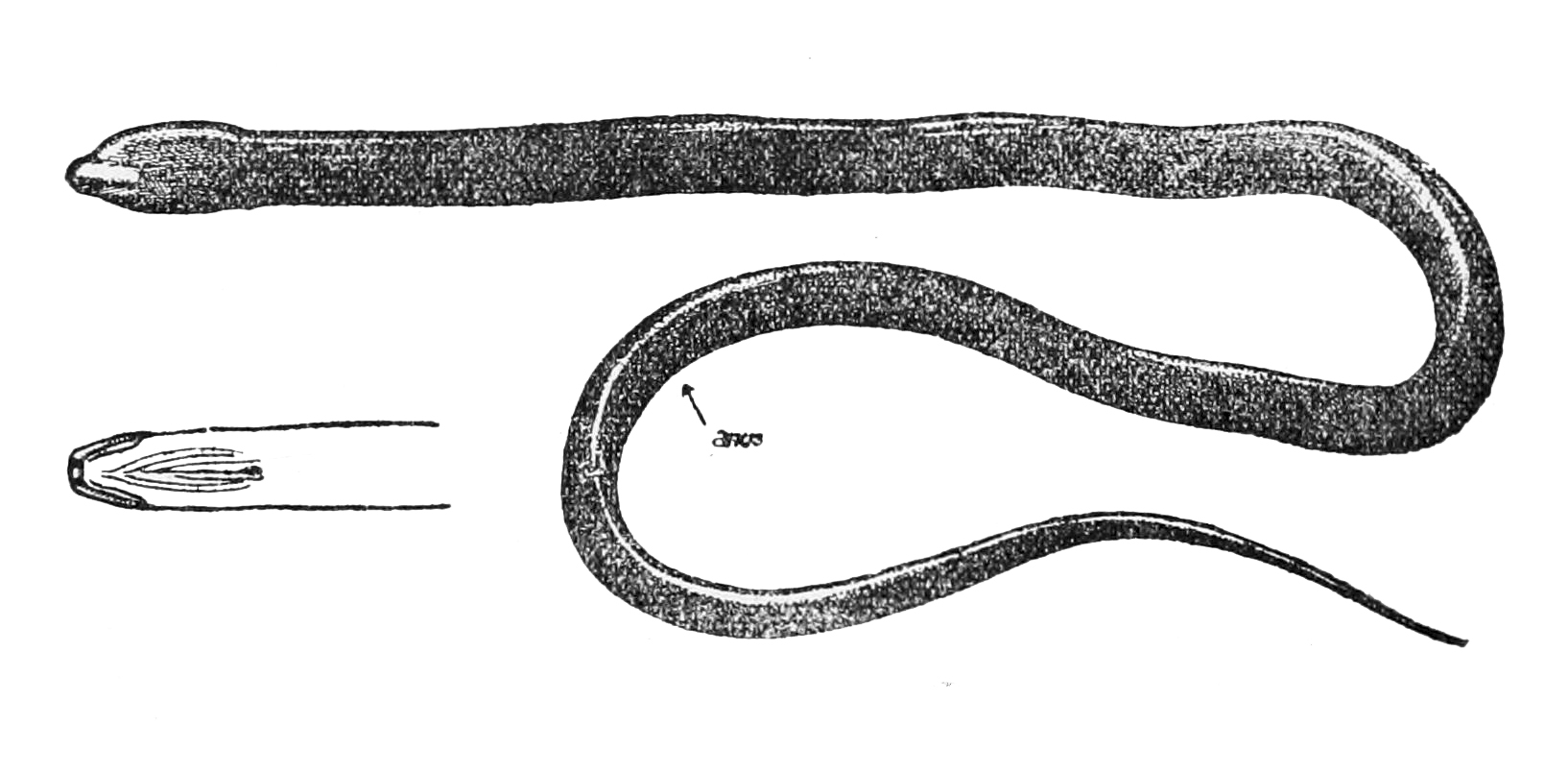
- Liberian swamp eel (T. boueti)

Scientific classification
- Kingdom: Animalia
- Phylum: Chordata
- Class: Actinopterygii
- Order: Synbranchiformes
- Family: Synbranchidae
- Subfamily: Synbranchinae
- Genus: Typhlosynbranchus; Pellegrin, 1922

Type species
- Typhlosynbranchus boueti Pellegrin, 1922

Species
- T. boueti T. luticolus

= Typhlosynbranchus =

Genus of fish

Typhlosynbranchus is a genus of swamp eels that are native to West and Central Africa. It contains two species that were formerly classified in the primarily Asian genus Monopterus.

== Taxonomy ==
The genus was originally formed by Jacques Pellegrin in 1922 for the Liberian swamp eel, but later studies synonymized it with Monopterus. However, a 2020 study found significant divergence between the two taxa and revived the genus for M. boueti and the recently described M. luticolus.

== Species ==
One of the two species, T. boueti, is primarily found in aquatic environments, while the other (T. luticolus) has a fossorial lifestyle in inundated soil.

- Typhlosynbranchus boueti (Pellegrin, 1922) (Liberian swamp eel)
- Typhlosynbranchus luticolus Britz, Doherty-Bone, Kouete, D. Sykes & Gower, 2016
