= Callechelys maculatus =

Scientific classification
- Domain: Eukaryota
- Kingdom: Animalia
- Phylum: Chordata
- Class: Actinopterygii
- Order: Anguilliformes
- Family: Ophichthidae
- Genus: Callechelys
- Species: C. maculatus

Binomial name
- Callechelys maculatus Y. T. Chu, H. L. Wu & X. B. Jin, 1981

Species of fish

Callechelys maculatus is an eel in the family Ophichthidae (worm/snake eels). It was described by Chu Yuan-Ting, Wu Han-Lin and Jin Xin-Bo in 1981. It is a marine, temperate water-dwelling eel which is known from Pingtan Island, China, in the northwestern Pacific Ocean. Males can reach a maximum total length of 33.8 centimetres.
