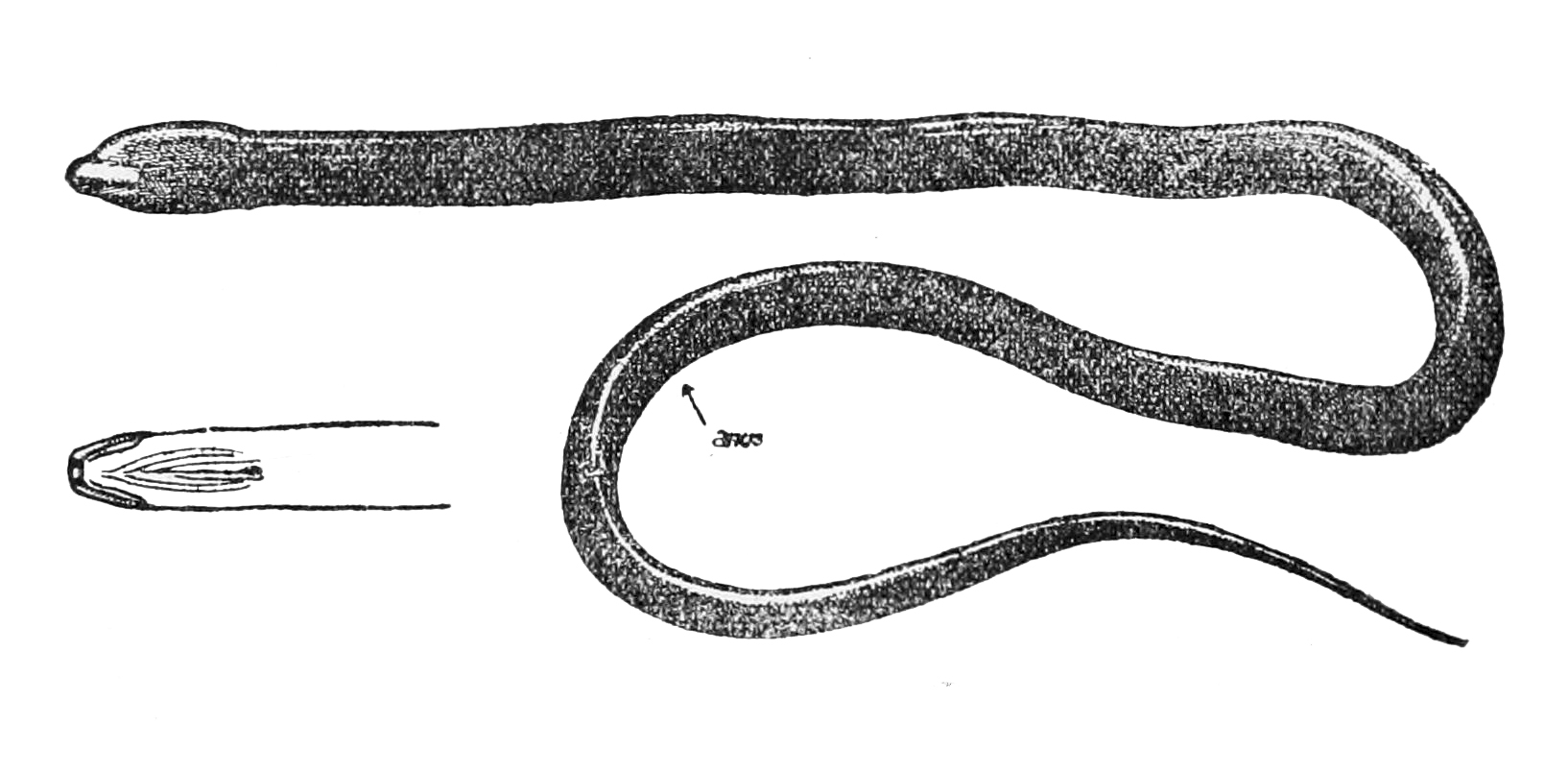

Conservation status
- Data Deficient (IUCN 3.1)

Scientific classification
- Kingdom: Animalia
- Phylum: Chordata
- Class: Actinopterygii
- Order: Synbranchiformes
- Family: Synbranchidae
- Genus: Typhlosynbranchus
- Species: T. boueti

Binomial name
- Typhlosynbranchus boueti Pellegrin, 1922

Synonyms
- Monopterus boueti

= Liberian swamp eel =

Species of fish

The Liberian swamp eel (Typhlosynbranchus boueti) is a species of fish in the family Synbranchidae. It is indigenous to Liberia. It has also been found in Sierra Leone, with an unconfirmed report from Côte d'Ivoire. It was first described by Jacques Pellegrin in 1922 as Typhlosynbranchus boueti, but was later moved to Monopterus. However, a 2020 study revived Typhlosynbranchus. Due to the deficiency in data, the species has not been classified with respect to endangerment.

== Description ==
Liberian swamp eels, like other eels, have an elongated, naked, cylindrical body. The body of the eel tapers to a point and can be described as whip-like. They grow to be at most 34.00 centimetres (13.39 in) in length, with the caudal portion (tail end) of the body being approximately 1/3 of the overall length of the body. The eyes are atrophied and set deep under the skin making them difficult to discern. The teeth are conical and found affixed to the jaw and palate. The gills of the fish open only slightly and are ovate in shape. It has four branchiostegal rays which support the gills. It has 140-44 abdominal vertebrae and 39-45 caudal vertebrae, totaling between 179 and 189.

== Ecology ==
The Liberian swamp eel lives in a tropical, demersal, freshwater environment. They have been primary found in Liberia near Monrovia, in a freshwater rivulet normally about two to three km from the sea.

While they do not prefer to take shelter in caverns, they are found to make burrows in the mud. These burrows are never found far from the sea. The male of the species is responsible for the construction and guarding of the burrow.

They are not known to be a threat to humans, nor are they a target of fishing.

== Etymology ==
The specific name honours the French Charge d'Affaires in Liberia, where the type was collected, Georges Théodore Louis Bouët (1869-1957) who was also a physician in the French Army, a colonial administrator and a naturalist and who sent Zoological specimens to the Muséum national d'Histoire naturelle in Paris.
