= Bascanichthys ceciliae =

Conservation status
- Least Concern (IUCN 3.1)

Scientific classification
- Kingdom: Animalia
- Phylum: Chordata
- Class: Actinopterygii
- Order: Anguilliformes
- Family: Ophichthidae
- Genus: Bascanichthys
- Species: B. ceciliae

Binomial name
- Bascanichthys ceciliae Blache & Cadenat, 1971

Species of fish

Bascanichthys ceciliae is an eel in the family Ophichthidae (worm/snake eels). It was described by Jacques Blache and Jean Cadenat in 1971. It is a tropical, marine eel which is known from the eastern coastal Atlantic Ocean between Senegal and Angola. It inhabits shallow waters where it burrows in sand; the burrows are sometimes exposed during low tide. It can reach a maximum total length of 82.5 centimetres, but more commonly reaches a TL of 60 cm.
