= Whip eel =

Scientific classification
- Kingdom: Animalia
- Phylum: Chordata
- Class: Actinopterygii
- Division: Teleostei
- Order: Anguilliformes
- Family: Ophichthidae
- Genus: Bascanichthys
- Species: B. scuticaris

Binomial name
- Bascanichthys scuticaris (Goode & Bean, 1880)

Synonyms
- Sphagebranchus scuticaris Goode & Bean, 1880; Sphagebranchus teres Goode & Bean, 1882

Species of fish

The whip eel (Bascanichthys scuticaris is an eel in the family Ophichthidae (worm/snake eels). It was described by George Brown Goode and Tarleton Hoffman Bean in 1880. It is a marine, subtropical eel which is known from the western Atlantic Ocean, including the United States and the Gulf of Mexico. It inhabits reefs and coastal waters. Males can reach a maximum total length of 76 centimetres (30 in). Whip eels are very similar in appearance to sooty eels (which are also found throughout the Gulf of Mexico), but whip eels can be distinguished by a row of small pale spots running along the lateral line.
