= Callechelys eristigma =

Scientific classification
- Kingdom: Animalia
- Phylum: Chordata
- Class: Actinopterygii
- Order: Anguilliformes
- Family: Ophichthidae
- Genus: Callechelys
- Species: C. eristigma

Binomial name
- Callechelys eristigma McCosker & Rosenblatt, 1972

Synonyms
- Callechelys eristigmus McCosker & Rosenblatt, 1972

Species of fish

Callechelys eristigma, the spotted ridgefin eel, is an eel in the family Ophichthidae (worm/snake eels). It was described by John E. McCosker and Richard Heinrich Rosenblatt in 1972. It is a marine, tropical eel which is known from the eastern central Pacific Ocean, including Costa Rica, Mexico, and Panama. It dwells at a depth range of 5 to 25 metres (16 to 82 ft), and inhabits benthic sediments of rock and sand. Males can reach a maximum standard length of 113 centimetres (44 in).

The IUCN redlist currently lists the spotted ridgefin eel as Least Concern, in spite of its limited distribution, due to a lack of known threats or observed population decline.
