= Bascanichthys inopinatus =

Conservation status
- Data Deficient (IUCN 3.1)

Scientific classification
- Kingdom: Animalia
- Phylum: Chordata
- Class: Actinopterygii
- Order: Anguilliformes
- Family: Ophichthidae
- Genus: Bascanichthys
- Species: B. inopinatus

Binomial name
- Bascanichthys inopinatus McCosker, Böhlke & Böhlke, 1989

Species of fish

Bascanichthys inopinatus, the unexpected snake eel, is an eel in the family Ophichthidae (worm/snake eels). It was described by John E. McCosker, Eugenia Brandt Böhlke, and James Erwin Böhlke in 1989. It is a tropical, marine eel endemic to the coastal marine waters of Puerto Rico.
