= Callechelys galapagensis =

Conservation status
- Data Deficient (IUCN 3.1)

Scientific classification
- Kingdom: Animalia
- Phylum: Chordata
- Class: Actinopterygii
- Order: Anguilliformes
- Family: Ophichthidae
- Genus: Callechelys
- Species: C. galapagensis

Binomial name
- Callechelys galapagensis McCosker & Rosenblatt, 1972

Species of fish

Callechelys galapagensis, the Galapagos ridgefin eel, is an eel in the family Ophichthidae (worm/snake eels). It was described by John E. McCosker and Richard Heinrich Rosenblatt in 1972. It is a tropical, marine eel which is known from four specimens collected from the Galapagos Islands (from which its species epithet and common name are derived), in the southeastern Pacific Ocean. It inhabits coral, sand and rock.

The IUCN redlist currently lists the Galapagos ridgefin eel as Data Deficient due to its being only known from the original four specimens.
