= Bascanichthys fijiensis =

Scientific classification
- Kingdom: Animalia
- Phylum: Chordata
- Class: Actinopterygii
- Order: Anguilliformes
- Family: Ophichthidae
- Genus: Bascanichthys
- Species: B. fijiensis

Binomial name
- Bascanichthys fijiensis (Seale, 1935)

Synonyms
- Callechelys fijiensis Seale, 1935

Species of fish

Bascanichthys fijiensis is an eel in the family Ophichthidae (worm/snake eels). It was described by Alvin Seale in 1935. It is a tropical, marine eel which is known from Fiji (from which its species epithet is derived), in the western central Pacific Ocean.
