= Bascanichthys pusillus =

Scientific classification
- Kingdom: Animalia
- Phylum: Chordata
- Class: Actinopterygii
- Order: Anguilliformes
- Family: Ophichthidae
- Genus: Bascanichthys
- Species: B. pusillus

Binomial name
- Bascanichthys pusillus Seale, 1917

Species of fish

Bascanichthys pusillus is an eel in the family Ophichthidae (worm/snake eels). It was described by Alvin Seale in 1917. It is a tropical, marine eel which is known from the western central Pacific Ocean.
