= Rakthamichthys =

Scientific classification
- Kingdom: Animalia
- Phylum: Chordata
- Class: Actinopterygii
- Division: Teleostei
- Order: Synbranchiformes
- Family: Synbranchidae
- Subfamily: Synbranchinae
- Genus: Rakthamichthys; Britz, Dahanukar, Standing, Philip, Kumar & Raghavan, 2020

Type species
- Monopterus roseni R. M. Bailey & Gans, 1998

Species
- See text

Genus of fishes

Rakthamichthys is a genus of swamp eels that are endemic to India. Three species are known from the Western Ghats and one is known from Northeast India.

All species live underground, with one species (R. rongsaw) having a fossorial lifestyle and five species (R. anchi, R. digressus, R. indicus, R. mumba, and R. roseni) being troglobitic in nature. All species display adaptations to this lifestyle, including a bright red coloration and highly reduced eyes.

== Taxonomy ==
All four species were formerly classified in the genus Monopterus until a 2020 study found significant genetic and osteological differences between them and the rest of Monopterus, including unique and highly divergent characteristics in the gill arch skeleton. This led to the species being classified in a new genus Rakthamichthys, with "raktham" meaning "blood-red" in Malayalam, as a reference to their distinctive coloration.

== Species ==
- Rakthamichthys anchi (Britz, Pinion, Marak, Velentina & Lokeshwor, 2026)
- Rakthamichthys digressus (K. C. Gopi, 2002) (blind eel)
- Rakthamichthys indicus (Eapen, 1963) (Malabar blind swamp eel) (=Monopterus eapeni Talwar, 1991)
- Rakthamichthys mumba (Jayasimhan, Thackeray, Mohapatra & Kumar, 2021)
- Rakthamichthys rongsaw (Britz, D. Sykes, Gower, & Kamei, 2018)
- Rakthamichthys roseni (R. M. Bailey & Gans, 1998)
