= Indian longtailed sand-eel =

Scientific classification
- Domain: Eukaryota
- Kingdom: Animalia
- Phylum: Chordata
- Class: Actinopterygii
- Order: Anguilliformes
- Family: Ophichthidae
- Genus: Bascanichthys
- Species: B. deraniyagalai

Binomial name
- Bascanichthys deraniyagalai Menon, 1961

Species of fish

The Indian longtailed sand-eel (Bascanichthys deraniyagalai) is an eel in the family Ophichthidae (worm/snake eels). It was described by Ambat Gopalan Kutty Menon in 1961. It is a marine, tropical eel which is known from the Pacific and Indian Ocean, including India and Sri Lanka. It inhabits river mouths and lagoons. Males can reach a maximum total length of 60 centimetres (24 in).

The Indian longtailed sand-eel is of no commercial interest to fisheries.
