= Callechelys leucoptera =

Conservation status
- Least Concern (IUCN 3.1)

Scientific classification
- Kingdom: Animalia
- Phylum: Chordata
- Class: Actinopterygii
- Order: Anguilliformes
- Family: Ophichthidae
- Genus: Callechelys
- Species: C. leucoptera

Binomial name
- Callechelys leucoptera (Cadenat, 1954)

Synonyms
- Caecula leucoptera Cadenat, 1954

Species of fish

Callechelys leucoptera is an eel in the family Ophichthidae (worm/snake eels). It was described by Jean Cadenat in 1954. It is a tropical, marine eel which is known from the eastern Atlantic Ocean, including Senegal to Côte d'Ivoire. It is known to dwell at a depth of 45 metres. It inhabits shallow waters where it forms burrows in the sand, which are sometimes exposed during low tide. Males can reach a maximum total length of 73 centimetres, but more commonly reach a TL of 50 centimetres.

Callechelys leucoptera is preyed upon by the African wedgefish (Rhynchobatus luebberti) and the white grouper (Epinephelus aeneus).
