= Sphaerodactylus storeyae =

Conservation status
- Endangered (IUCN 3.1)

Scientific classification
- Kingdom: Animalia
- Phylum: Chordata
- Class: Reptilia
- Order: Squamata
- Suborder: Gekkota
- Family: Sphaerodactylidae
- Genus: Sphaerodactylus
- Species: S. storeyae

Binomial name
- Sphaerodactylus storeyae Grant, 1944

Synonyms
- Sphaerodactylus storeyae Grant, 1944; Sphaerodactylus oliveri storeyae — Schwartz, 1961; Sphaerodactylus storeyae — Hedges & Garrido, 1993; Sphaerodactylus oliveri storeyae — Rösler, 2000

Species of lizard

Sphaerodactylus storeyae, also known commonly as the Isle of Pines sphaero or the Los Canarreos geckolet, is a small species of gecko, a lizard in the family Sphaerodactylidae. The species is endemic to Isla de la Juventud in Cuba.

== Etymology ==
The specific name, storeyae, is in honor of American herpetologist Margaret Hamilton Storey.

== Habitat ==
The preferred habitats of S. storeyae are forest and shrubland.

== Reproduction ==
S. storeyae is oviparous.
