= Round sand-eel =

round sand-eel

Conservation status
- Least Concern (IUCN 3.1)

Scientific classification
- Domain: Eukaryota
- Kingdom: Animalia
- Phylum: Chordata
- Class: Actinopterygii
- Order: Anguilliformes
- Family: Ophichthidae
- Genus: Bascanichthys
- Species: B. cylindricus

Binomial name
- Bascanichthys cylindricus Meek & Hildebrand, 1923

Species of fish

The Round sand-eel (Bascanichthys cylindricus) is an eel in the family Ophichthidae (worm/snake eels). It was described by Seth Eugene Meek and Samuel Frederick Hildebrand in 1923. It reaches a maximum length of around 88 cm. It is distributed throughout the Eastern Central Pacific; inhabiting shallow, sandy bottoms.
