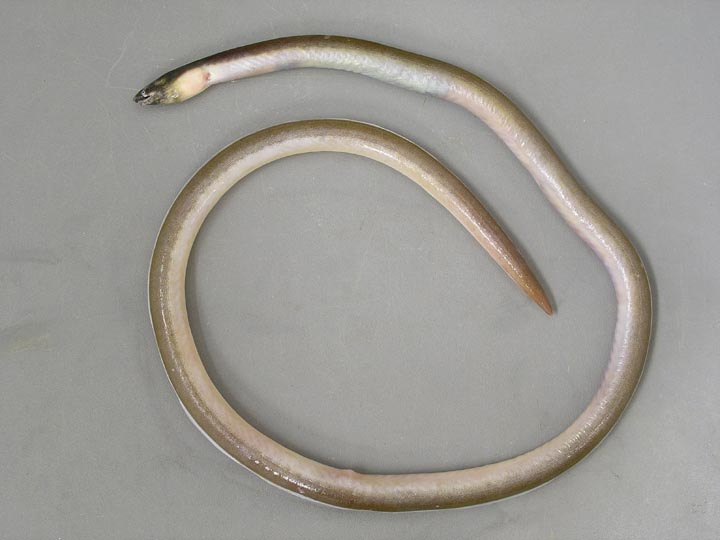

Scientific classification
- Kingdom: Animalia
- Phylum: Chordata
- Class: Actinopterygii
- Order: Anguilliformes
- Family: Ophichthidae
- Genus: Bascanichthys
- Species: B. bascanium

Binomial name
- Bascanichthys bascanium (Jordan, 1884)

Synonyms
- Caecula bascanium Jordan, 1884; Leptocephalus gilberti Eigenmann & Kennedy, 1902

= Sooty eel =

Species of fish

The sooty eel (Bascanichthys bascanium) is an eel in the family Ophichthidae (worm/snake eels). It was described by David Starr Jordan in 1884, originally under the genus Caecula. It is a marine, subtropical eel which is known from the western Atlantic Ocean, including North Carolina and Florida, USA, and the Gulf of Mexico. It dwells at a depth range of 0 to 27 metres (0 to 89 ft). Males can reach a maximum total length of 70 centimetres (2.3 ft).

The sooty eel is preyed on by the Atlantic tripletail.
