= Callechelys papulosa =

Scientific classification
- Domain: Eukaryota
- Kingdom: Animalia
- Phylum: Chordata
- Class: Actinopterygii
- Order: Anguilliformes
- Family: Ophichthidae
- Genus: Callechelys
- Species: C. papulosa

Binomial name
- Callechelys papulosa McCosker, 1998

Species of fish

Callechelys papulosa, the blistered snake eel, is an eel in the family Ophichthidae (worm/snake eels). It was described by John E. McCosker in 1998. It is a tropical, marine eel which is known from Papua New Guinea, in the western central Pacific Ocean. It is known to dwell at a depth of 10 metres, and to inhabit regions of sand and grass. Males can reach a maximum total length of 55.1 centimetres.
