= Axoclinus rubinoffi =

Conservation status
- Vulnerable (IUCN 3.1)

Scientific classification
- Kingdom: Animalia
- Phylum: Chordata
- Class: Actinopterygii
- Order: Blenniiformes
- Family: Tripterygiidae
- Genus: Axoclinus
- Species: A. rubinoffi

Binomial name
- Axoclinus rubinoffi Allen & Robertson, 1992

Species of fish

Axoclinus rubinoffi, known commonly as Rubinoff's triplefin, is a species of triplefin blenny. This species is endemic to Malpelo Island in the eastern Pacific off Colombia. The specific name of this fish honours the American marine biologist Ira Rubinoff (b. 1938), Director of the Smithsonian Tropical Research Institute.
