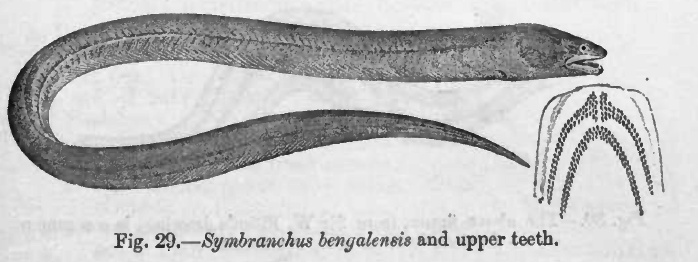
- Bengal eel (O. bengalense)

Scientific classification
- Kingdom: Animalia
- Phylum: Chordata
- Class: Actinopterygii
- Division: Teleostei
- Order: Synbranchiformes
- Family: Synbranchidae
- Subfamily: Synbranchinae
- Genus: Ophisternon; McClelland, 1844

Type species
- Ophisternon bengalensis McClelland, 1844

Species
- see text

Synonyms
- Anommatophasma Mees, 1962; Furmastix Whitley, 1951; Pluto Hubbs, 1938; Tetrabranchus Bleeker, 1851

= Ophisternon =

Genus of fishes

Ophisternon is a genus of swamp eels found in fresh and brackish waters in South and Southeast Asia, New Guinea, Australia, Middle America and West Africa. Two species are blind cave-dwellers.

Well-preserved fossil remains of an Ophisternon sp. are known from the early Pleistocene-aged Laguna Formation of the Philippines, representing the oldest known fossil record of this genus.

== Species ==
There are currently seven recognized species in this genus:

- Ophisternon aenigmaticum D. E. Rosen & Greenwood, 1976 (Obscure swamp eel)
- Ophisternon afrum (Boulenger, 1909) (Guinea swamp eel)
- Ophisternon bengalense McClelland, 1844 (Bengal eel)
- Ophisternon candidum (Mees, 1962) (Blind cave eel)
- Ophisternon gutturale (J. Richardson, 1845) (Australian swamp eel)
- Ophisternon infernale (C. L. Hubbs, 1938) (Blind swamp eel)
- Ophisternon berlini (J. Arroyave, 2024) (Berlin's bloodworm eel)
