= Callechelys bitaeniata =

Scientific classification
- Domain: Eukaryota
- Kingdom: Animalia
- Phylum: Chordata
- Class: Actinopterygii
- Order: Anguilliformes
- Family: Ophichthidae
- Genus: Callechelys
- Species: C. bitaeniata

Binomial name
- Callechelys bitaeniata (Peters, 1877)

Synonyms
- Ophichthys bitaeniatus Peters, 1877; Callechelys canaliculatus Smith, 1958

Species of fish

Callechelys bitaeniata is an eel in the family Ophichthidae (worm/snake eels). It was described by Wilhelm Peters in 1877. It is a tropical, marine eel which is known from the western Indian Ocean, including Kenya, Mozambique and Seychelles. Males can reach a maximum total length of 82 centimetres.

The species epithet "bitaeniata" means "two-striped" in Latin. Due to its large distribution and lack of notable threats, the IUCN redlist currently lists the species as Least Concern.
