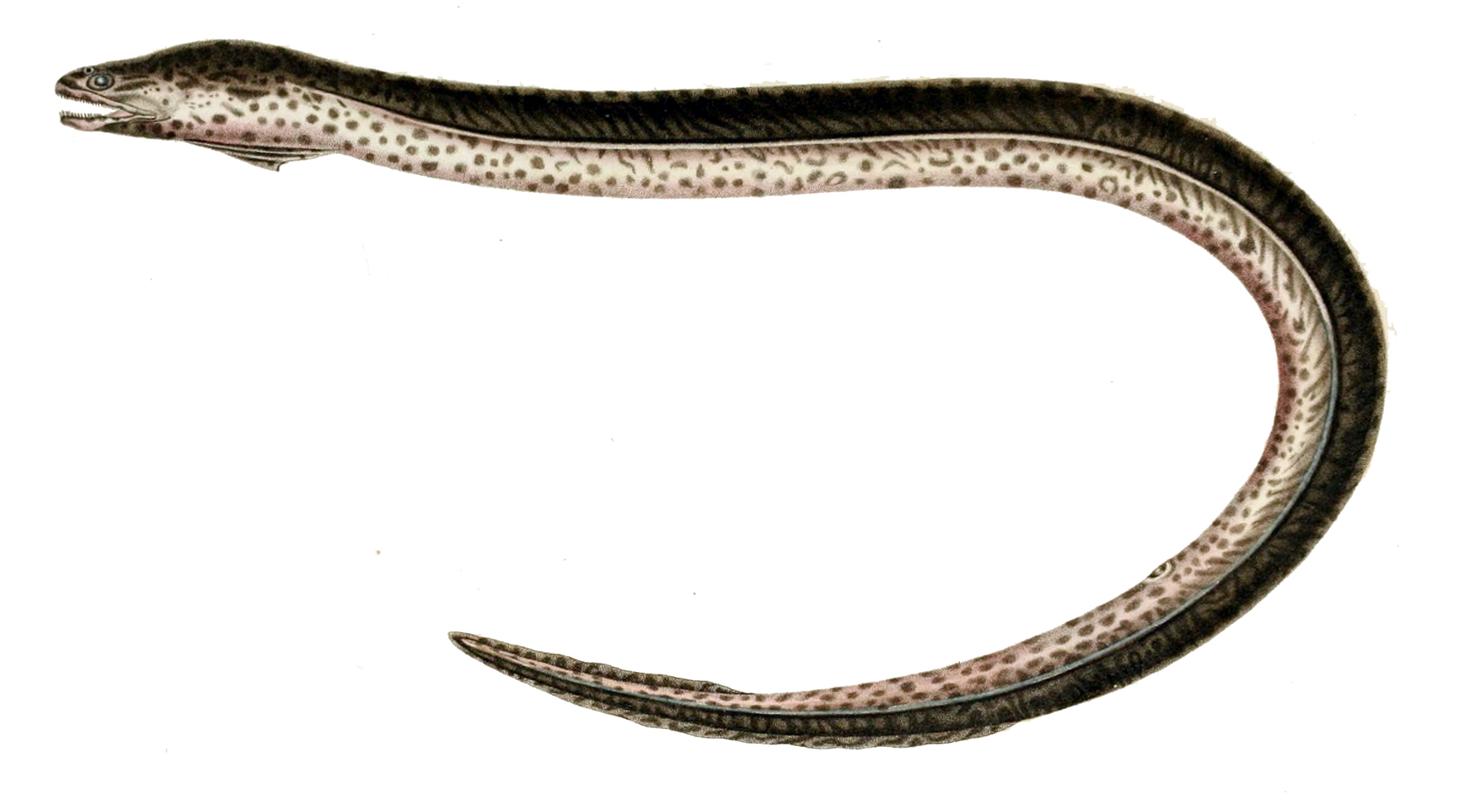
- Marbled Swamp Eel (S. marmoratus)

Scientific classification
- Kingdom: Animalia
- Phylum: Chordata
- Class: Actinopterygii
- Division: Teleostei
- Order: Synbranchiformes
- Family: Synbranchidae
- Subfamily: Synbranchinae
- Genus: Synbranchus; Bloch, 1795

Type species
- Synbranchus marmoratus Bloch, 1795

Synonyms
- Typhlobranchus Bloch & Schneider, 1801; Unibranchapertura Lacépède, 1803; Unipertura Duméril, 1856

= Synbranchus =

Genus of fishes

Synbranchus is a genus of swamp eels native to Central and South America.

== Species ==
There are currently four recognized species in this genus:

- Synbranchus lampreia Favorito, Zanata & Assumpção, 2005
- Synbranchus madeirae D. E. Rosen & Rumney, 1972
- Synbranchus marmoratus Bloch, 1795 (Marbled swamp eel)
- Synbranchus royal Sabaj Pérez, Arce H. & de Sousa, 2022
