= Bascanichthys longipinnis =

Scientific classification
- Domain: Eukaryota
- Kingdom: Animalia
- Phylum: Chordata
- Class: Actinopterygii
- Order: Anguilliformes
- Family: Ophichthidae
- Genus: Bascanichthys
- Species: B. longipinnis

Binomial name
- Bascanichthys longipinnis (Kner & Steindachner, 1867)

Synonyms
- Sphagebranchus longipinnis Kner & Steindachner, 1867

Species of fish

Bascanichthys longipinnis is an eel in the family Ophichthidae (worm/snake eels). It was described by Rudolf Kner and Franz Steindachner in 1867. It is a tropical, marine and brackish water-dwelling eel which is known from the Indian and Pacific Ocean, including India, Sri Lanka, Papua New Guinea, and Samoa.
