= Pacific worm eel =

Conservation status
- Least Concern (IUCN 3.1)

Scientific classification
- Kingdom: Animalia
- Phylum: Chordata
- Class: Actinopterygii
- Order: Anguilliformes
- Family: Ophichthidae
- Genus: Myrophis
- Species: M. vafer

Binomial name
- Myrophis vafer Jordan & C. H. Gilbert, 1883

Synonyms
- Hesperomyrus fryi Myers & Storey, 1939

Species of fish

The Pacific worm eel (Myrophis vafer, also known commonly as the worm eel in the United Kingdom) is an eel in the family Ophichthidae (worm/snake eels). It was described by David Starr Jordan and Charles Henry Gilbert in 1883. It is a marine, subtropical eel which is known from the eastern central and southeastern Pacific Ocean, including California, USA, Colombia, Costa Rica, El Salvador, Ecuador, Honduras, Mexico, Guatemala, Panama, Nicaragua, and Peru. It dwells at a depth range of 1 to 12 metres (0 to 40 ft), and inhabits sand and mud sediments. Unlike many species of eel, it does not form burrows. Males can reach a maximum total length of 46 centimetres (1 ft 6 in).

Young Pacific worm eels are drawn to lights at the sea's surface. Due to its wide distribution, lack of known major threats and lack of observed population decline, the IUCN redlist currently lists the species as Least Concern.
