= Bascanichthys myersi =

Scientific classification
- Kingdom: Animalia
- Phylum: Chordata
- Class: Actinopterygii
- Order: Anguilliformes
- Family: Ophichthidae
- Genus: Bascanichthys
- Species: B. myersi

Binomial name
- Bascanichthys myersi (Herre, 1932)

Synonyms
- Callechelys myersi Herre, 1932

Species of fish

Bascanichthys myersi is an eel in the family Ophichthidae (worm/snake eels). It was described by Albert William Herre in 1932. It is a tropical, marine eel which is known from the western central Pacific Ocean, including Dumaguete, Negros Oriental, in the Philippines.

Named in honor of Stanford University ichthyologist George S. Myers (1905–1985), who was the one who first noticed an undeveloped pectoral fin at the posterior margin of each gill opening of the fish.

== Environment ==
Bascanichthys myersi is a marine, demersal species from the tropical Pacific.

== Relationship with humans ==
Bascanichthys myersi are a harmless species.
