= Axoclinus multicinctus =

Conservation status
- Vulnerable (IUCN 3.1)

Scientific classification
- Kingdom: Animalia
- Phylum: Chordata
- Class: Actinopterygii
- Order: Blenniiformes
- Family: Tripterygiidae
- Genus: Axoclinus
- Species: A. multicinctus

Binomial name
- Axoclinus multicinctus Allen & Robertson, 1992

Species of fish

Axoclinus multicinctus, known commonly as the multibarred triplefin, is a species of triplefin blenny. This species is endemic to the eastern Pacificwhere it is known to occur only from the Revillagigedo Islands of Socorro and San Benedicto.
