= Callechelys bilinearis =

Scientific classification
- Domain: Eukaryota
- Kingdom: Animalia
- Phylum: Chordata
- Class: Actinopterygii
- Order: Anguilliformes
- Family: Ophichthidae
- Genus: Callechelys
- Species: C. bilinearis

Binomial name
- Callechelys bilinearis Kanazawa, 1952

Species of fish

Callechelys bilinearis, the twostripe snake eel, is an eel in the family Ophichthidae (worm and snake eels). It was described by Robert H. Kanazawa in 1952. It is a marine, tropical eel which is known from the western and southeastern Atlantic Ocean, including Bermuda, the West Indies, Lesser Antilles, St. Helena Island and Ascension Island. It dwells at a depth range of 0 to 22 metres (0 to 72 ft), most often at around 0 to 5 metres (0 to 16 ft). Males can reach a maximum total length of 172.4 centimetres (67.9 in).

The species epithet "bilinearis", treated as an adjective, means "two-lined" in Latin, and refers to the pair of stripes along the length of the eel's body.
