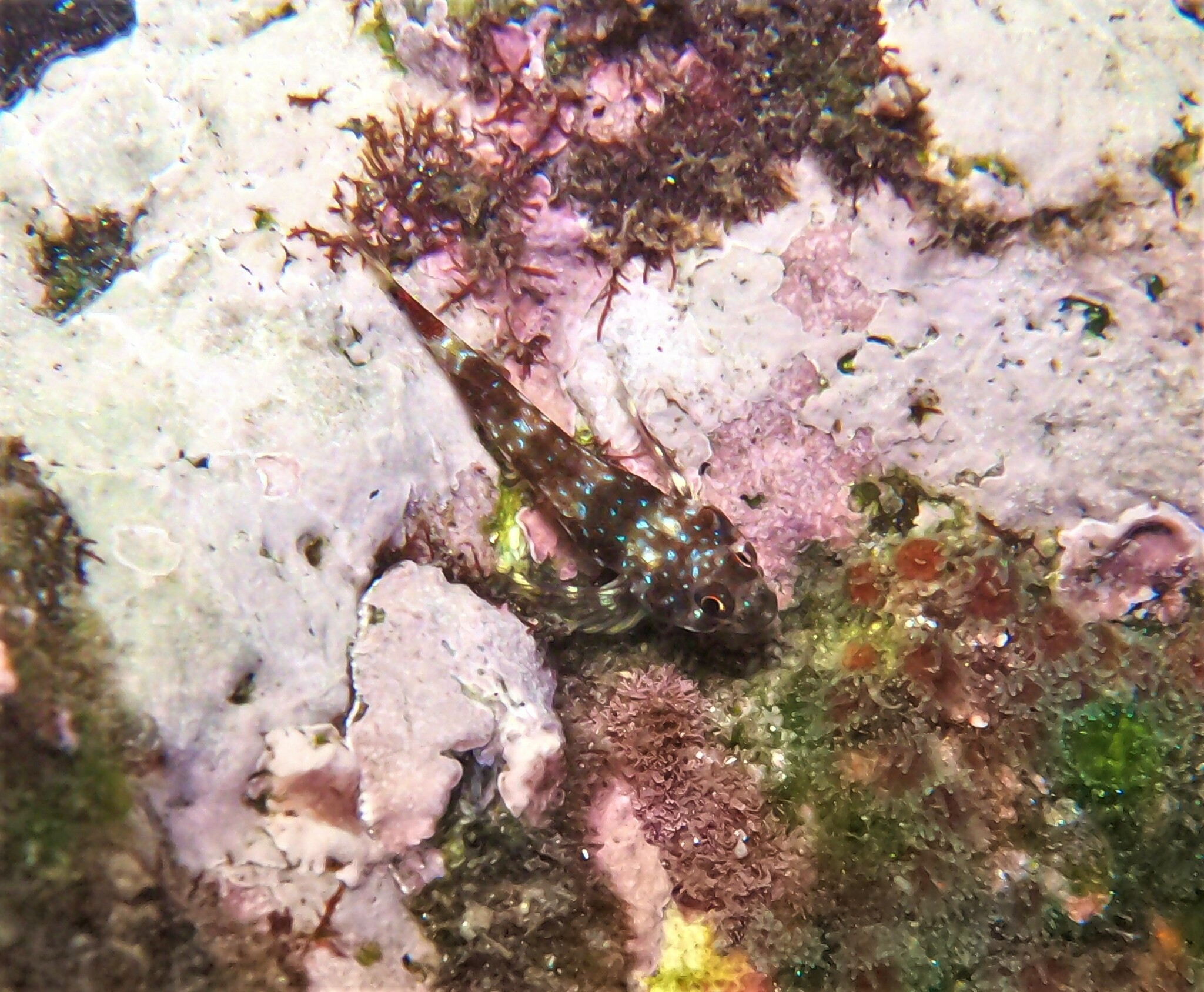

Conservation status
- Least Concern (IUCN 3.1)

Scientific classification
- Kingdom: Animalia
- Phylum: Chordata
- Class: Actinopterygii
- Order: Blenniiformes
- Family: Tripterygiidae
- Genus: Axoclinus
- Species: A. lucillae

Binomial name
- Axoclinus lucillae Fowler, 1944

= Axoclinus lucillae =

Species of fish

Axoclinus lucillae, known commonly as the Panama triplefin, is a species of triplefin blenny. They occur in the eastern Pacific in shallow rocky and coral areas as deep as 20 metres (66 ft) from Mexico to Colombia. The specific name honours Louise "Lulu" Miriam Parsons (1912–2013), the first wife of George Washington Vanderbilt III, although the eponym is more suggestive that the species is named after their daughter, Lucille Margaret Vanderbilt (1938 - 2018).
