= Ophichthys desilvai =

Conservation status
- Critically Endangered (IUCN 3.1)

Scientific classification
- Domain: Eukaryota
- Kingdom: Animalia
- Phylum: Chordata
- Class: Actinopterygii
- Order: Synbranchiformes
- Family: Synbranchidae
- Genus: Ophichthys
- Species: O. desilvai

Binomial name
- Ophichthys desilvai (R.M Bailey & Gans, 1998)

Synonyms
- Monopterus desilvai

Species of fish

Ophichthys desilvai (lesser swamp eel or Desilvai's blind eel) is a commercially important, air-breathing species of fish in the family Synbranchidae. It is endemic to Sri Lanka and is the only endemic synbranchid from there.

== Etymology ==
The specific name honours the Sri Lankan herpetologist Pilippu Hewa Don Hemasiri de Silva (b. 1927), who has been director of the National Museums of Ceylon, in recognition to the help and advice he gave to Carl Gans when he was conducting fieldwork in Sri Lanka.

== Taxonomy ==
It was formerly classified in the genus Monopterus but a 2020 study reclassified it into the resurrected genus Ophichthys along with several other former Monopterus species.

== Distribution and habitat ==
It is known from swamp areas and paddy fields from the west side of Sri Lanka. Some have been recovered from the Bolgoda swamp, an estuary southwest of Colombo. A 2020 study found specimens in the lowland coastal floodplain on the west side of the island as well as leafy vegetable plots cultivated within the Bolgoda swamp.

== Behavior ==
During reproduction, the male guards and builds a nest or burrow. They go to the surface of the water to breathe air and can stay submerged for up to 1–2 minutes before returning to the surface. During the dry season, they burrow underground and stay in the soil.

== Status ==
It has become critically endangered due to its restricted range combined with overfishing of mature individuals and runoff from paddy fields. A 2020 study found the species to be resilient and not require pristine habitat for survival, but that human activities such as landfills were destroying their habitats.
