= Callechelys springeri =

Conservation status
- Data Deficient (IUCN 3.1)

Scientific classification
- Kingdom: Animalia
- Phylum: Chordata
- Class: Actinopterygii
- Order: Anguilliformes
- Family: Ophichthidae
- Genus: Callechelys
- Species: C. springeri

Binomial name
- Callechelys springeri (Ginsburg, 1951)

Synonyms
- Gordiichthys springeri Ginsburg, 1951; Cryptopterygium holochroma Ginsburg, 1951

Species of fish

Callechelys springeri, the ridgefin eel, is an eel in the family Ophichthidae (worm/snake eels). It was described by Isaac Ginsburg in 1951, originally under the genus Gordiichthys. It is a marine, tropical eel which is known from the eastern Gulf of Mexico, in the western Atlantic Ocean. It dwells at a depth range of 22 to 36 metres (72 to 118 ft). Males can reach a maximum total length of 80.1 centimeters (31.5 in).
