= Panama sand-eel =

Scientific classification
- Kingdom: Animalia
- Phylum: Chordata
- Class: Actinopterygii
- Order: Anguilliformes
- Family: Ophichthidae
- Genus: Bascanichthys
- Species: B. panamensis

Binomial name
- Bascanichthys panamensis Meek & Hildebrand, 1923

Species of fish

The Panama sand-eel (Bascanichthys panamensis, also known as the Panamic sand-eel in Mexico) is an eel in the family Ophichthidae (worm/snake eels). It was described by Seth Eugene Meek and Samuel Frederick Hildebrand in 1923. It is a marine, tropical eel which is known from the eastern central Pacific Ocean, including the Gulf of California, Mexico, Costa Rica, Panama, and Nicaragua. It dwells at a maximum depth of 30 metres (98 ft), and inhabits sandy sediments, sometimes in estuaries and mangroves. Males can reach a maximum total length of 76 centimetres (30 in).

The IUCN redlist currently lists the Panama sand-eel as Least Concern, due to a lack of major threats and observed population decline. It notes, however, that coastal development in its range could prove problematic for the species.
