= Callechelys randalli =

Scientific classification
- Domain: Eukaryota
- Kingdom: Animalia
- Phylum: Chordata
- Class: Actinopterygii
- Order: Anguilliformes
- Family: Ophichthidae
- Genus: Callechelys
- Species: C. randalli

Binomial name
- Callechelys randalli McCosker, 1998

Species of fish

Callechelys randalli is an eel in the family Ophichthidae (worm/snake eels). It was described by John E. McCosker in 1998. It is a tropical, marine eel which is known from the Marquesan Islands, in the eastern central Pacific Ocean. It is known to inhabit sand at a depth of 35 metres. Males can reach a maximum total length of 46.4 centimetres.
