= Callechelys catostoma =

Conservation status
- Least Concern (IUCN 3.1)

Scientific classification
- Kingdom: Animalia
- Phylum: Chordata
- Class: Actinopterygii
- Division: Teleostei
- Order: Anguilliformes
- Family: Ophichthidae
- Genus: Callechelys
- Species: C. catostoma

Binomial name
- Callechelys catostoma (J. G. Schneider & J. R. Forster, 1801)

Synonyms
- Sphagebranchus catostomus Schneider, 1801; Callechelys catostomus (Schneider, 1801); Callechelys melanotaeni Bleeker, 1864; Callechelys melanotaenius Bleeker, 1864; Leptenchelys pinnaceps Schultz, 1953; Callechelys striatus Smith, 1958; Callechelys striata Smith, 1958

Species of fish

Callechelys catostoma, the black-striped snake eel or dark band snake eel,) is an eel in the family Ophichthidae (worm/snake eels). It was described by Johann Gottlob Theaenus Schneider and Johann Reinhold Forster in 1801. It is a tropical, marine eel which is known from the Indo-Pacific, including the Red Sea, East Africa, the Society Islands, the Ryukyu Islands, and Lord Howe Island. It dwells at a depth range of 1–32 metres, and inhabits reefs. It burrows into loose gravel and sand. Males can reach a maximum total length of 85 centimetres (33 in).
