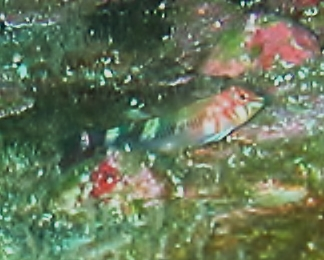
- Axoclinus cocoensis

Scientific classification
- Kingdom: Animalia
- Phylum: Chordata
- Class: Actinopterygii
- Order: Blenniiformes
- Family: Tripterygiidae
- Subfamily: Tripterygiinae
- Genus: Axoclinus; Fowler, 1944

Type species
- Axoclinus lucillae Fowler, 1844

Species
- 5, See text.

= Axoclinus =

Genus of fishes

Axoclinus is a genus of triplefins in the family Tripterygiidae. This genus has six described species. It is restricted to the eastern tropical Pacific.

The genus is characterised by having ctenoid scales, a lateral line which shows pored scales towards the head and notched scales towards the tail, the pelvic fins have two separated rays and the anal fin also has two spines and the possession of vomerine teeth but no palatine teeth.

== Species ==
The following species are classified in the genus:

- Cocos triplefin, Axoclinus cocoensis Bussing, 1991
- Panama triplefin, Axoclinus lucillae Fowler, 1944
- Multibarred triplefin, Axoclinus multicinctus Allen & Robertson, 1992
- Cortez triplefin, Axoclinus nigricaudus (Fricke, 1997)
- Rubinoff's triplefin, Axoclinus rubinoffi Allen & Robertson, 1992
- Axoclinus storeyae (Brock, 1940)
