= Margaret Hamilton Storey =

U.S. zoologist

- Born: July 31, 1900; San Francisco, California, U.S.
- Died: October 18, 1960
- Education: Cornell University (A.B.); Stanford University (M.A.)
- Scientific career
- Fields: Herpetology, Ichthyology
- Workplaces: Stanford University Natural History Museum

Margaret Hamilton Storey (July 31, 1900 – October 18, 1960) was an American museum curator, herpetologist and ichthyologist. She worked for the Stanford University Natural History Museum for over 25 years.

== Biography ==
Storey was born in San Francisco, California, into an educated household. Her father, Thomas Storey, was the founder of the Stanford University School of Health. Storey attended Cornell University, receiving an A.B. degree in 1922 and received her master's degree in 1936 from Stanford University. She began working at the Stanford Natural History Museum first as a volunteer, but in 1940, was given a "regular staff appointment." Storey worked as both a curator at the museum and also as a librarian of the zoological book collection She worked closely with George S. Myers, supervising the curating. She also edited the Stanford Ichthyological Bulletin and Occasional Papers. She would work at the museum for over twenty-five years.

Storey collected herpetological specimens from the United States Southwest deserts, the Rocky Mountains and Maine. She contributed notes, information and corrections for books about reptiles and amphibians. She described several fish species, including Bascanichthys paulensis, Harengula majorina and Callechelys perryae, and, with Myers, Hesperomyrus fryi. A species of Cuban gecko, Sphaerodactylus storeyae, and a species of triplefin blenny, Axoclinus storeyae, are named in her honor. Storey and Myers were also very involved in the Stanford Zoology Club, which dated back to the 1890s and in an ichthyology club called the Fishverein.

Storey also served as the only woman Amateur Athletic Union (AAU) track timer in the country for twenty six years.

Storey died after surgery on October 18, 1960. An award, given to the most improved runner on the Stanford Cardinals team, is named after her.

== Publications ==
- Storey, Margaret (1937). "The Relation Between Normal Range and Mortality of Fishes due to Cold at Sanibel Island, Florida". Ecology. 18 (1): 10–26. Bibcode:1937Ecol...18...10S. doi:10.2307/1932700. JSTOR 1932700. PMC 5822641. PMID 29466976.
- Storey, Margaret (1939). "Contributions toward a revision of the Ophichthyid eels. 1, The genera Callechelys and Bascanichthys, with descriptions of new species and notes on Myrichthys". Stanford Ichthyological Bulletin. 1 (3).

== Taxon described by her ==
- See Category:Taxa named by Margaret Hamilton Storey

== Taxon named in her honor ==
- The Triplefin Blenny Axoclinus storeyae (Brock, 1940)
- Sphaerodactylus storeyae, also known commonly as the Isle of Pines sphaero or the Los Canarreos geckolet, is a small species of gecko, a lizard in the family Sphaerodactylidae. The species is endemic to Isla de la Juventud in Cuba.
