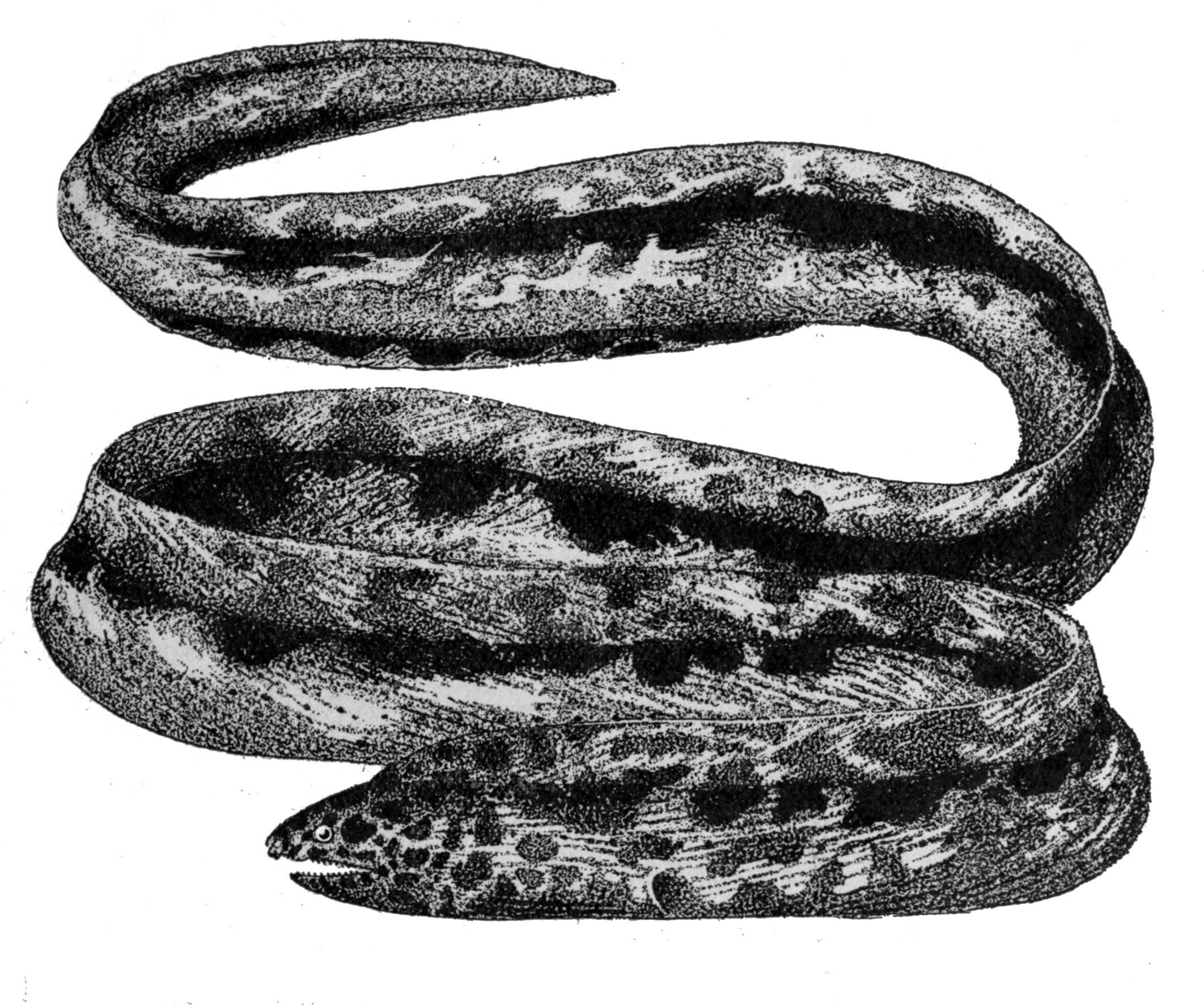

Scientific classification
- Kingdom: Animalia
- Phylum: Chordata
- Class: Actinopterygii
- Order: Anguilliformes
- Family: Ophichthidae
- Genus: Callechelys
- Species: C. marmorata

Binomial name
- Callechelys marmorata (Bleeker, 1854)

= Callechelys marmorata =

Species of fish

Callechelys marmorata, also known as the marbled snake eel, is a benthic marine fish belonging to the family Ophichthidae which refers to serpentine in shape fishes.

The Marbled snake eel is a medium-sized fish which grows up to 87 cm.

It is widely distributed throughout the tropical waters of the Indian Ocean, Red Sea included, to the western Pacific Ocean.

It inhabits the sandy and muddy bottoms close to coastal reefs, from 1 until 37 m in depth. The Marbled snake eel has a nocturnal activity.
