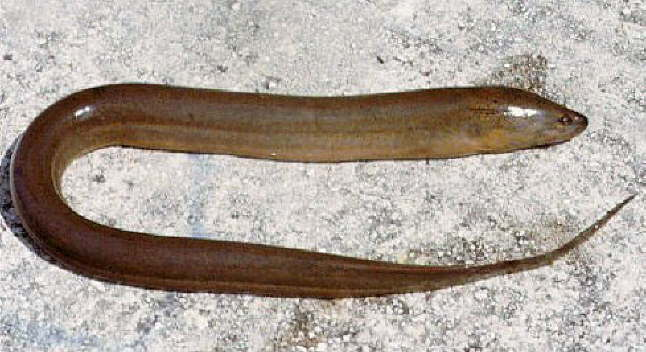
- Monopterus albus

Scientific classification
- Domain: Eukaryota
- Kingdom: Animalia
- Phylum: Chordata
- Class: Actinopterygii
- Order: Synbranchiformes
- Family: Synbranchidae
- Subfamily: Synbranchinae
- Genus: Monopterus; Lacépède, 1800

Type species
- Monopterus javanicus Lacépède, 1800

Synonyms
- Amphipnous Müller, 1840; Apterigia Basilewsky, 1855; Cryptophthalmus Franz, 1910; Fluta Bloch & Schneider, 1801; Ophicardia McClelland, 1844; Pneumabranchus McClelland, 1843; Unagius Jordan, 1919

= Monopterus =

Genus of fishes

Monopterus is a genus of swamp eels native to Asia. They live in various freshwater habitats and some have a fossorial lifestyle.

== Species ==
Four recognized species are placed in this genus:

- M. albus (Zuiew, 1793) (Asian swamp eel)
- M. bicolor H. D. Nguyễn & V. H. Nguyễn, 2005
- M. dienbienensis V. H. Nguyễn & H. D. Nguyễn, 2005
- M. javanensis Lacépède, 1800

Six species from South Asia (M. cuchia, M. desilvai, M. hodgarti, M. fossorius, M. ichthyophoides, and M. indicus) have been reclassified to the genus Ophichthys. Four fossorial or subterranean species (M. digressus, M. eapeni, M. rongsaw, and M. roseni) from India have been reclassified to the genus Rakthamichthys. Two species from Africa (M. boueti and M. luticolus) have been reclassified to the genus Typhlosynbranchus.
