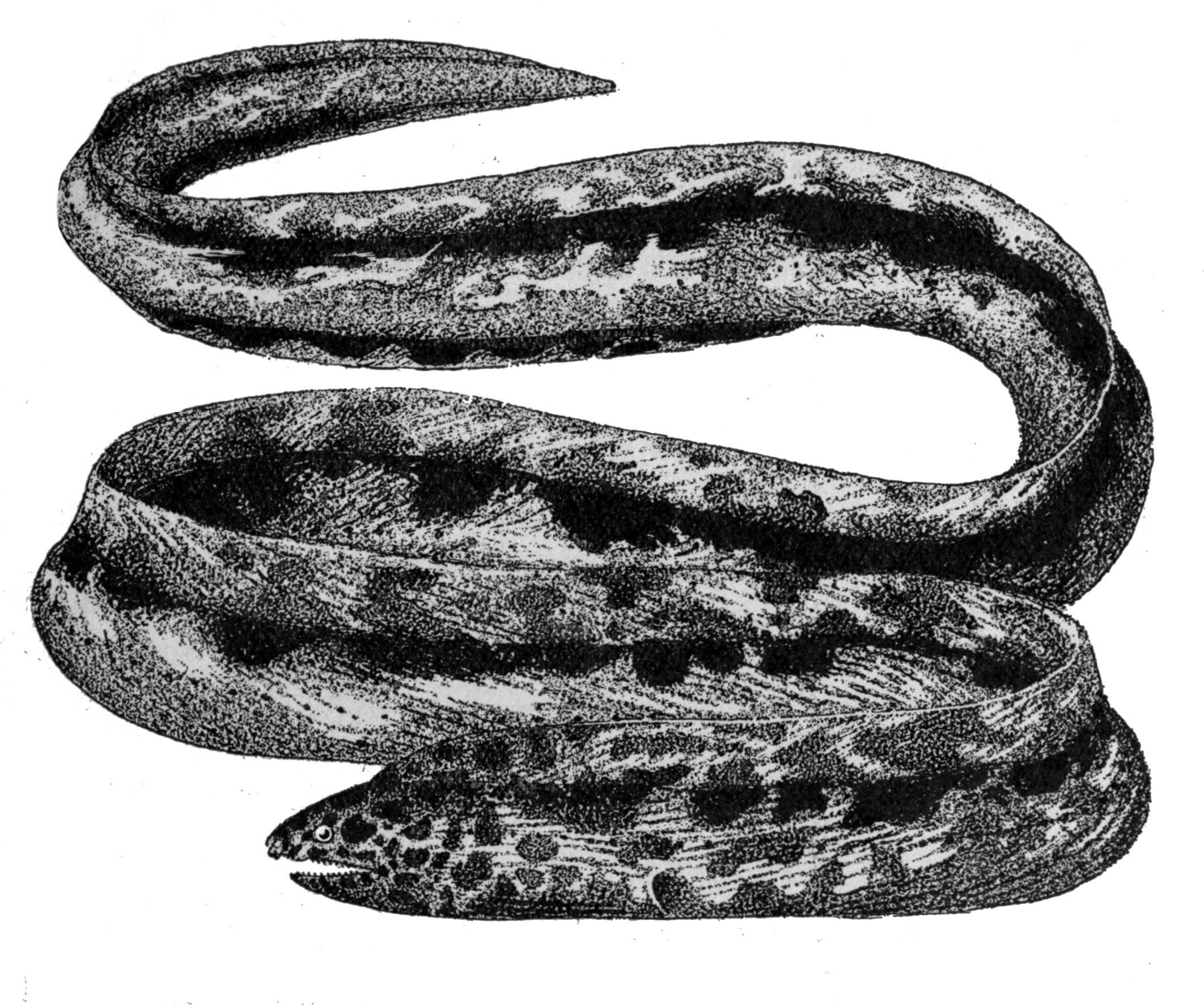
- Callechelys marmorata

Scientific classification
- Kingdom: Animalia
- Phylum: Chordata
- Class: Actinopterygii
- Order: Anguilliformes
- Family: Ophichthidae
- Subfamily: Ophichthinae
- Genus: Callechelys; Kaup, 1856

Type species
- Callechelys guichenoti Kaup, 1856

Species
- 15, see text

= Callechelys =

Genus of fishes

Callechelys is a genus of eels in the snake eel family Ophichthidae. It currently contains the following fifteen species:

- Callechelys bilinearis Kanazawa, 1952 (twostripe snake eel)
- Callechelys bitaeniata (W. K. H. Peters, 1877)
- Callechelys catostoma (J. G. Schneider & J. R. Forster, 1801) (black-striped snake eel)
- Callechelys cliffi J. E. Böhlke & Briggs, 1954 (sandy ridgefin eel)
- Callechelys eristigma McCosker & Rosenblatt, 1972 (spotted ridgefin eel)
- Callechelys galapagensis McCosker & Rosenblatt, 1972
- Callechelys guineensis (Osório, 1893) (shorttail snake eel)
- Callechelys leucoptera (Cadenat, 1954)
- Callechelys lutea Snyder, 1904 (yellow-spotted snake eel)
- Callechelys maculatus Y. T. Chu, H. L. Wu & X. B. Jin, 1981
- Callechelys marmorata (Bleeker, 1853) (marbled snake eel)
- Callechelys muraena D. S. Jordan & Evermann, 1887 (blotched snake eel)
- Callechelys papulosa McCosker, 1998
- Callechelys randalli McCosker, 1998
- Callechelys springeri (Ginsburg, 1951) (ridgefin eel)
