= Macrotrema caligans =

Scientific classification
- Domain: Eukaryota
- Kingdom: Animalia
- Phylum: Chordata
- Class: Actinopterygii
- Order: Synbranchiformes
- Family: Synbranchidae
- Subfamily: Macrotreminae; Rosen & Greenwood, 1976
- Genus: Macrotrema; Regan, 1912
- Species: M. caligans

Binomial name
- Macrotrema caligans (Cantor, 1849)

Synonyms
- Symbranchus caligans Cantor, 1849

Species of fish

Macrotrema caligans is a species of swamp eel native to Peninsular Malaysia and the Mae Nam Chao Praya basin in Thailand. The male guards a nest in a burrow. This species is the only known member of its genus.
