= Tamhini Ghat =

Mountain pass in India

- Interactive map of Tamhini Ghat

Location
- Location: Maharashtra, India
- Range: Sahyadri
- Coordinates: 18.4493386°N 73.4227198°E

Tamhini Ghat is a mountain passage located between Mulshi and Tamhini in Maharashtra, India.

Situated on the crest of the Western Ghat mountain ranges, Tamhini Ghat is noted for its surroundings comprising scenic waterfalls, lakes and dense woods. The best time to visit is October through December.

== History ==
Tamhini Ghat did not exist earlier, as the whole area was under the administration of Tata Power. Considering the requirement of additional routes to route traffic in Konkan from Pune and Lonawala, this route was proposed.

== Road ==
The Tamhini road ghat cuts the Sahyadri range to join Mulshi to Tamhini and makes the route in Konkan from Pune. This ghat stretches almost 15 km, and the newly laid road is now in a good state. The entire stretch becomes a popular destination during the monsoons. During the rainy season, the area transforms into a green bed with numerous waterfalls and streams. There are state buses which ply through the ghat connecting Pune city with areas on the Goa highway (NH17).

Tamhini Ghat can be accessed from Mumbai via the Mumbai-Goa Highway by reaching Kolad, and upon crossing a bridge over the Kundalika River, a left turn leads to Pune via the Mulshi Dam backwaters. Tamhini Ghat is the stretch between Kolad and these backwaters. It contains different kinds of green velvety carpets, gushing streams, dark grey clouds stooping low, and the occasional waterfall. These impromptu waterfalls attract tourists from far and wide.

From Tamhini Ghat, the road leading to the Mulshi Dam backwaters continues to the waterfall at Palse. This particular waterfall is becoming increasingly crowded in recent times. Further ahead lies Kolad, which is now becoming popular for river rafting along the Kundalika.

== Rail ==
The Central Railway Zone & Indian Railways planned a connection between Pimpri Chinchwad to Kolad of Konkan Railway in Maharshatra. The project was termed Kundalika River Valley Railway. However, the plan was scrapped following a survey of the region, which concluded that neither a broad-gauge nor a metre-gauge railway could be constructed in Tamhini Ghat Region. Later, a survey was carried out again for construction of a narrow-gauge line, but it was also scrapped.
