= Pointe-Noire Bay =

Bay in the Republic of the Congo

- Baie de Pointe Noire (French)
- Location in the Republic of the Congo
- Coordinates: 4°44′S 11°49′E
- Ocean/sea sources: Atlantic Ocean
- Basin countries: Republic of the Congo
- Max. length: 9 km (5.6 mi)
- Max. width: 3.8 km (2.4 mi)

Pointe-Noire Bay (French: Baie de Pointe-Noire) is a small bay in the Republic of the Congo, at 4.7433333°S 11.8252778°E. The city of Pointe-Noire lies at the southern end of the bay.
