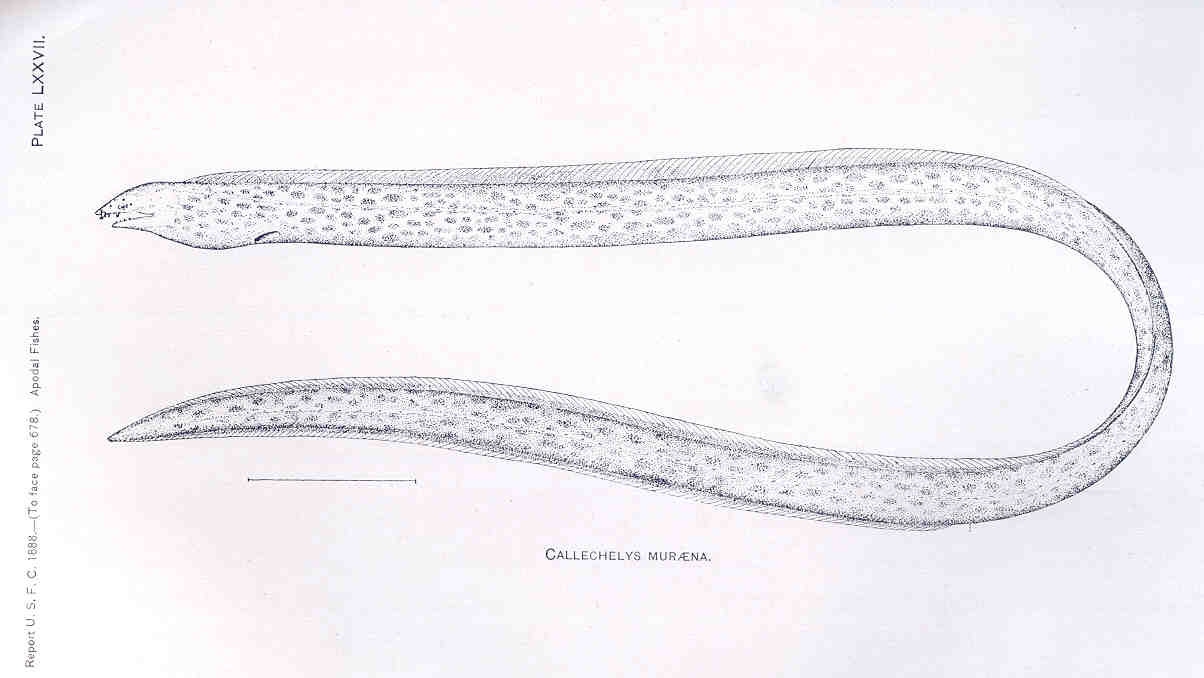

Scientific classification
- Domain: Eukaryota
- Kingdom: Animalia
- Phylum: Chordata
- Class: Actinopterygii
- Order: Anguilliformes
- Family: Ophichthidae
- Genus: Callechelys
- Species: C. muraena

Binomial name
- Callechelys muraena Jordan & Evermann, 1887

= Callechelys muraena =

Species of fish

Callechelys muraena, the blotched snake eel, is an eel in the family Ophichthidae (worm/snake eels). It was described by David Starr Jordan and Barton Warren Evermann in 1887. It is a rare tropical, marine eel which is known from the western and northwestern Atlantic Ocean, including the United States (North Carolina to Florida), the Gulf of Mexico, the Yucatan Peninsula, and Canada. It dwells at a depth range of 27–115 metres. Males can reach a maximum total length of 60 centimetres.
