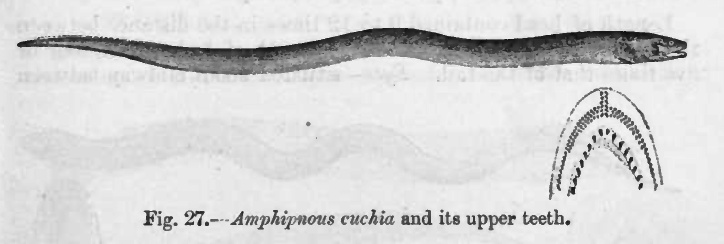
- Ophichthys cuchia

Scientific classification
- Kingdom: Animalia
- Phylum: Chordata
- Class: Actinopterygii
- Order: Synbranchiformes
- Family: Synbranchidae
- Subfamily: Synbranchinae
- Genus: Ophichthys; Swainson, 1839

Species
- See text

= Ophichthys =

Genus of fishes

Ophichthys is a genus of swamp eels native to South Asia. They live in freshwater or subterranean habitats, and some have a fossorial lifestyle.

== Taxonomy ==
All species in this genus were formerly classified in Monopterus, but a 2020 study found them to represent a distinct monophyletic clade from Monopterus. Due to this, the genus name Ophichthys, previously coined by William Swainson, was revived to be used for them. Ophichthys was formerly a wastebasket taxon used to lump in many unrelated species of eel-like fish (all of which are classified in separate genera today) and later synonymized with Monopterus until its resurrection.

== Species ==
- Ophichthys cuchia (F. Hamilton, 1822) (Gangetic swamp eel or Gangetic mud-eel)
- Ophichthys desilvai (R. M. Bailey & Gans, 1998) (lesser swamp eel or Desilvai's blind eel)
- Ophichthys fossorius (K. K. Nayar, 1951) (Malabar swamp eel)
- Ophichthys hodgarti (B. L. Chaudhuri, 1913) (Indian spaghetti-eel)
- Ophichthys ichthyophoides (Britz, Lalremsanga, Lalrotluanga & Lalramliana, 2011) (scaled swamp eel)
- Ophichthys indicus (Silas & E. Dawson, 1961) (Bombay swamp eel)
- Ophichthys terricolus
