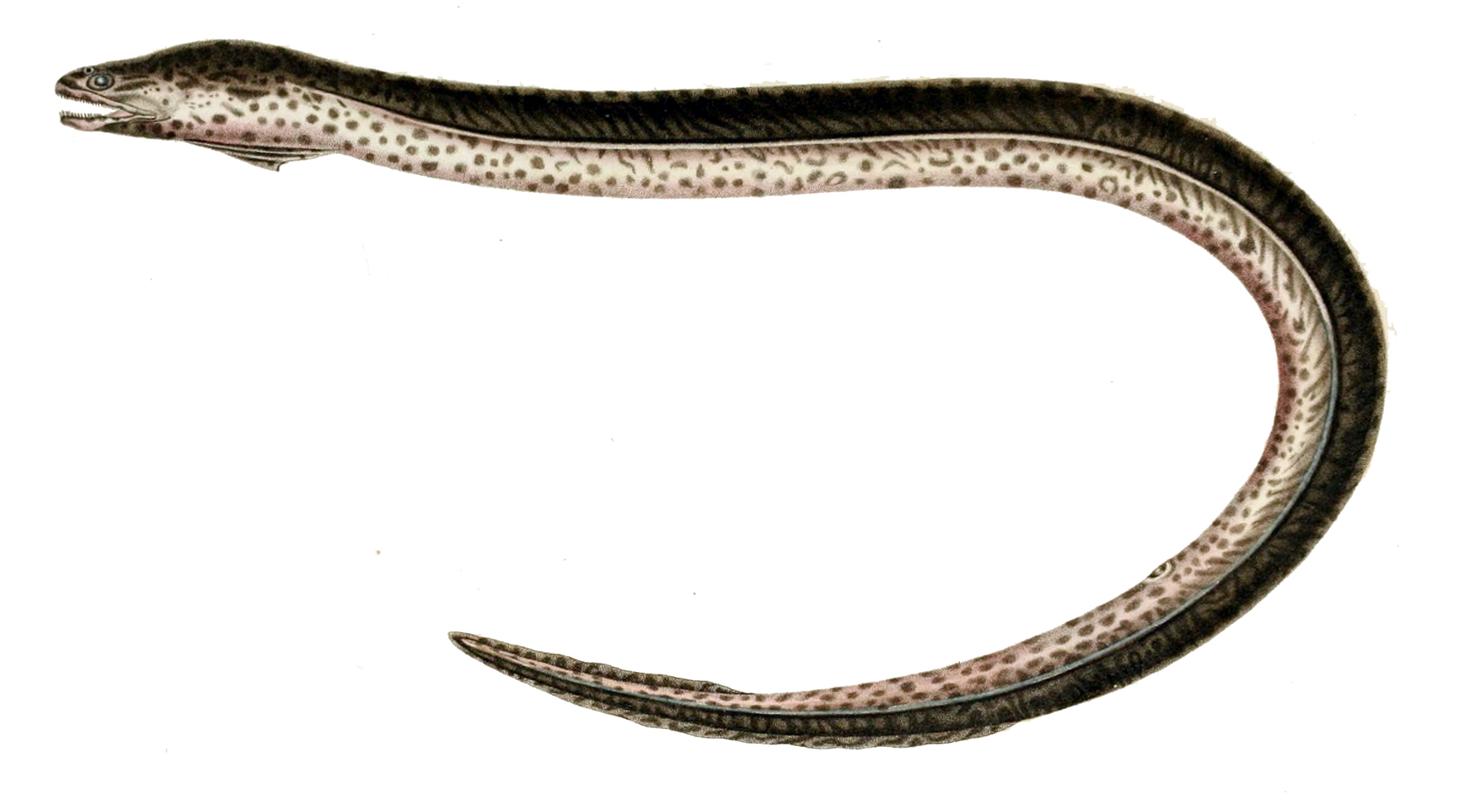
- Marbled swamp eel

Conservation status
- Least Concern (IUCN 3.1)

Scientific classification
- Kingdom: Animalia
- Phylum: Chordata
- Class: Actinopterygii
- Division: Teleostei
- Order: Synbranchiformes
- Family: Synbranchidae
- Genus: Synbranchus
- Species: S. marmoratus

Binomial name
- Synbranchus marmoratus Bloch, 1795

Synonyms
- Falconeria aptera Larrañaga, 1923; Falconeria pinnata Larrañaga, 1923; Symbranchus doringii Weyenbergh, 1877; Symbranchus hieronymi Weyenbergh, 1877; Symbranchus marmoratus Bloch, 1795 (misspelling); Symbranchus tigrinus Weyenbergh, 1877; Synbranchus doringii Weyenbergh, 1877; Synbranchus fuliginosus Ranzani, 1840; Synbranchus hieronymi Weyenbergh, 1877; Synbranchus immaculatus Bloch, 1795; Synbranchus mercedarius Weyenbergh, 1877; Synbranchus pardalis Valenciennes, 1836; Synbranchus tigrinus Weyenbergh, 1877; Synbranchus vittatus Castelnau, 1855; Unibranchapertura lineata Lacépède, 1803

= Synbranchus marmoratus =

Species of fish

Synbranchus marmoratus, the marbled swamp eel, neotropical swamp eel, marmorated swamp eel, mottled swamp eel, zangee, or muçum is a species of swamp eel native to Central and South America, including the island of Trinidad and Grenada.

== Description ==
The marbled swamp eel has an elongated cylindrical body and can grow to a maximum length of about 150 cm (60 in), although a more normal adult length is 50 cm (20 in). The dorsal and anal fins are vestigial and the paired pectoral and pelvic fins are missing altogether. The lining of the mouth is rich in blood vessels and provides an additional surface for gas exchange when the swamp eel breathes air.

== Ecology ==
When in water, the marbled swamp eel is able to use its fully functional gills to breathe, whereas on land it can breathe with the lining of the mouth and pharynx. It is a nocturnal predator and feeds on any small prey in its environment such as frogs, tadpoles, fish, spiders, insects and other invertebrates. It moves through dense vegetation on river banks, searches shallow water areas for prey and descends into burrows to find concealed animals. When on land it lives in a burrow, and tunnels more deeply as the ground becomes drier so as to keep below the water table. In the laboratory, these eels have remained alive in drying-out burrows for over six months, moving about through the tunnels.

The marbled swamp eel is one of the few fish found up-river of large waterfalls and is a major predator of tadpoles in locations that other fish cannot access. It is a sequential hermaphrodite, and this is an advantage when it colonises new areas or encounters severe habitats. Juvenile fish can be either male, known as a primary male, or female. Females transition into male fish, known as secondary males, at a length of between 45 and 60 cm (18 and 24 in). Secondary males can be told from primary males by examination of their gonads. The male digs a burrow and guards the nest.
