= Pigfish =

Pigfish may refer to:

- Fishes in the family Congiopodidae
- Redmouth grunt, Orthopristis chrysoptera (Linnaeus)
- Golden-spot hogfish, Bodianus perditio
- Red pigfish, Bodianus unimaculatus
