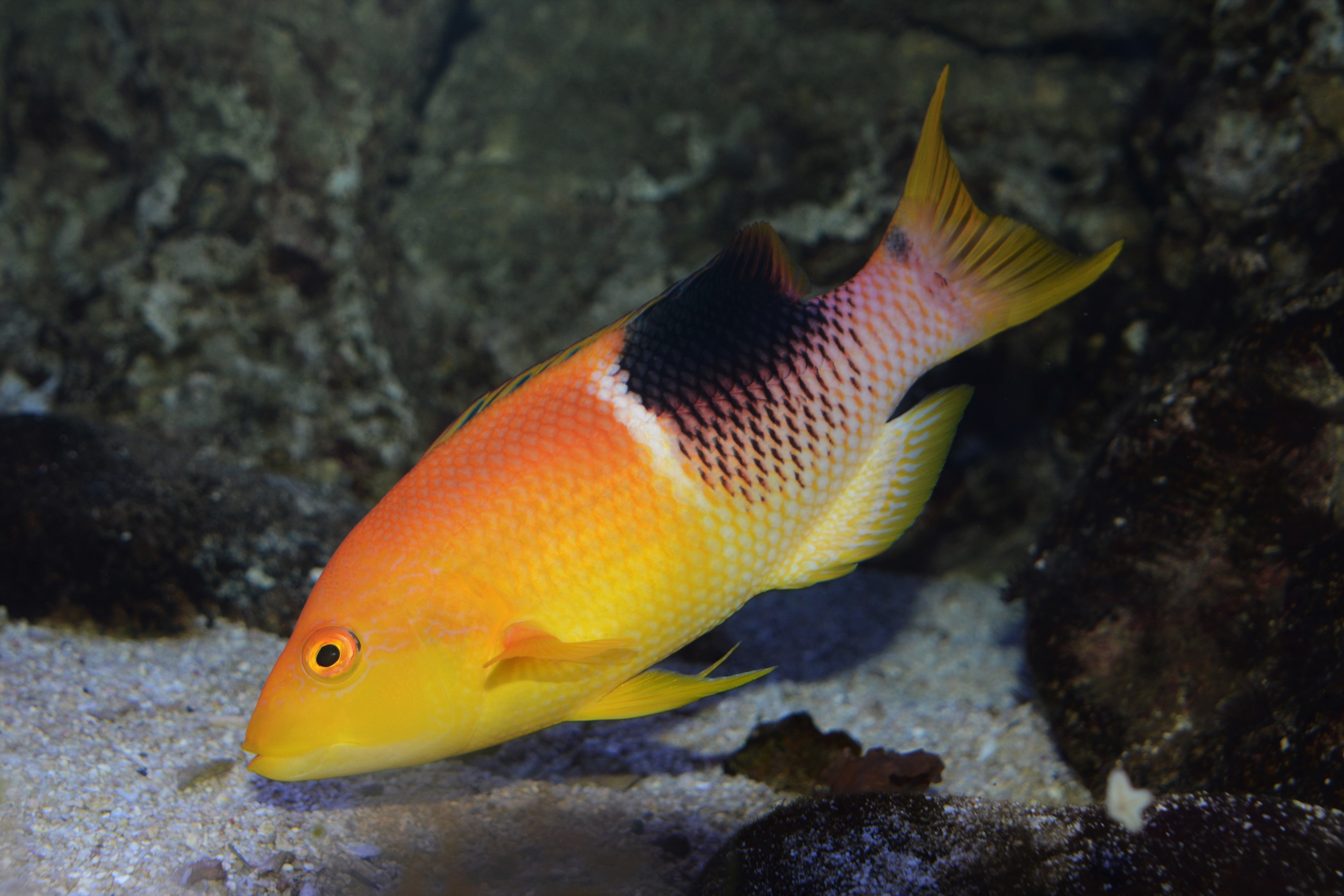
- Bodianus atrolumbus in Zoo Duisburg

Conservation status
- Data Deficient (IUCN 3.1)

Scientific classification
- Domain: Eukaryota
- Kingdom: Animalia
- Phylum: Chordata
- Class: Actinopterygii
- Order: Labriformes
- Family: Labridae
- Genus: Bodianus
- Species: B. atrolumbus

Binomial name
- Bodianus atrolumbus (Valenciennes, 1839)

Synonyms
- Cossyphus atrolumbus Valenciennes, 1839; Cossyphus nigromaculatus (Gilchrist & Thompson, 1908); Chaeropsodes pictus (Gilchrist & Thompson, 1908)

= Bodianus atrolumbus =

Species of fish

Bodianus atrolumbus, the pale-bar hogfish, is a species of wrasse from the genus Bodianus. The fish lives in the Western Indian Pacific between the Mascarene Islands and the coast of Southeast Africa. It's a tropical reef inhabitant that feeds on invertebrates like sea urchins and crabs. It grows to a length of 30 centimetres. The fish looks similar to his family member Bodianus perditio but has more yellow or golden colours. Both species have the typical white line with the large black spot behind it.
