= Bodianus neopercularis =

Conservation status
- Data Deficient (IUCN 3.1)

Scientific classification
- Kingdom: Animalia
- Phylum: Chordata
- Class: Actinopterygii
- Order: Labriformes
- Family: Labridae
- Genus: Bodianus
- Species: B. neopercularis

Binomial name
- Bodianus neopercularis Gomon, 2006

Species of fish

Bodianus neopercularis, is a species of wrasse from the family Labridae which is native to tropical and warm temperate waters of the Indo-West Pacific, particularly the Marshall Islands. A record of Bodianus opercularis from Palau has now been reidentified as this species.
