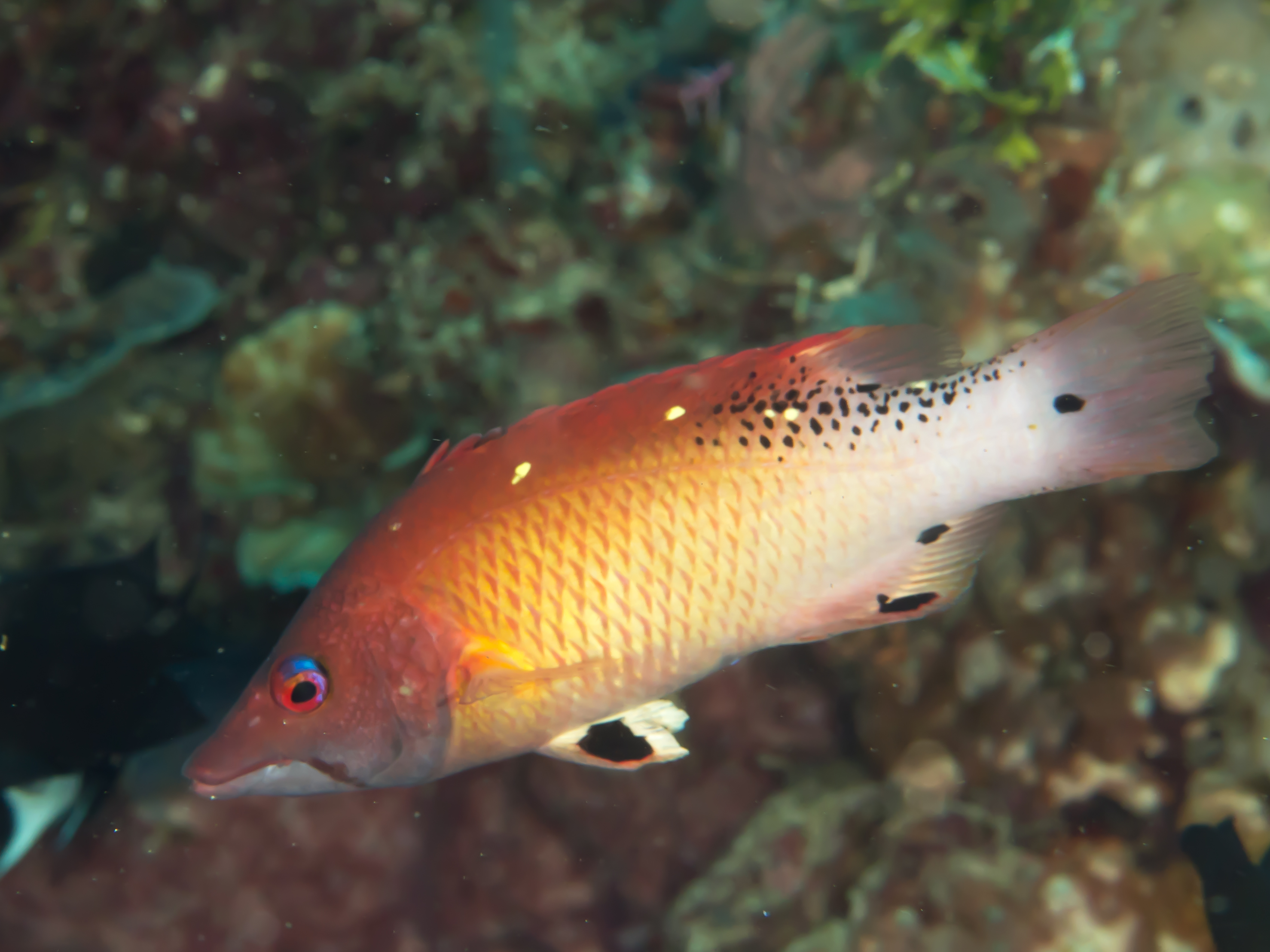

Conservation status
- Least Concern (IUCN 3.1)

Scientific classification
- Kingdom: Animalia
- Phylum: Chordata
- Class: Actinopterygii
- Order: Labriformes
- Family: Labridae
- Genus: Bodianus
- Species: B. dictynna

Binomial name
- Bodianus dictynna Gomon, 2006

= Bodianus dictynna =

Species of fish

Bodianus dictynna, is a species of wrasse native to tropical and warm temperate waters of the Western Pacific, from the Indo-Malaysian Archipelago east to Tonga, as far north as Japan and as far south as Australia. It is most frequently recorded in association with living coral reefs and the juvenile fish usually occur near black coral and gorgonians, although they sometimes are found in caves near the ceiling. It feeds mainly on benthic invertebrates such as molluscs and crustaceans. The juveniles regularly behave as cleaner fish, removing parasites from other fish. The specific name dictynna is an alternative name for Diana, the Roman goddess of hunting, and refers to the close relationship between this species and Bodianus diana of the Indian Ocean, and a proposed common name of Pacific Diana's pigfish also reflects this relationship.
