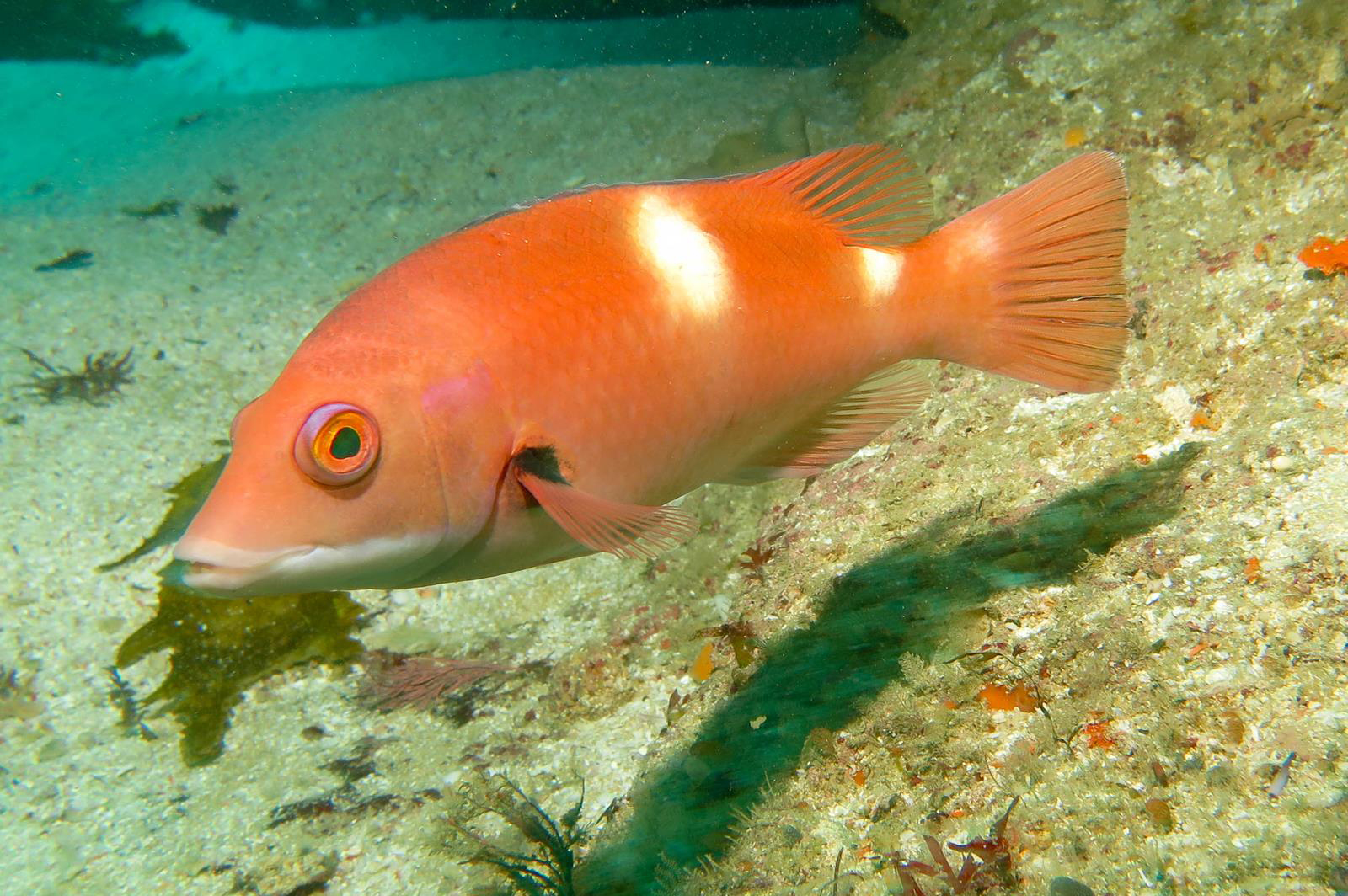
- Foxfish Bodianus frenchii off Rottnest Island

Conservation status
- Near Threatened (IUCN 3.1)

Scientific classification
- Kingdom: Animalia
- Phylum: Chordata
- Class: Actinopterygii
- Order: Labriformes
- Family: Labridae
- Genus: Bodianus
- Species: B. frenchii

Binomial name
- Bodianus frenchii (Klunzinger, 1880)

Synonyms
- Cossyphus frenchii Klunzinger, 1879; Trochocopus rufus W. J. Macleay, 1878

= Foxfish =

Species of fish

The foxfish, Bodianus frenchii, is a species of wrasse native to the temperate marine waters in southwestern Western Australia to eastern South Australia, and from southern Queensland to eastern Tasmania, at depths between 10 and 40 m. A gap in the distribution of foxfish occurs through Victoria. Its length is up to 45 cm.

== Description ==
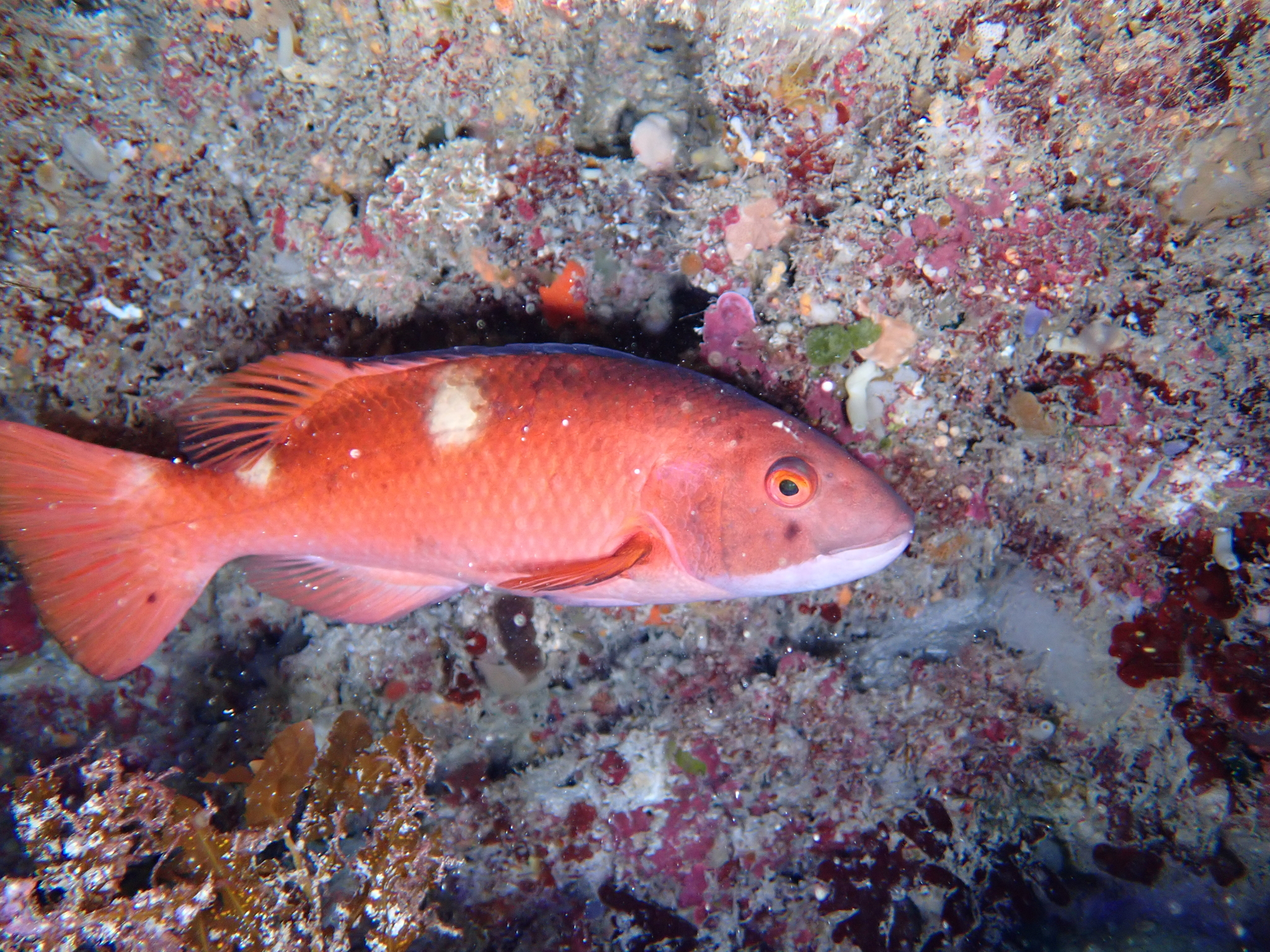
In Australia

The foxfish is brown, red, or orange with two spots on the back. When foxfish are juveniles, they are brown and have three yellow patches with a black area around the pectoral fin.

== Habitat and biology ==
Foxfish are typically found living under ledges and in caves. It is a long lived species which has been found living for up to 78 years, making it the longest lived wrasse species alongside the western blue groper.

Foxfish are protogynous hermaphrodites, and they spawn several times during the late spring and the summer. They form distinct pairs when breeding.

== Human uses ==
The foxfish is caught as bycatch in trawl fisheries off the coasts of New South Wales and Western Australia. In Western Australia it is a quarry for recreational anglers and the state applies bag limits. It is also taken for the aquarium trade and is prized in the United States.

== Taxonomy and etymology ==
Bodianus frenchii was formally described in 1879 as Cossyphus frenchii by Carl Benjamin Klunzinger with the type locality given as King George Sound, Western Australia. The specific name honours Herr French, who was an assistant to Dr V. Muller, who was the collector of many types of Australian fishes described by Klunzinger. The vernacular name, "foxfish", is thought to be taken from the misapplied binomial Bodianus vulpinus, as to most eyes this fish bears no resemblance to a fox.

There is a gap in the distribution of the foxfish off the coast of Victoria and the eastern and western populations show morphological differences and may be separated into different species.

== Sources ==
- "Bodianus frenchii". Integrated Taxonomic Information System.
- Froese, Rainer; Pauly, Daniel (eds.). "Bodianus frenchii". FishBase. November 2005 version.
