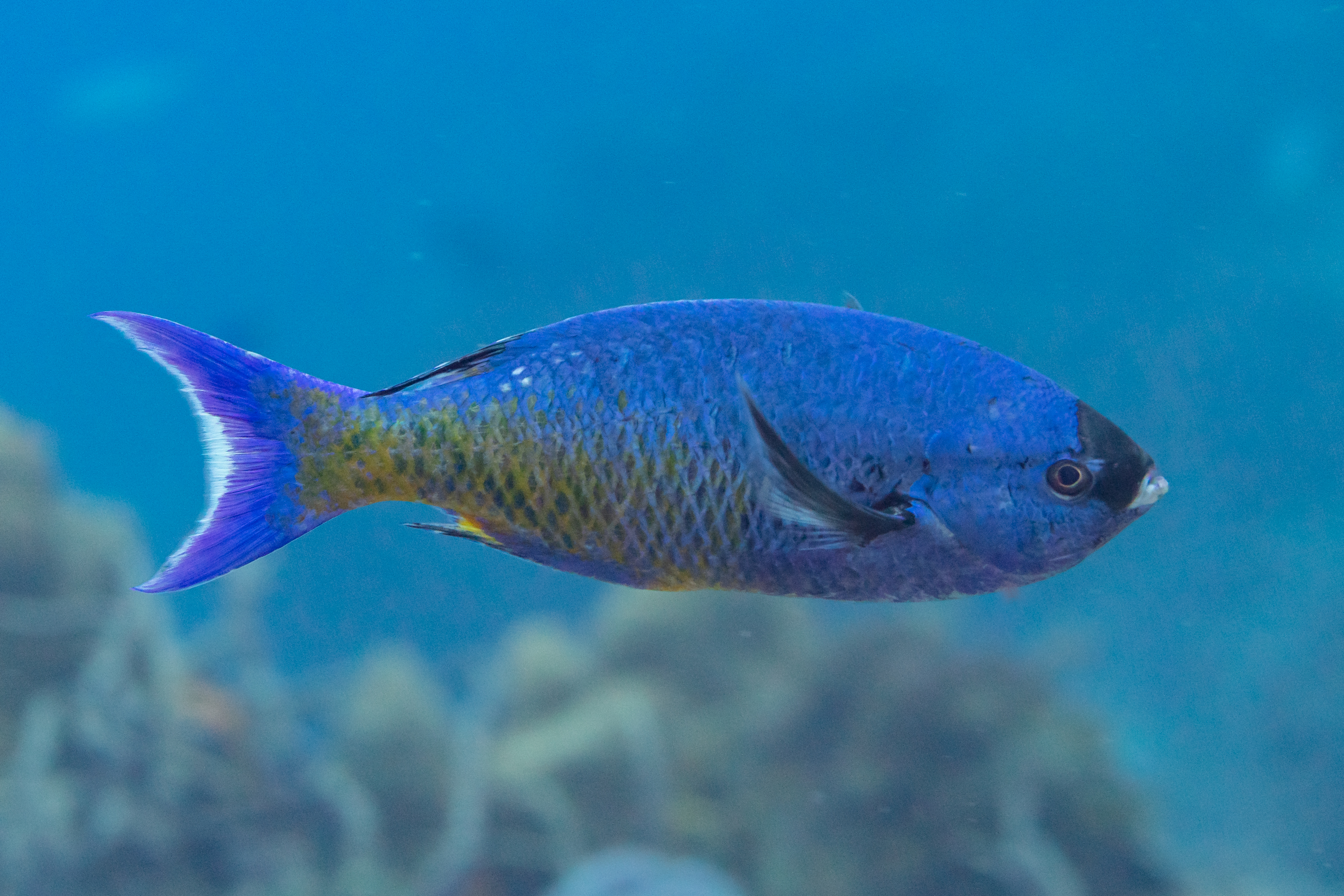
- At Cozumel, México

Conservation status
- Least Concern (IUCN 3.1)

Scientific classification
- Kingdom: Animalia
- Phylum: Chordata
- Class: Actinopterygii
- Division: Teleostei
- Order: Labriformes
- Family: Labridae
- Genus: Bodianus
- Species: B. parrae

Binomial name
- Bodianus parrae (Bloch & J. G. Schneider, 1801)

Synonyms
- Brama parrae Bloch & J. G. Schneider, 1801; Clepticus genizara Cuvier, 1829

= Creole wrasse =

Species of fish

The creole wrasse (Bodianus parrae) is a species of wrasse native to the western Atlantic Ocean.

== Taxonomy ==
The creole wrasse was first formally described in 1801 as Brama parrae by Marcus Elieser Bloch & Johann Gottlob Schneider. In 1829, Georges Cuvier described a species and a new genus, which he named Clepticus genizara; this name was later regarded as a synonym of Bloch and Schneider's earlier name and this species is the type species of the genus Clepticus. It was moved to Bodianus in 2016, and its sister taxon is Bodianus anthioides.

== Description ==
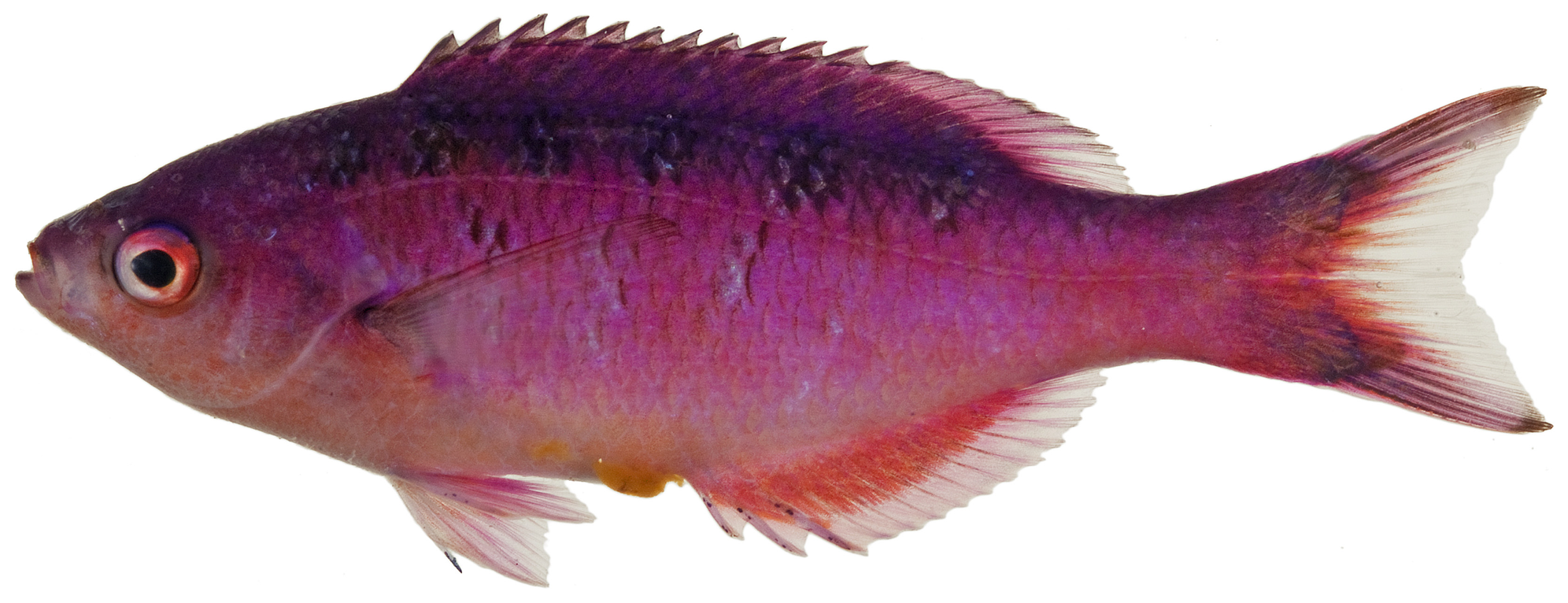
Juvenile, 6 cm SL in length

The creole wrasse is a small wrasse, with males reaching around 30 cm (1 ft) in length, while females are smaller. It has a typical wrasse shape. Like many wrasse, it changes colour markedly during its lifetime, with juveniles being almost completely violet-purple. As it matures, it develops a yellow patch on the rear part of its body.

== Distribution ==
The species is found throughout the tropical waters of the western Atlantic Ocean from Florida to Brazil, including Bermuda Islands, the Caribbean Sea, and the Gulf of Mexico.

== Ecology ==
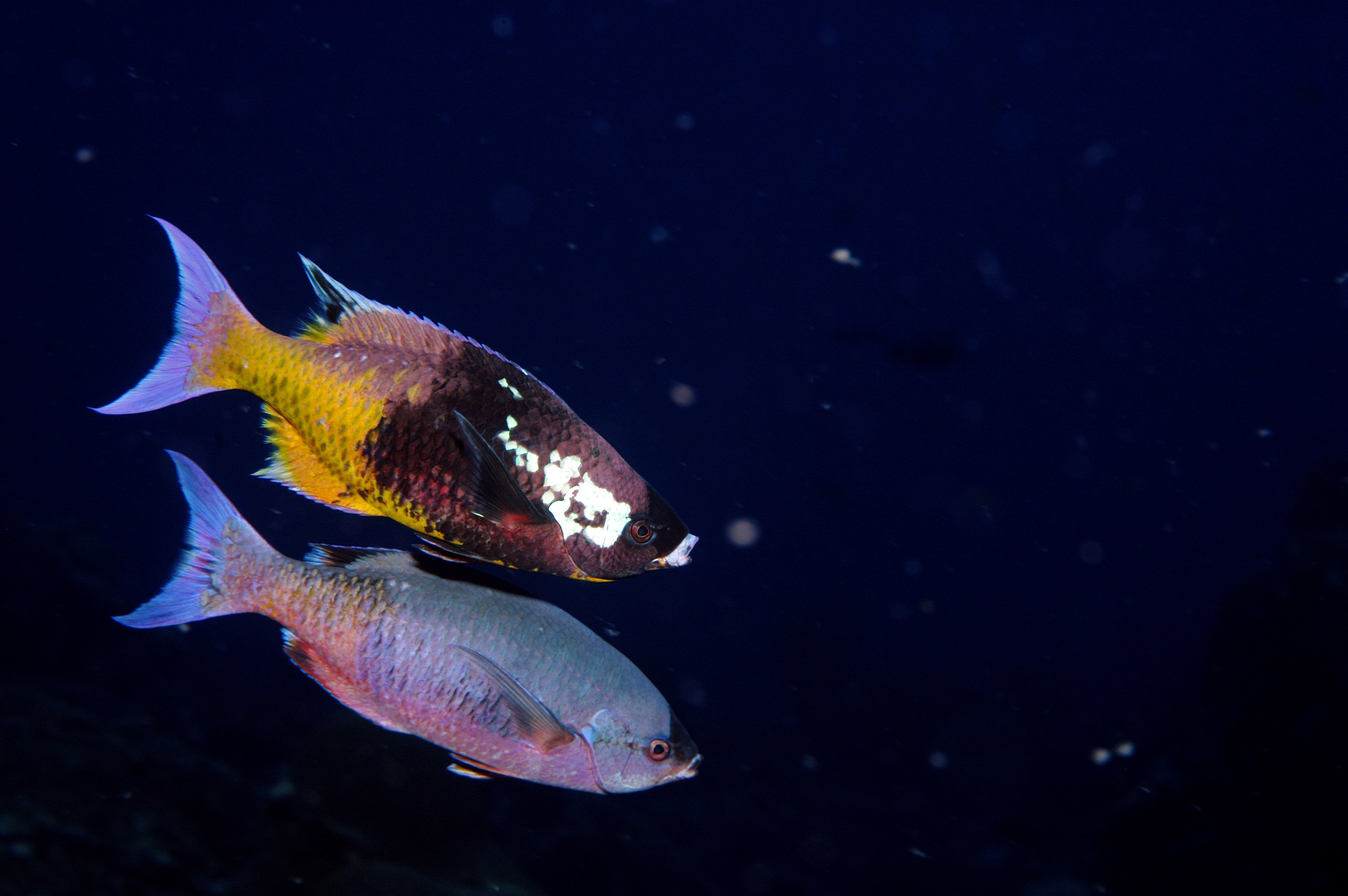
Male (top) and female (bottom)

This wrasse lives in groups, aggregating on coral reef slopes, down to around 100 m (330 ft) in depth. These groups feed on plankton, including small jellyfish, pteropods, pelagic tunicates, and invertebrate larvae. The creole wrasse is active by day, and at night it retreats alone to a rocky crevice in the reef to sleep.

== Reproduction ==
The creole wrasse is a protogynous hermaphrodite; the largest fish in a group is a dominant breeding male, while smaller fish remain female. If the dominant male dies, the largest female changes sex. The mature males congregate at leks to breed, at which they display and are approached by females before mating with them.
