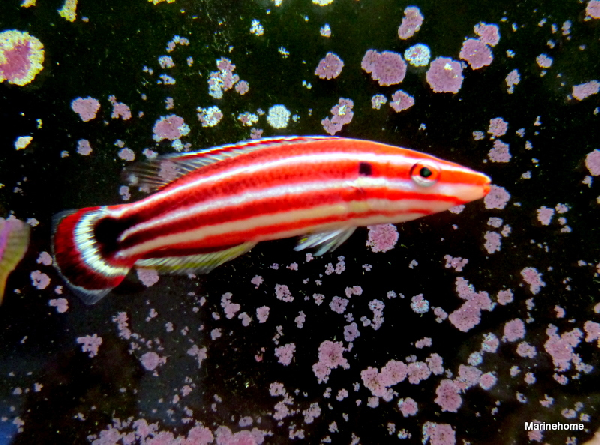

Conservation status
- Data Deficient (IUCN 3.1)

Scientific classification
- Kingdom: Animalia
- Phylum: Chordata
- Class: Actinopterygii
- Order: Labriformes
- Family: Labridae
- Genus: Bodianus
- Species: B. sepiacaudus

Binomial name
- Bodianus sepiacaudus Gomon, 2006

= Crescent-tail hogfish =

Species of fish

The crescent-tail hogfish (Bodianus sepiacaudus), also known as the candy cane hogfish or Pacific redstriped hogfish, is a species of wrasse native to the Pacific Ocean from Sulawesi to the Line Islands. It can be found in groups at depths from 20 to 75 m (66 to 246 ft). This species can reach 8.7 cm (3.4 in) in standard length. Juveniles are white and black. Adults are white with four broad red stripes, suffused with black on caudal peduncle and caudal fin. It can be found in the aquarium trade.

The crescent-tail hogfish differs from Bodianus masudai by having white pelvic fins.
