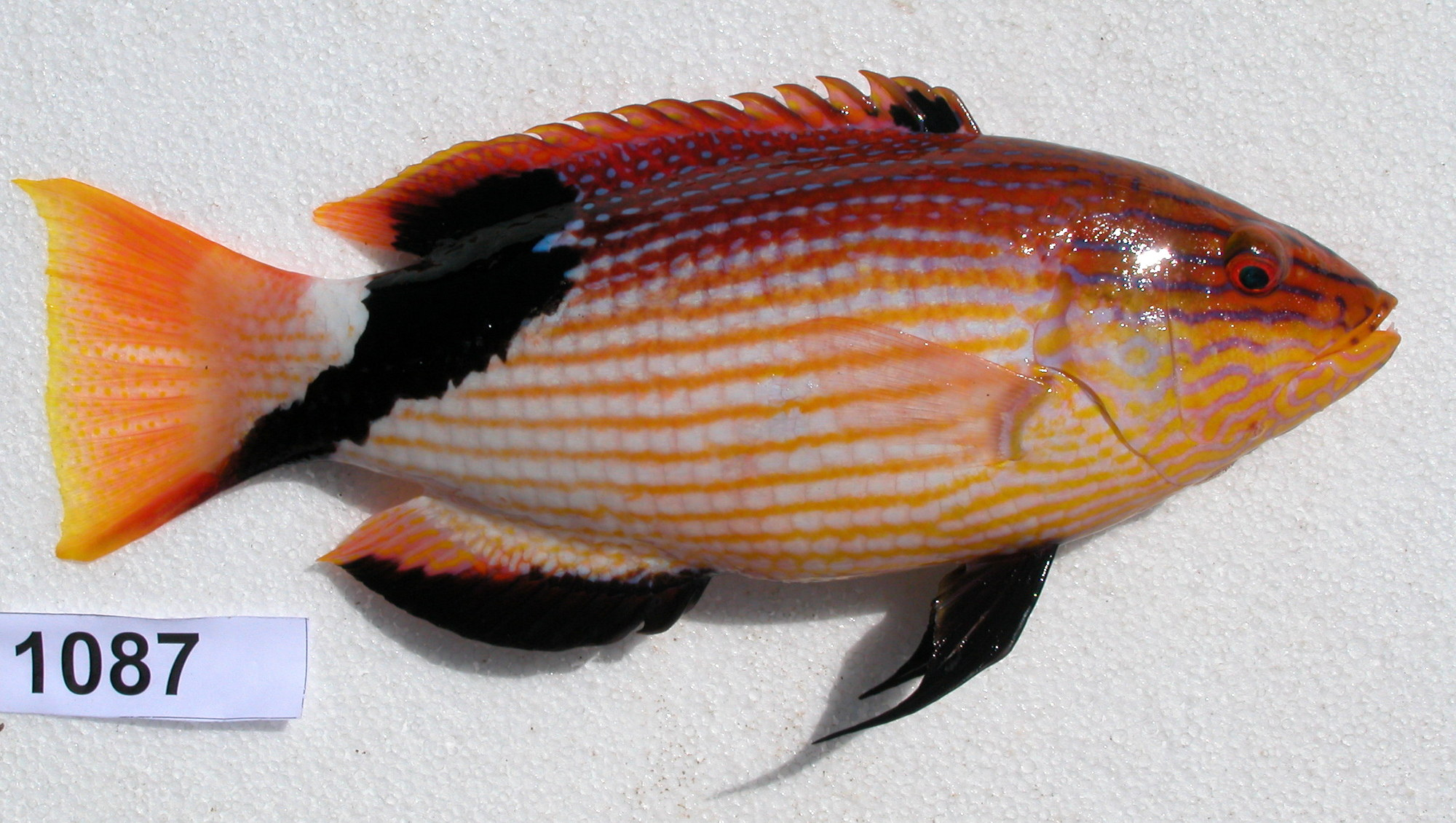

Conservation status
- Least Concern (IUCN 3.1)

Scientific classification
- Kingdom: Animalia
- Phylum: Chordata
- Class: Actinopterygii
- Order: Labriformes
- Family: Labridae
- Genus: Bodianus
- Species: B. loxozonus

Binomial name
- Bodianus loxozonus (Snyder, 1908)

Synonyms
- Lepidaplois loxozonus Snyder, 1908; Bodianus loxozonus loxozonus (Snyder, 1908); Lepidaplois trotteri Fowler & Bean, 1923

= Bodianus loxozonus =

Blackfin hogfish

Species of fish

Bodianus loxozonus, the blackfin hogfish, is a species of wrasse. It is found in the western Pacific Ocean.

== Description ==
This species reaches a length of 47.0 cm (18.5 in).
