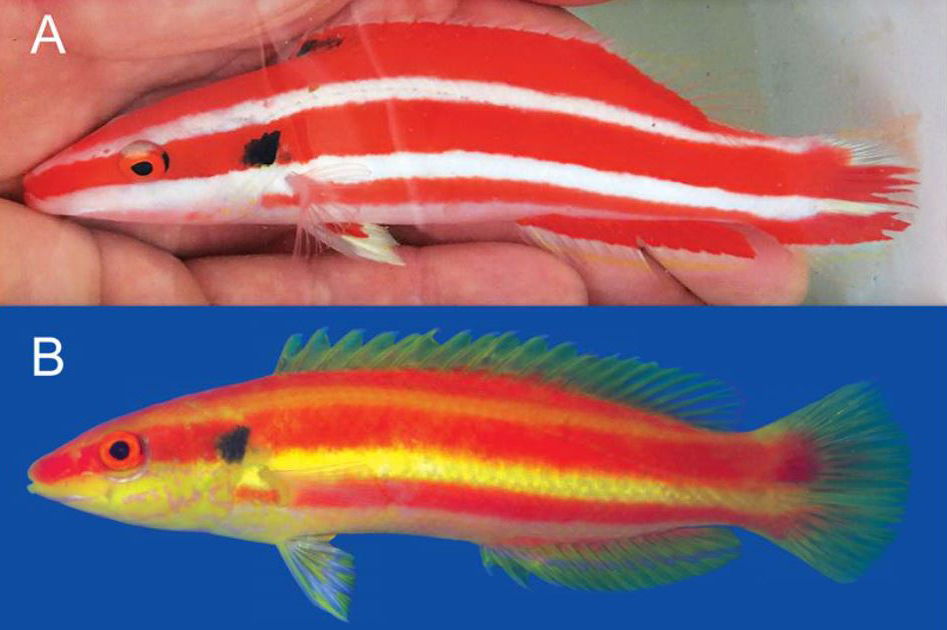
- The holotype of the lemon-striped pygmy hogfish, Bodianus bennetti, from Flora Reef in the Coral Sea off Queensland, depth 97 m - displaying red & white stripes when fresh caught, and the red & yellow colour after a short time in captivity

Scientific classification
- Kingdom: Animalia
- Phylum: Chordata
- Class: Actinopterygii
- Order: Labriformes
- Family: Labridae
- Genus: Bodianus
- Species: B. bennetti

Binomial name
- Bodianus bennetti Gomon & F. Walsh, 2016

= Lemon-striped pygmy hogfish =

Species of fish

The lemon-striped pygmy hogfish (Bodianus bennetti) is a species of ray-finned fish from the family Labridae, the wrasses. This species is found on reefs in the Coral Sea off the coast of Queensland and in French Polynesia.

== Description ==
The lemon-striped pygmy hogfish is a small slender wrasse (?) which has obvious, wide, horizontal red stripes which run from the head along the body in large adults; one strip runs along the back and inner part of the dorsal fin, another from the nose along the flanks ends in a spot on the upper caudal fin peduncle, while a third stripe runs along the lower side and lower part of the anal fin onto the caudal fin. There is a distinct black spot on the operculum. The gaps between the red stripes may be yellow. The body colour and pattern changes with age and mature males in what is known as the terminal-phase are similar to the above description but have a larger and prominent red spot on the upper part of the base of the caudal fin. The largest specimen had a standard length of 10.9 centimetres (4.3 in).

== Distribution ==
The lemon-striped pygmy hogfish is found in the Western Pacific. It has been recorded in the Coral Sea off the northeastern coast of Queensland and off Moorea in French Polynesia.

== Habitat and biology ==
The lemon-striped pygmy hogfish occurs where there are gentle reef slopes over substrates consisting of clean rubble where there is a strong current. It has been filmed using baited remote underwater video on the Great Barrier Reef at depths of 155–179 metres (509–587 ft).

== Etymology ==
The specific name honours the collector of the holotype Timothy Bennett.
