= Bodianus solatus =

Conservation status
- Data Deficient (IUCN 3.1)

Scientific classification
- Kingdom: Animalia
- Phylum: Chordata
- Class: Actinopterygii
- Order: Labriformes
- Family: Labridae
- Genus: Bodianus
- Species: B. solatus

Binomial name
- Bodianus solatus Gomon, 2006

Species of fish

Bodianus solatus, the sunburnt hogfish, is a species of wrasse native to tropical and warm temperate waters of Western Australia. It was formerly considered the western Australian form of the goldspot hogfish (Bodanius perdito).
