= Bodianus trilineatus =

Conservation status
- Least Concern (IUCN 3.1)

Scientific classification
- Kingdom: Animalia
- Phylum: Chordata
- Class: Actinopterygii
- Order: Labriformes
- Family: Labridae
- Genus: Bodianus
- Species: B. trilineatus

Binomial name
- Bodianus trilineatus (Fowler, 1934)

Synonyms
- Lepidaplois trilineatus Fowler, 1934; Lepidaplois luteopunctatus Smith, 1957; Bodianus luteopunctatus (Smith, 1957)

Species of fish

Bodianus trilineatus, the fourline hogfish, is a species of wrasse found in the western Indian Ocean.

== Description ==
This species reaches a length of 28.0 cm (11.0 in).
