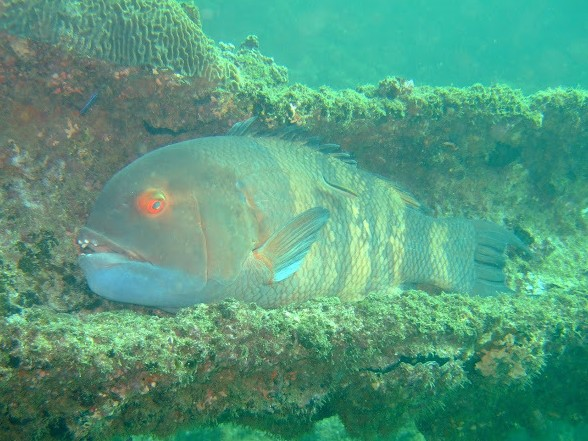

Conservation status
- Least Concern (IUCN 3.1)

Scientific classification
- Kingdom: Animalia
- Phylum: Chordata
- Class: Actinopterygii
- Order: Labriformes
- Family: Labridae
- Genus: Bodianus
- Species: B. macrognathos

Binomial name
- Bodianus macrognathos (R. E. Morris, 1974)

Synonyms
- Lepidaplois macrognathos Morris, 1974

= Bodianus macrognathos =

Species of fish

Bodianus macrognathos, the giant hogfish, is a species of wrasse. It is found in the western Indian Ocean.

== Description ==
This species reaches a length of 62.0 cm (24.4 in).
