= Bodianus tanyokidus =

Conservation status
- Data Deficient (IUCN 3.1)

Scientific classification
- Kingdom: Animalia
- Phylum: Chordata
- Class: Actinopterygii
- Order: Labriformes
- Family: Labridae
- Genus: Bodianus
- Species: B. tanyokidus

Binomial name
- Bodianus tanyokidus Gomon & Madden, 1981

Species of fish

Bodianus tanyokidus is a species of wrasse. It is found in the Indo-West Pacific region, from the Comoro Islands and Mauritius to southern Japan.

== Description ==
This species reaches a length of 17.7 cm (7.0 in).
