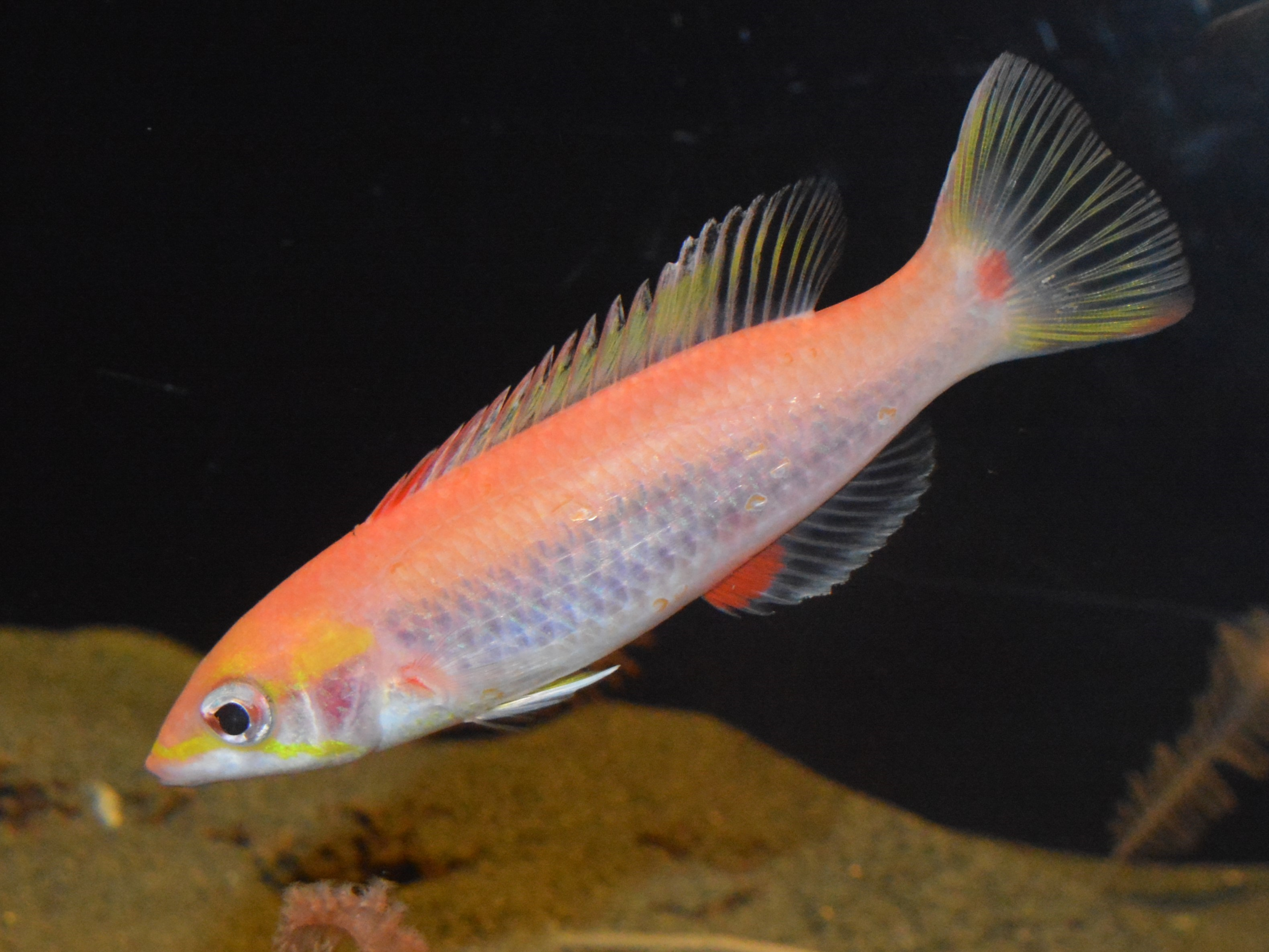

Conservation status
- Least Concern (IUCN 3.1)

Scientific classification
- Kingdom: Animalia
- Phylum: Chordata
- Class: Actinopterygii
- Order: Labriformes
- Family: Labridae
- Genus: Bodianus
- Species: B. cylindriatus

Binomial name
- Bodianus cylindriatus {S. Tanaka (I)), 1930

= Bodianus cylindriatus =

Species of fish

Bodianus cylindriatus is a species of wrasse. It is found in the western Pacific Ocean.

== Description ==
This species reaches a length of 14.2 cm (5.6 in).
