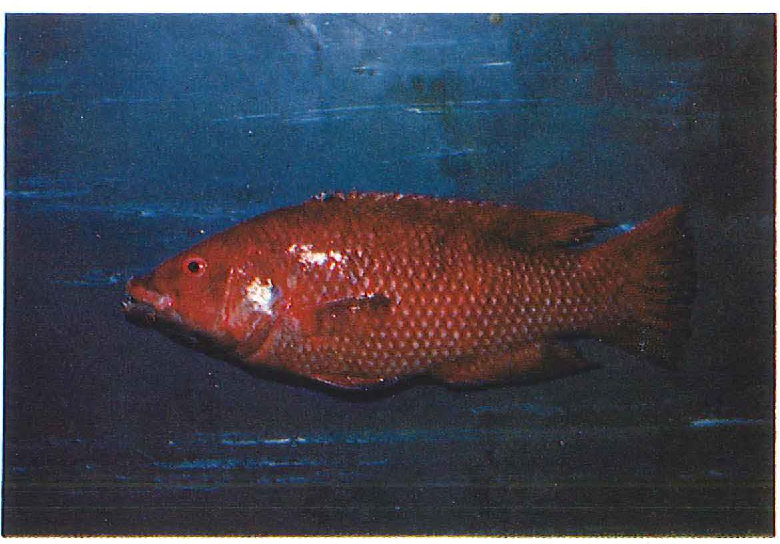

Conservation status
- Least Concern (IUCN 3.1)

Scientific classification
- Kingdom: Animalia
- Phylum: Chordata
- Class: Actinopterygii
- Order: Labriformes
- Family: Labridae
- Genus: Bodianus
- Species: B. insularis

Binomial name
- Bodianus insularis Gomon & Lubbock, 1980

= Bodianus insularis =

Species of fish

Bodianus insularis, the island hogfish, is a species of wrasse found in the eastern Atlantic Ocean.

== Description ==
This species reaches a length of 33.0 cm (13.0 in).
