= Bodianus leucosticticus =

Conservation status
- Least Concern (IUCN 3.1)

Scientific classification
- Kingdom: Animalia
- Phylum: Chordata
- Class: Actinopterygii
- Order: Labriformes
- Family: Labridae
- Genus: Bodianus
- Species: B. leucosticticus

Binomial name
- Bodianus leucosticticus (E. T. Bennett, 1832)

Synonyms
- Labrus leucosticticus Bennett, 1832; Bodianus leucostictus (Bennett, 1832); Lepidaplois bourboni Fourmanoir & Guézé, 1961

Species of fish

Bodianus leucosticticus, the lined hogfish, is a species of wrasse. It is found in the Indo-West Pacific.

== Description ==
This species reaches a length of 24.2 cm (9.5 in).
