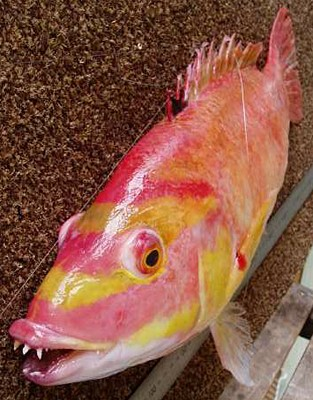

Conservation status
- Least Concern (IUCN 3.1)

Scientific classification
- Kingdom: Animalia
- Phylum: Chordata
- Class: Actinopterygii
- Order: Labriformes
- Family: Labridae
- Genus: Bodianus
- Species: B. flavifrons

Binomial name
- Bodianus flavifrons Gomon, 2001

= Bodianus flavifrons =

Species of fish

Bodianus flavifrons, the masked pigfish, is a species of wrasse found in the south-western Pacific Ocean.

== Description ==
This species reaches a length of 42.2 cm (16.6 in).
