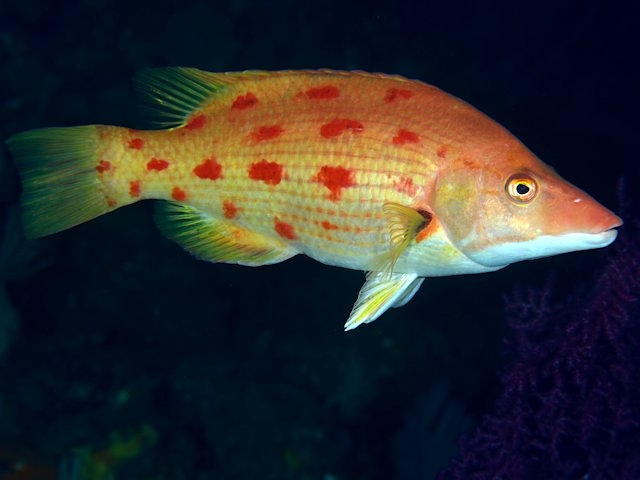

Conservation status
- Data Deficient (IUCN 3.1)

Scientific classification
- Kingdom: Animalia
- Phylum: Chordata
- Class: Actinopterygii
- Order: Labriformes
- Family: Labridae
- Genus: Bodianus
- Species: B. oxycephalus

Binomial name
- Bodianus oxycephalus (Bleeker, 1862)

Synonyms
- Cossyphus oxycephalus Bleeker, 1862

= Bodianus oxycephalus =

Species of fish

Bodianus oxycephalus is a species of wrasse found in the north-western Pacific Ocean.

== Description ==
This species reaches a length of 29.0 cm (11.4 in).
