= Bodianus paraleucosticticus =

Conservation status
- Data Deficient (IUCN 3.1)

Scientific classification
- Kingdom: Animalia
- Phylum: Chordata
- Class: Actinopterygii
- Order: Labriformes
- Family: Labridae
- Genus: Bodianus
- Species: B. paraleucosticticus

Binomial name
- Bodianus paraleucosticticus Gomon, 2006

Species of fish

Bodianus paraleucosticticus, the five-striped hogfish, is a species of wrasse native to tropical and warm temperate waters of the Indo-West Pacific, particularly Papua New Guinea, New Caledonia and Rarotonga. It has also been recorded at Holmes Reef in the Coral Sea off Queensland. The specific name is a compound of para meaning "near" with leucostictus meaning "white-spotted" referring to the close relationship of this species with Bodianus leucostictus.
