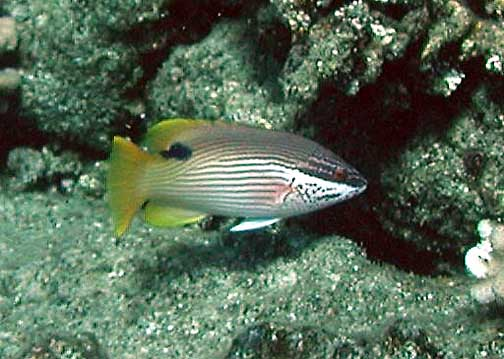

Conservation status
- Least Concern (IUCN 3.1)

Scientific classification
- Kingdom: Animalia
- Phylum: Chordata
- Class: Actinopterygii
- Order: Labriformes
- Family: Labridae
- Genus: Bodianus
- Species: B. albotaeniatus

Binomial name
- Bodianus albotaeniatus (Valenciennes, 1839)

Synonyms
- List: Cossyphus albotaeniatus (Valenciennes, 1839); Cossyphus albo-taeniatus (Valenciennes, 1839); Crenilabrus modestus (Garrett, 1864); Lepidaplois atrorubens (Jordan, 1925); Lepidaplois richardsoni (Fowler, 1908); Lepidaplois strophodes (Jordan & Evermann, 1903)

= Bodianus albotaeniatus =

Species of fish

Bodianus albotaeniatus, the Hawaiian hogfish, is a species of wrasse native to the Hawaiian Islands. This species occurs on reef slopes at depths of from 3 to 160 m (9.8 to 524.9 ft) with the adults being found in deeper waters than the juveniles. This species can reach 55 cm (22 in) in total length with a maximum recorded weight of 1.8 kg (4.0 lb). It is of minor importance to local commercial fisheries and is also popular as a game fish. It can also be found in the aquarium trade.

Although considered a subspecies of Bodianus bilunulatus in the past, it is now treated as a distinct species in its own right.
