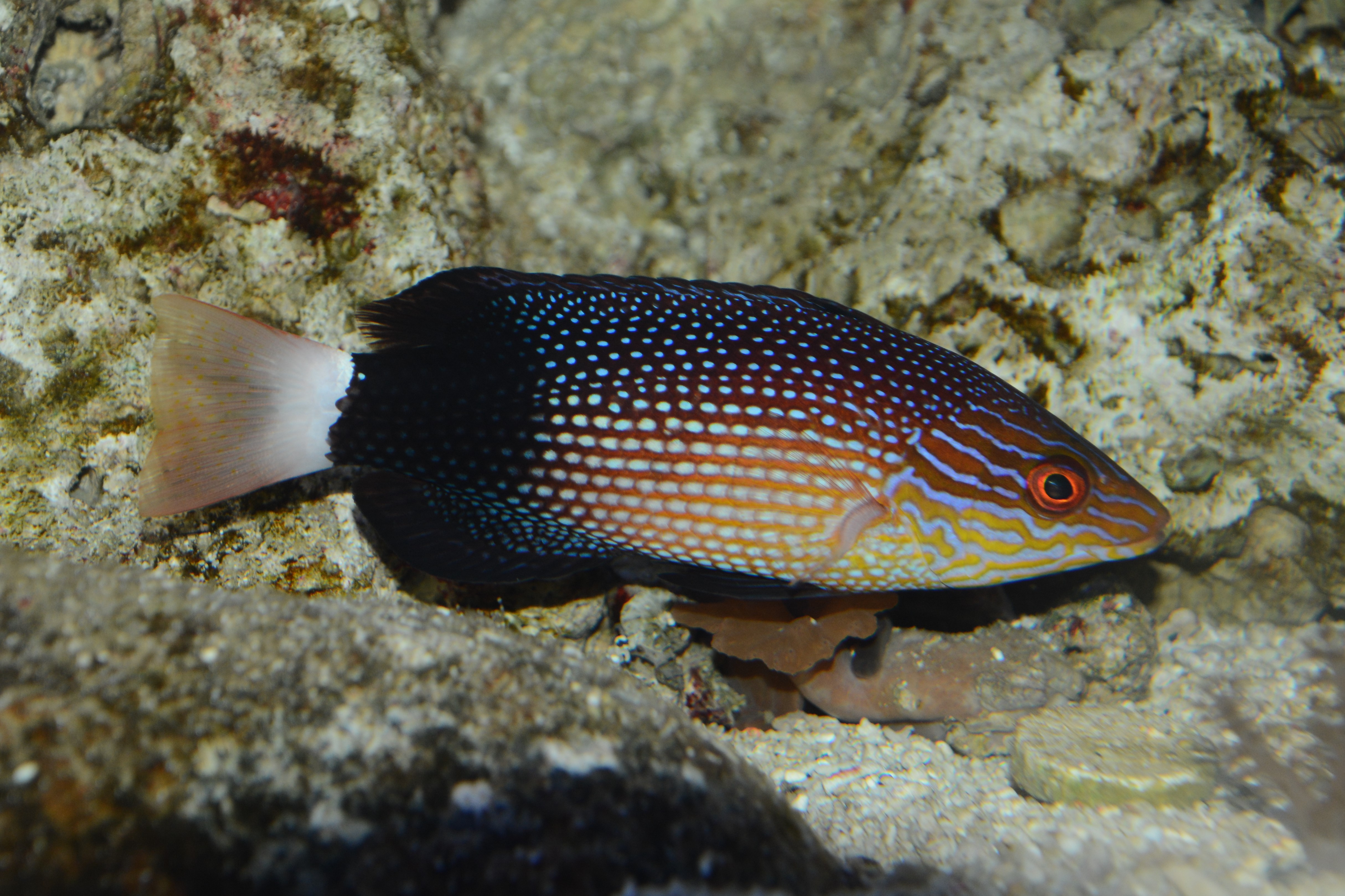
- Bodianus macrourus in Zoo Duisburg

Conservation status
- Least Concern (IUCN 3.1)

Scientific classification
- Kingdom: Animalia
- Phylum: Chordata
- Class: Actinopterygii
- Division: Teleostei
- Order: Labriformes
- Family: Labridae
- Genus: Bodianus
- Species: B. macrourus

Binomial name
- Bodianus macrourus (Lacépède, 1801)

Synonyms
- Labrus macrourus (Lacepède, 1801); Lepidaplois hirsutus (Lacépède, 1801); Labrus hirsutus (Lacepède, 1801); Labrus rubrolineatus (Lacepède, 1801); Crenilabrus croceus (Lesson, 1828); Crenilabrus chabrolii (Lesson, 1831); Labrus spilonotus (Bennett, 1836); Cossyphus maldat (Valenciennes, 1839); Cossyphus macrurus (Günther, 1862)

= Bodianus macrourus =

Species of fish

The Black-banded hogfish (Bodianus macrourus) is a species of wrasse from the genus Bodianus. It is restricted to a small area in the Western Indian Ocean. The only known locations are Mauritius, Réunion and St. Brandon, where it occurs near tropical reefs at a depth of 10-40 meters below surface.

The species reaches a length of 32 cm. Because of the limited range in the wild, it occurs only rarely in the fish trade.
