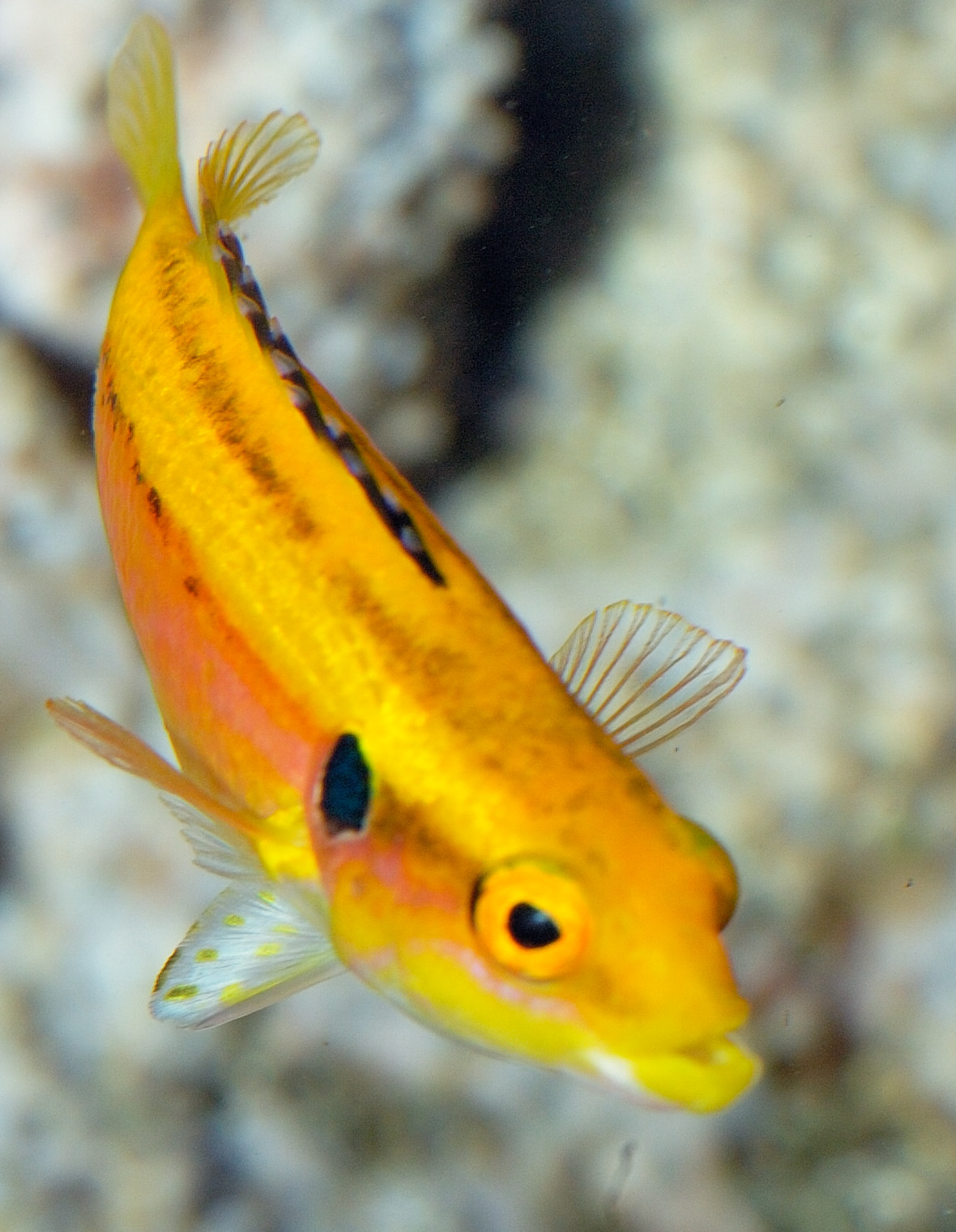

Conservation status
- Least Concern (IUCN 3.1)

Scientific classification
- Kingdom: Animalia
- Phylum: Chordata
- Class: Actinopterygii
- Order: Labriformes
- Family: Labridae
- Genus: Bodianus
- Species: B. bimaculatus

Binomial name
- Bodianus bimaculatus G. R. Allen, 1973

= Twospot hogfish =

Species of fish

The twospot hogfish (Bodianus bimaculatus) is a species of wrasse native to the Indo-Pacific from Madagascar to New Caledonia and from Japan to New Zealand. This species prefers areas of reefs with substrates of rubble or sand at depths from 30 to 60 m (98 to 197 ft). This species can reach a length of 10 cm (3.9 in). It can be found in the aquarium trade.
