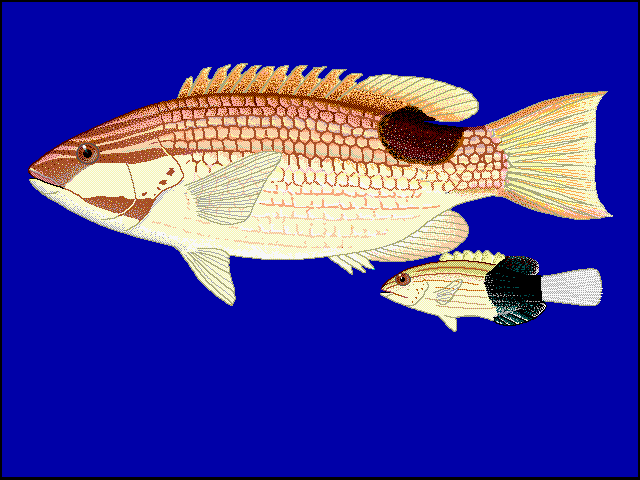

Conservation status
- Least Concern (IUCN 3.1)

Scientific classification
- Kingdom: Animalia
- Phylum: Chordata
- Class: Actinopterygii
- Order: Labriformes
- Family: Labridae
- Genus: Bodianus
- Species: B. bilunulatus

Binomial name
- Bodianus bilunulatus (Lacépède, 1801)

Synonyms
- Labrus bilunulatus Lacépède, 1801; Bodianus bilunulatus bilunulatus (Lacépède, 1801); Lepidaplois bilunulatus (Lacépède, 1801)

= Bodianus bilunulatus =

Species of fish

Bodianus bilunulatus, the tarry hogfish, is a species of wrasse native to the Indian Ocean from the African coast to the western Pacific Ocean to Japan, New Caledonia, and the Philippines.

== Habitat ==
This species occurs on reef slopes at depths of from 3 to 160 m (9.8 to 524.9 ft) with the adults being found in deeper waters than the juveniles. This species can reach 55 cm (22 in) in total length with a maximum recorded weight of 1.8 kg (4.0 lb). It is of minor importance to local commercial fisheries and is also popular as a game fish. It can also be found in the aquarium trade. Other common names include: blackspot wrasse, crescent-banded hogfish, saddle-back hogfish, table boss, and tuxedo hogfish.

== Taxonomy ==
The Hawaiian population of this species has been recently elevated to full species status based on some minor coloration differences, as Bodianus albotaeniatus.
