= Bodianus vulpinus =

Conservation status
- Least Concern (IUCN 3.1)

Scientific classification
- Kingdom: Animalia
- Phylum: Chordata
- Class: Actinopterygii
- Order: Labriformes
- Family: Labridae
- Genus: Bodianus
- Species: B. vulpinus

Binomial name
- Bodianus vulpinus (Richardson, 1850)

Synonyms
- Cossyphus vulpinus Richardson, 1850

Species of fish

Bodianus vulpinus, the western pigfish, is a species of wrasse native to tropical and warm temperate waters of the Pacific Ocean, namely Western Australia.

== Taxonomy ==
Bodianus vulpinus is placed in the subgenus Verreo in Bodianus. The record of B. vulpinus from the Hawaiian Islands by some authors was eventually recognized as a distinct species, Bodianus bathycapros.
