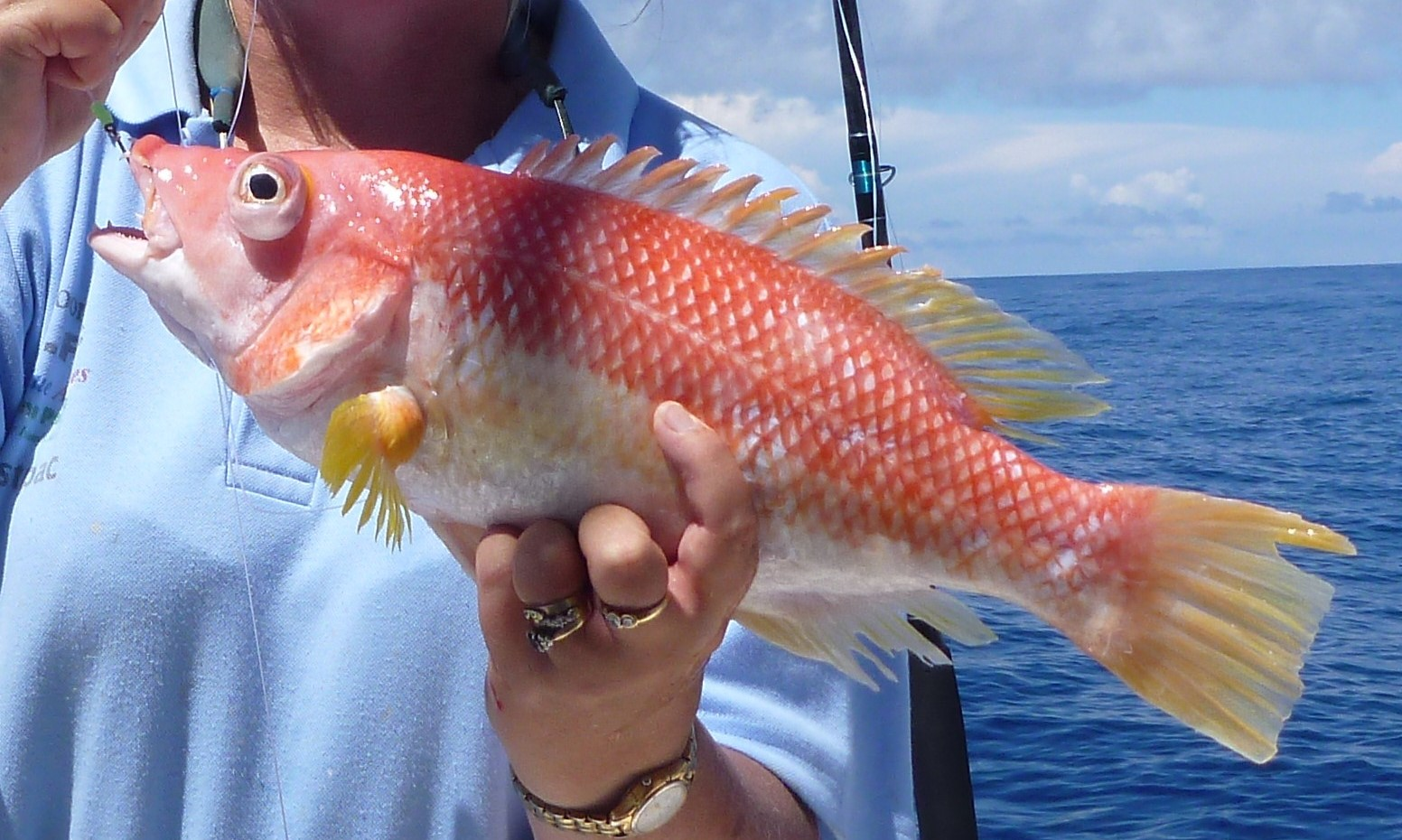

Conservation status
- Data Deficient (IUCN 3.1)

Scientific classification
- Kingdom: Animalia
- Phylum: Chordata
- Class: Actinopterygii
- Order: Labriformes
- Family: Labridae
- Genus: Bodianus
- Species: B. flavipinnis

Binomial name
- Bodianus flavipinnis Gomon, 2001

= Bodianus flavipinnis =

Species of fish

Bodianus flavipinnis, the yellowfin pigfish, is a species of wrasse that is found in the south-western Pacific Ocean.

== Description ==
This species can reach a length of up to 36.8 cm (14.5 in).
