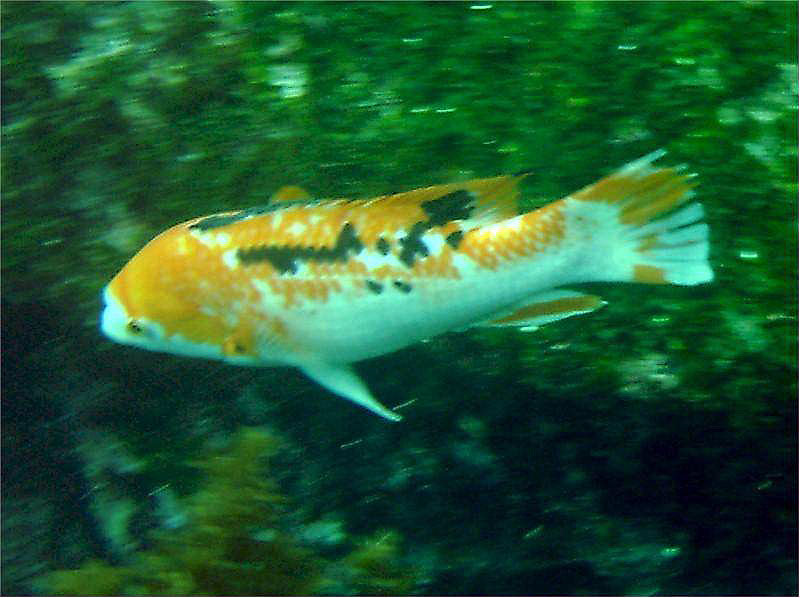

Conservation status
- Least Concern (IUCN 3.1)

Scientific classification
- Kingdom: Animalia
- Phylum: Chordata
- Class: Actinopterygii
- Order: Labriformes
- Family: Labridae
- Genus: Bodianus
- Species: B. eclancheri

Binomial name
- Bodianus eclancheri (Valenciennes, 1846)

= Bodianus eclancheri =

Species of fish

Bodianus eclancheri, commonly known as the harlequin wrasse, is a species of wrasse. It is found in the south-eastern Pacific Ocean.

== Etymology ==
The fish is named in honor of Charles René Augustin L'Eclancher (also spelled Léclancher, 1804–1857), the naval surgeon aboard La Vénus, from which the type specimen was collected.

== Description ==
This species reaches a length of 61.0 cm (24.0 in).
