= Bodianus prognathus =

Conservation status
- Least Concern (IUCN 3.1)

Scientific classification
- Kingdom: Animalia
- Phylum: Chordata
- Class: Actinopterygii
- Order: Labriformes
- Family: Labridae
- Genus: Bodianus
- Species: B. prognathus

Binomial name
- Bodianus prognathus Lobel, 1981

Species of fish

Bodianus prognathus is a species of wrasse. It is found in the eastern-central Pacific Ocean.

== Description ==
This species reaches a length of 17.9 cm (7.0 in).
