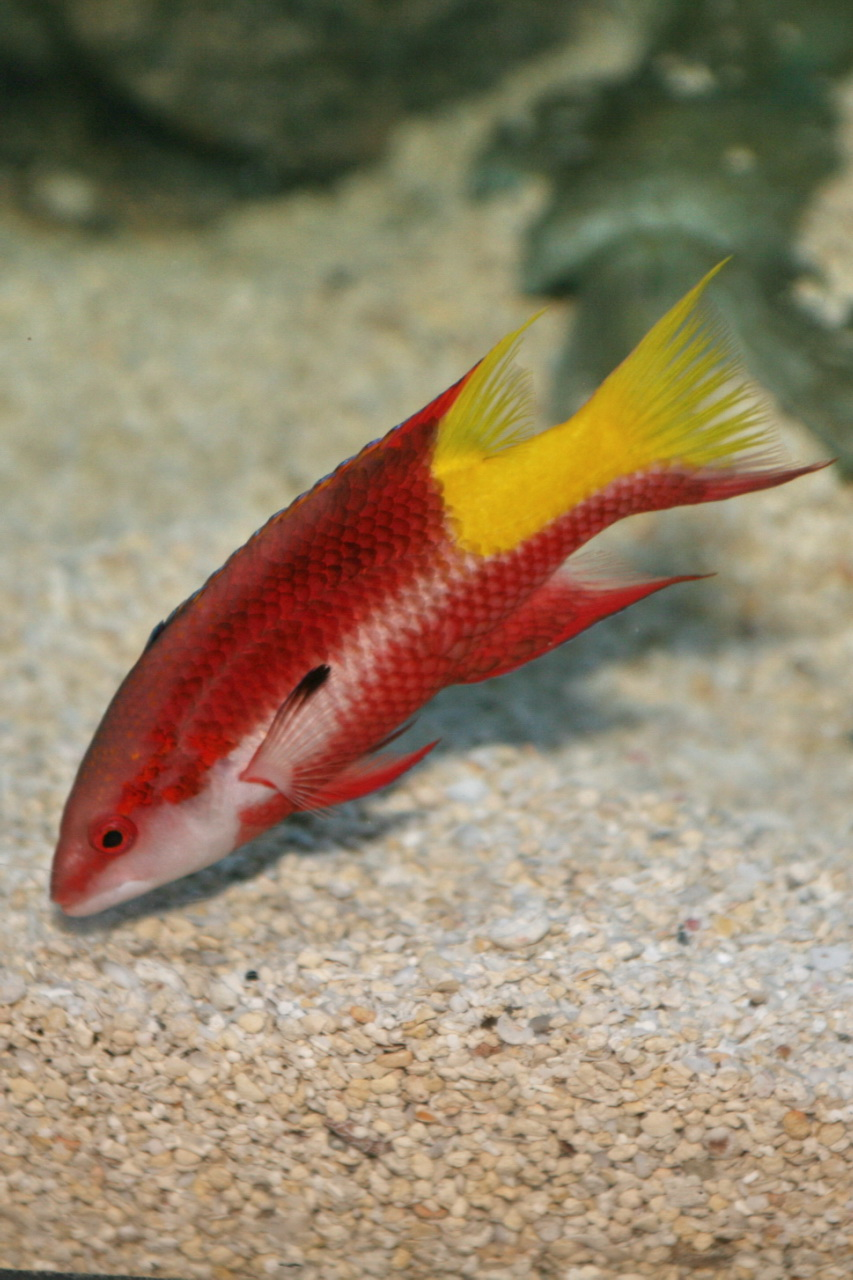

Conservation status
- Least Concern (IUCN 3.1)

Scientific classification
- Kingdom: Animalia
- Phylum: Chordata
- Class: Actinopterygii
- Order: Labriformes
- Family: Labridae
- Genus: Bodianus
- Species: B. pulchellus

Binomial name
- Bodianus pulchellus (Poey, 1860)

Synonyms
- Cossyphus pulchellus Poey, 1860

= Spotfin hogfish =

Species of fish

The spotfin hogfish or Cuban hogfish (Bodianus pulchellus) is a species of wrasse native to the Atlantic Ocean, where it is mainly found from North Carolina to Brazil, through the Caribbean. It has also been recorded from São Tomé off the coast of West Africa. This species inhabits reefs, both rock and coral, where it occurs at depths of 15 to 120 m (49 to 394 ft) though rarely deeper than 24 m (79 ft). It is of minor importance to local commercial fisheries and can be found in the aquarium trade.

== Description ==
Juveniles are bright yellow, a large black blotch covering first 4 spines of the dorsal fin. Adults are very different: the head, body and the pelvic, anal and (the front of the) dorsal fins are deep red, as are the lower part of the caudal peduncle and the lower caudal fin edge. The rear of the dorsal fin, the upper part of the caudal peduncle and the upper caudal fin edge, in contrast, are bright yellow. There is, in addition, an indistinct white stripe extending from the mouth to mid-body, and the tip of the dorsal fin is dark. This species can reach a length of 28.5 cm (11.2 in), though most specimens do not exceed 18 cm (7.1 in).

== Gallery ==
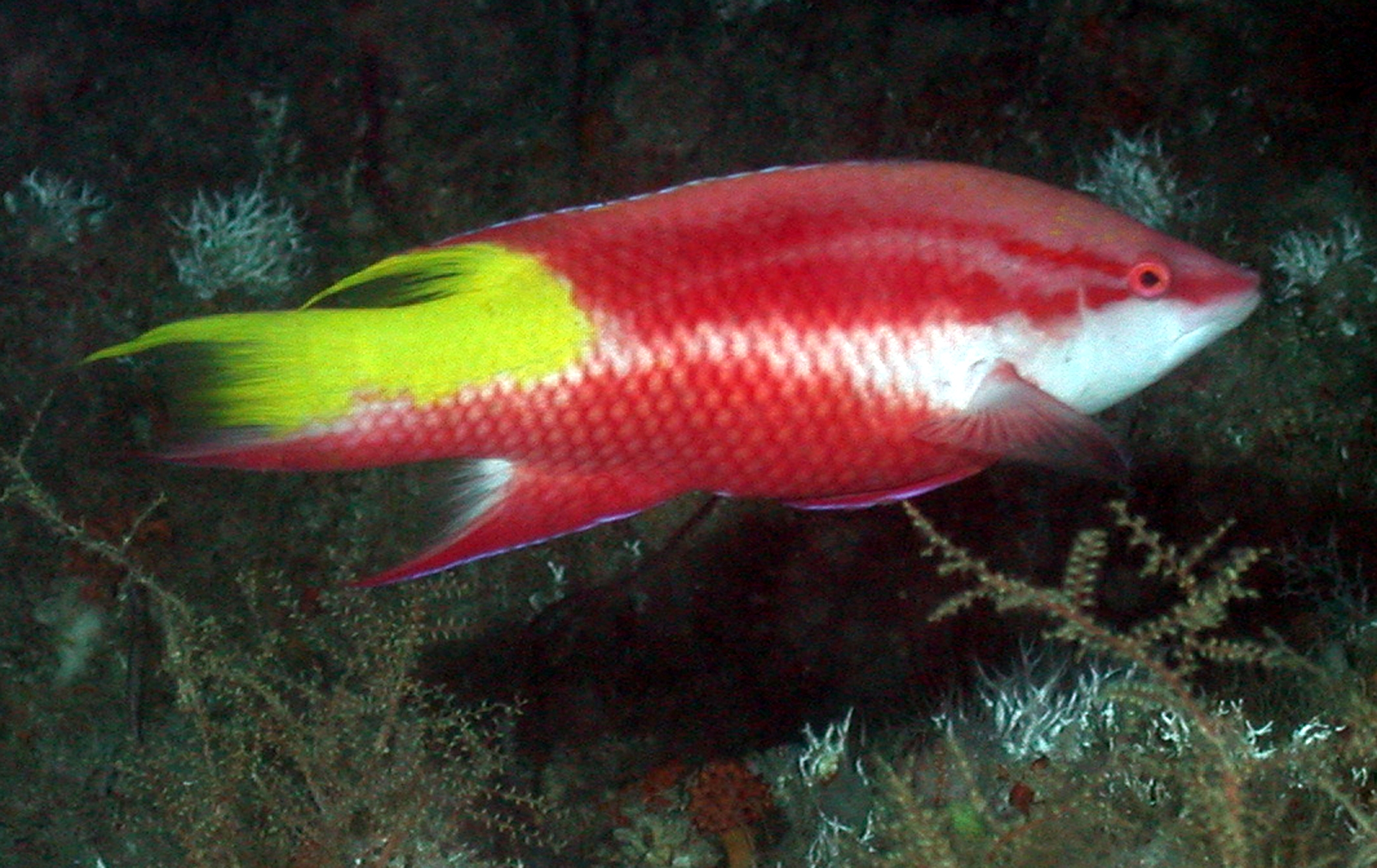

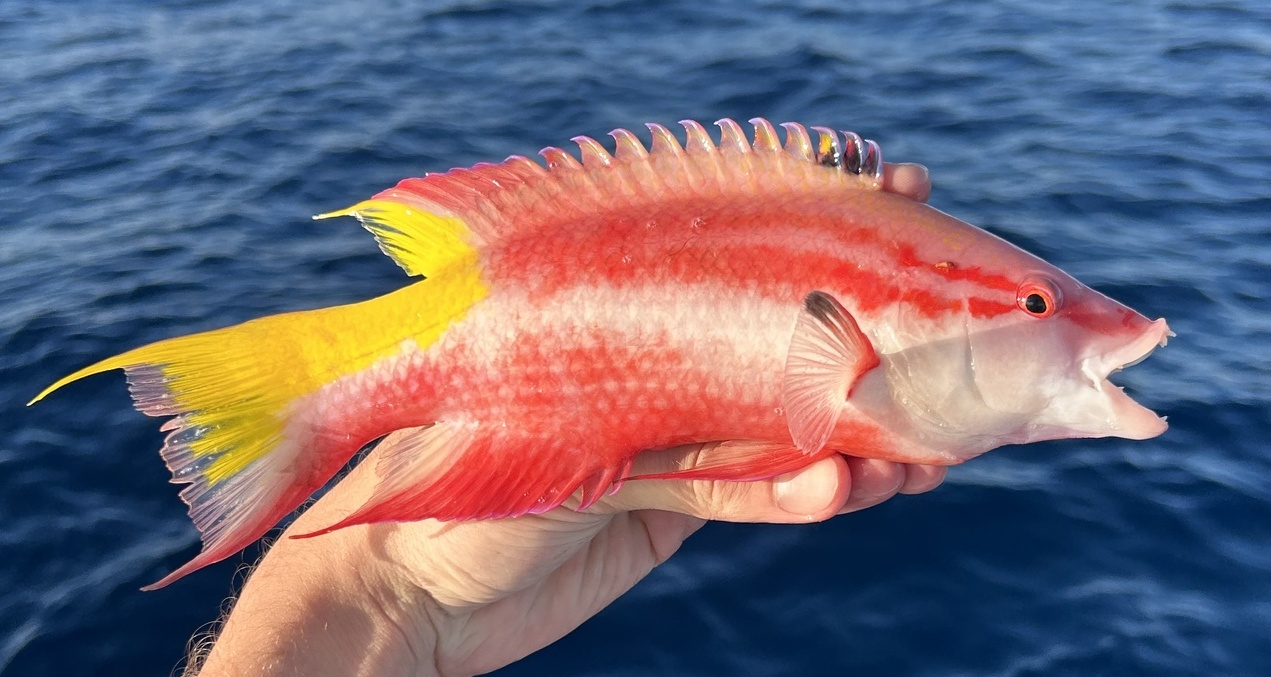
With fins extended

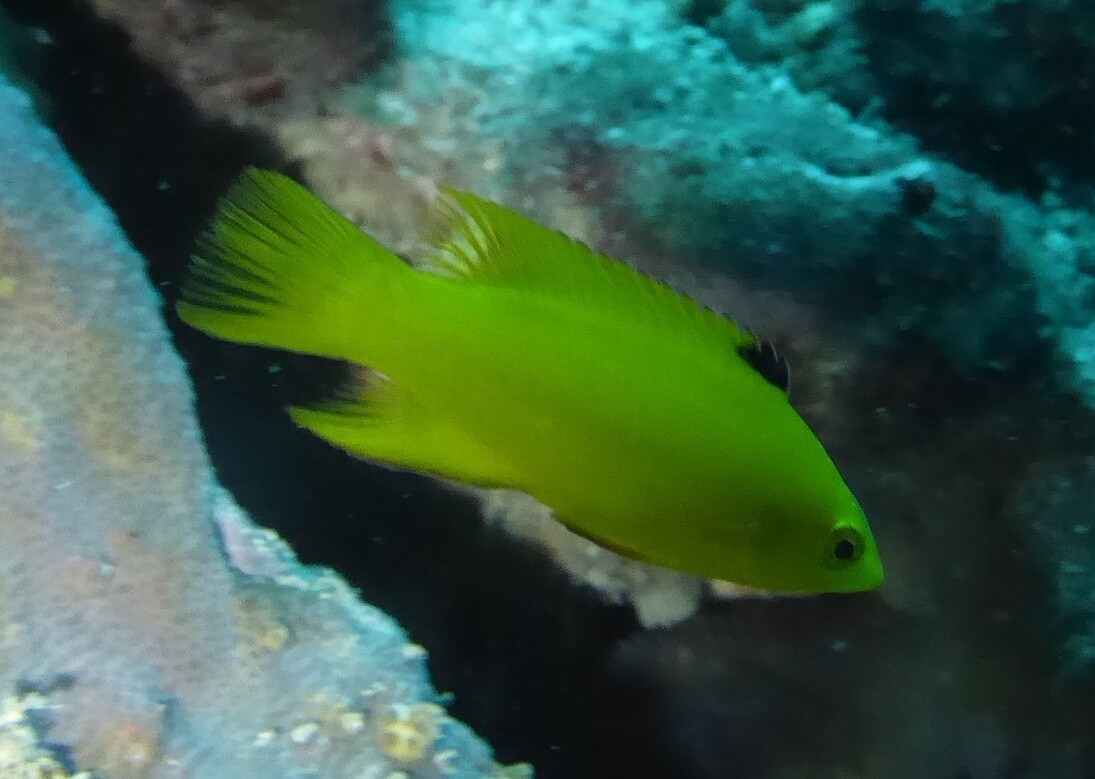
Juvenile

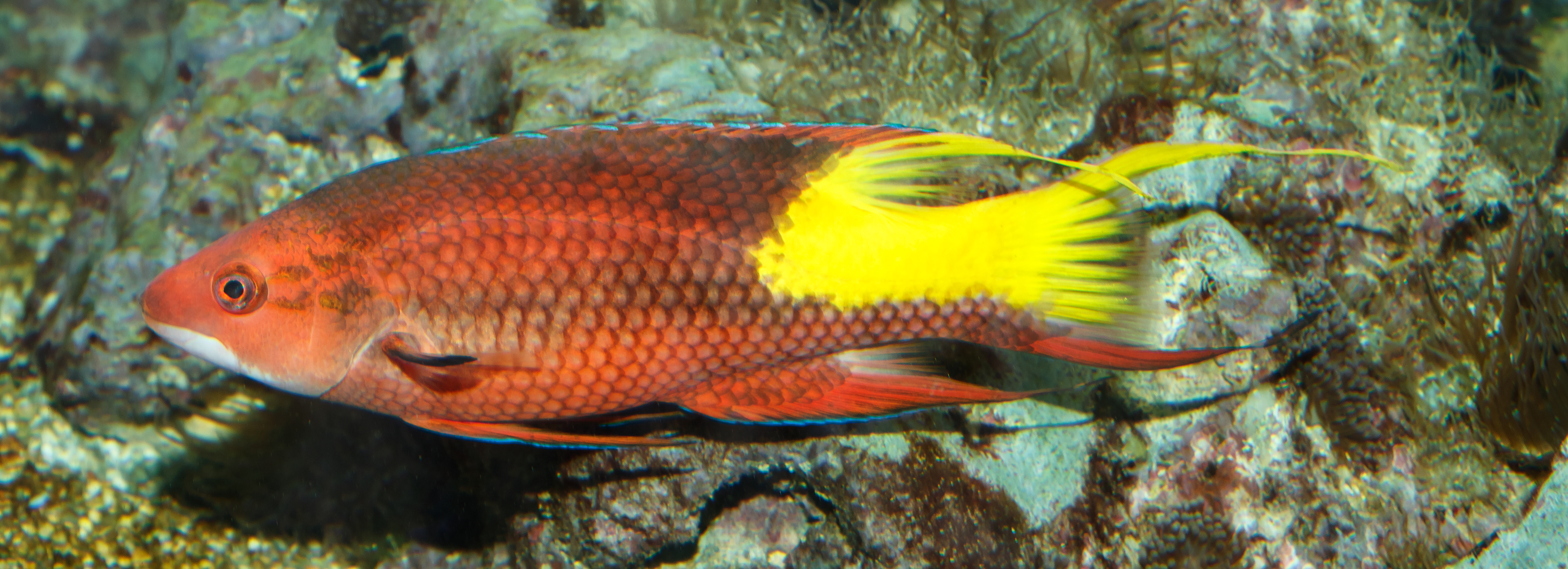
