= Bodianus rubrisos =

Conservation status
- Data Deficient (IUCN 3.1)

Scientific classification
- Kingdom: Animalia
- Phylum: Chordata
- Class: Actinopterygii
- Order: Labriformes
- Family: Labridae
- Genus: Bodianus
- Species: B. rubrisos

Binomial name
- Bodianus rubrisos Gomon, 2006

Species of fish

Bodianus rubrisos, the red-sashed hogfish or morsecode pigfish, is a species of wrasse native to tropical and warm temperate waters of the Indo-West Pacific, particularly Japan, Taiwan and Indonesia. It has been recorded off Australia at Scott Reef in Western Australia and in the Arafura Sea off the Northern Territory.

== Etymology ==
The specific name is a compound of the Latin rubri meaning "red" and the letters s, o and s, a reference to the dot and dash morse code like colour pattern which is distinctive for this species.
