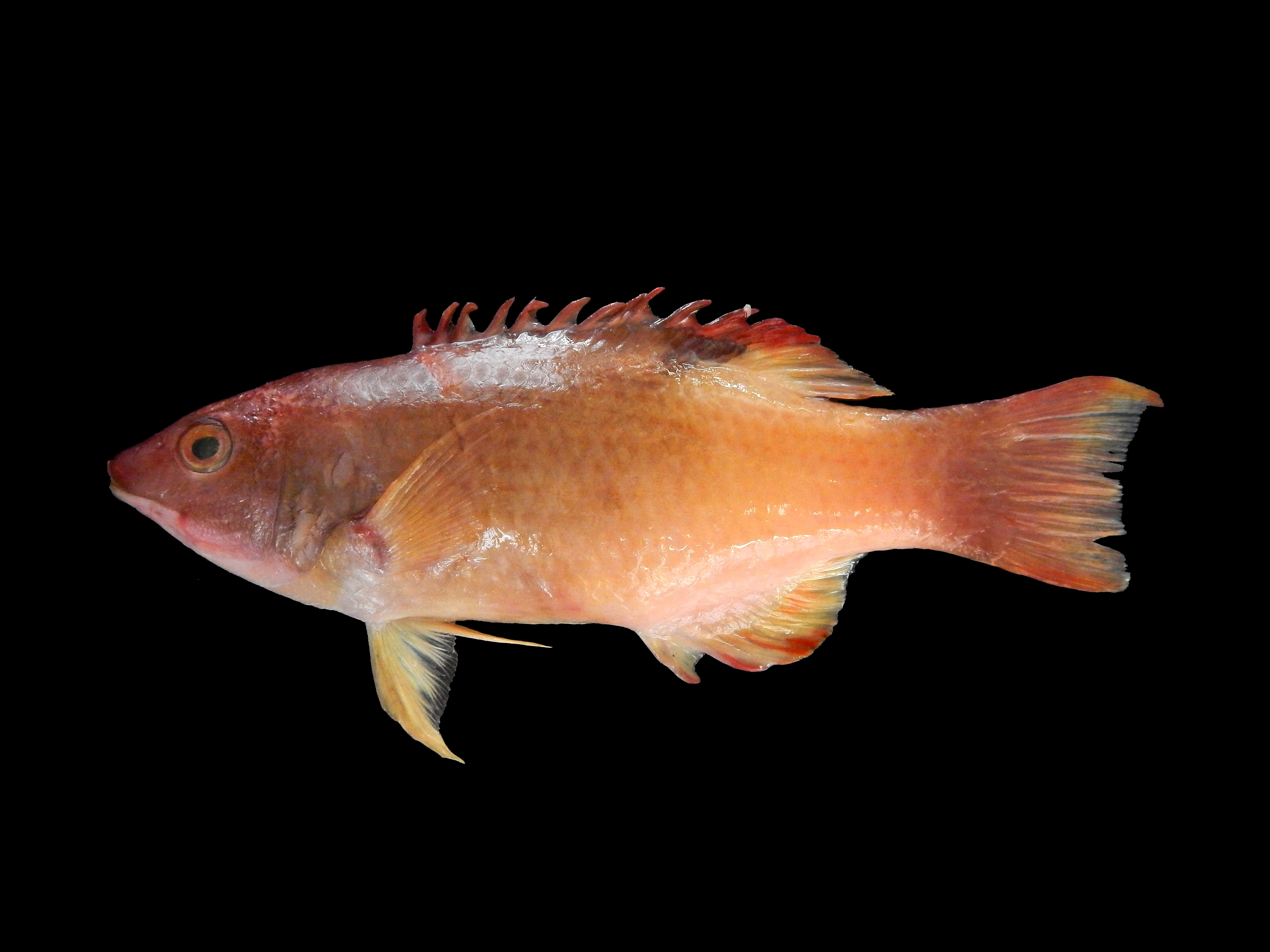

Conservation status
- Least Concern (IUCN 3.1)

Scientific classification
- Kingdom: Animalia
- Phylum: Chordata
- Class: Actinopterygii
- Order: Labriformes
- Family: Labridae
- Genus: Bodianus
- Species: B. neilli

Binomial name
- Bodianus neilli (F. Day, 1867)

Synonyms
- Cossyphus neilli Day, 1867

= Bodianus neilli =

Species of wrasse in the family Labridae

Bodianus neilli, the Bay of Bengal hogfish, is a species of ray-finned fish in the wrasse family Labridae. It is found in the Indian Ocean, in reefs off the coasts of the Maldives (doubtful records only), Sri Lanka, India, Myanmar and Thailand. It may reach 20 cm in total length, and is found at depths of 5 to 30 m (usually occurring between 10 and 30 m).

== Etymology ==
Bodianus neilli was described as Cossyphus neilli in 1867 by Francis Day with the type locality given as Madras, and the specific name honours Day's friend, physician A. G. Brisbane Neill.
