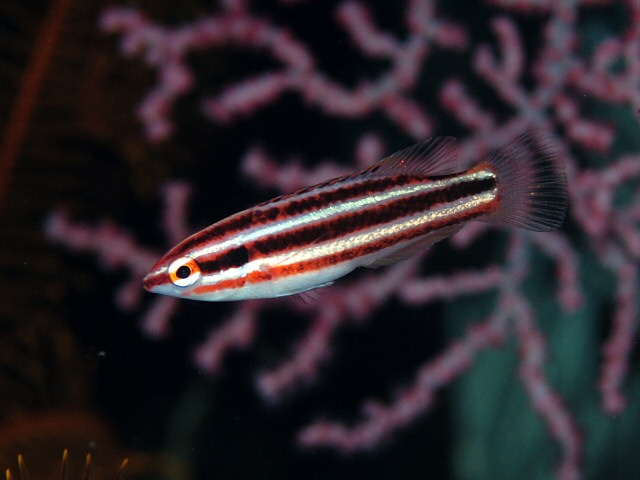

Conservation status
- Data Deficient (IUCN 3.1)

Scientific classification
- Kingdom: Animalia
- Phylum: Chordata
- Class: Actinopterygii
- Order: Labriformes
- Family: Labridae
- Genus: Bodianus
- Species: B. izuensis

Binomial name
- Bodianus izuensis Araga & Yoshino, 1975

= Bodianus izuensis =

Species of fish

Bodianus izuensis, the striped pigfish, is a species of wrasse found in the western Pacific Ocean.

== Description ==
This species reaches a length of 10.0 cm (3.9 in).
