= Bodianus thoracotaeniatus =

Conservation status
- Data Deficient (IUCN 3.1)

Scientific classification
- Kingdom: Animalia
- Phylum: Chordata
- Class: Actinopterygii
- Order: Labriformes
- Family: Labridae
- Genus: Bodianus
- Species: B. thoracotaeniatus

Binomial name
- Bodianus thoracotaeniatus Yamamoto, 1982

Species of fish

Bodianus thoracotaeniatus is a species of wrasse found in the north-western Pacific Ocean.

== Description ==
This species reaches a length of 14.8 cm (5.8 in).
