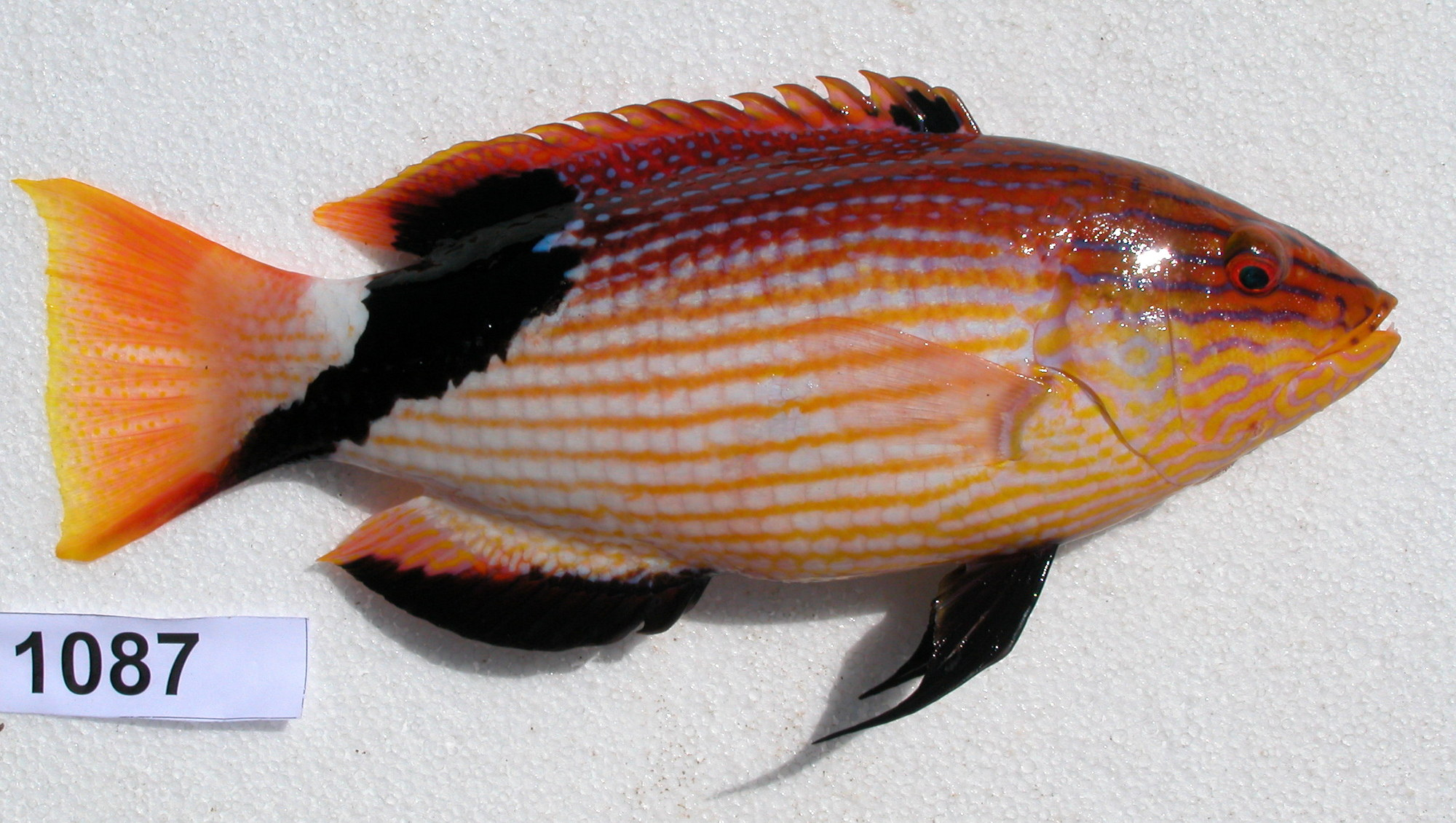
- Bodianus loxozonus
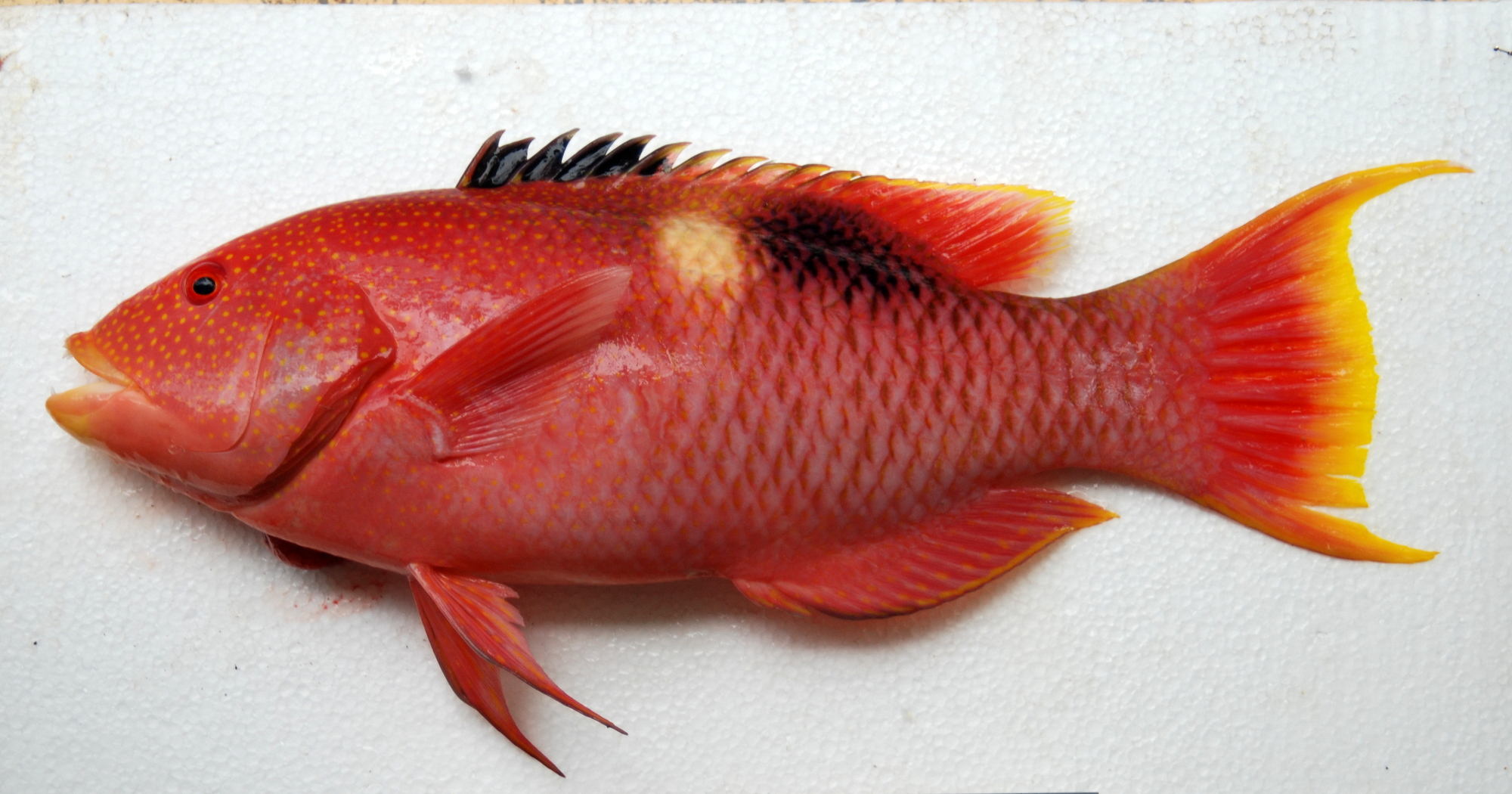
- Bodianus perditio

Scientific classification
- Kingdom: Animalia
- Phylum: Chordata
- Class: Actinopterygii
- Division: Teleostei
- Order: Labriformes
- Family: Labridae
- Subfamily: Hypsigenyinae
- Genus: Bodianus; Bloch, 1790

Type species
- Bodianus bodianus Bloch, 1790

Synonyms
- List: Chaeropsodes Gilchrist & Thompson, 1909; Cheiliopsis Steindachner 1863; Clepticus G. Cuvier, 1829; Cossyphus Valenciennes, 1839; Diastodon Bowdich, 1825; Euhypsocara Gill, 1863; Gymnopropoma Gill, 1863; Harpe Lacepède, 1802; Lepidaplois Gill, 1862; Paralepidaplois Gomon, 2006; Peneverreo Gomon, 2006; Pimelometopon T. N. Gill, 1864; PriobodianusGomon, 2006; Pseudolepidaplois Bauchot & Blanc, 1961; Ronchifex Gistel, 1848; Semicossyphus Günther, 1861; Trochocopus Günther, 1862; Verreo Jordan & Snyder, 1902; Verriculus Jordan & Evermann, 1903

= Bodianus =

Bodianus Temporal range: 14–0 Ma Middle Miocene to present

Genus of fishes

Bodianus is a genus of fishes in the family of wrasses, the Labridae, which are commonly known as hogfishes. They are found in the Atlantic, Indian, and Pacific Oceans. These species have many parasites.

== Taxonomy ==
Bodianus belongs to the wrasse tribe Hypsigenyini. Gomon (2006) split up the species in Bodianus amongst 10 subgenera. However, these subclassifications of Bodianus only roughly line up with findings of more recent phylogenetic analyses.

The three species B. darwini, B. pulcher, and B. reticulatus, commonly called the sheephead wrasses, have traditionally formed their own genus Semicossyphus. Although at least the latter two species form a monophyletic lineage with each other, Semicossyphus has subsequently been synonymized with Bodianus, as molecular phylogenetics found that Semicossyphus is nested deep within Bodianus.

Similarly, Clepticus parrae and likely all Clepticus species also nest within Bodianus.

== Species ==
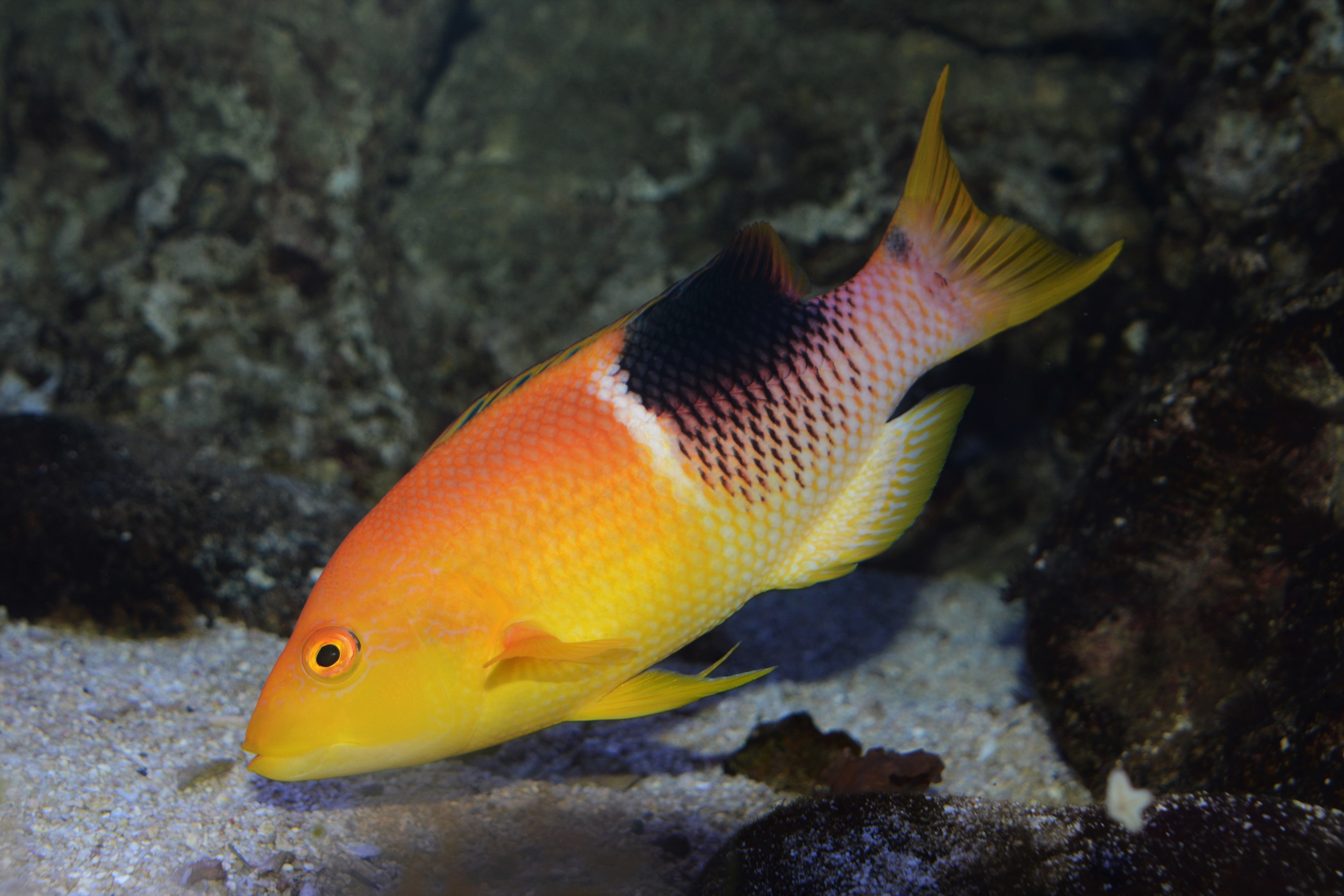
B. atrolumbus

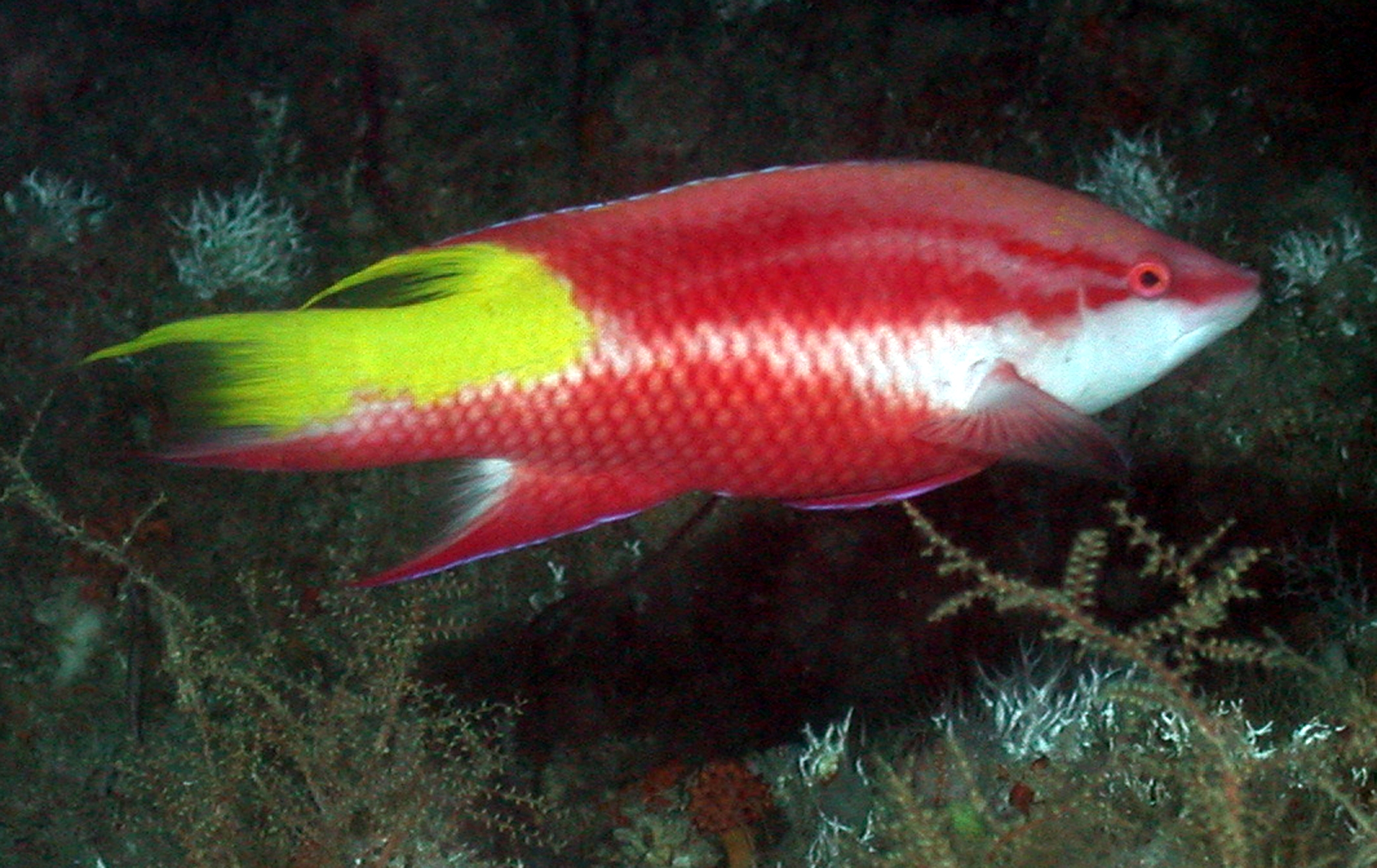
B. pulchellus

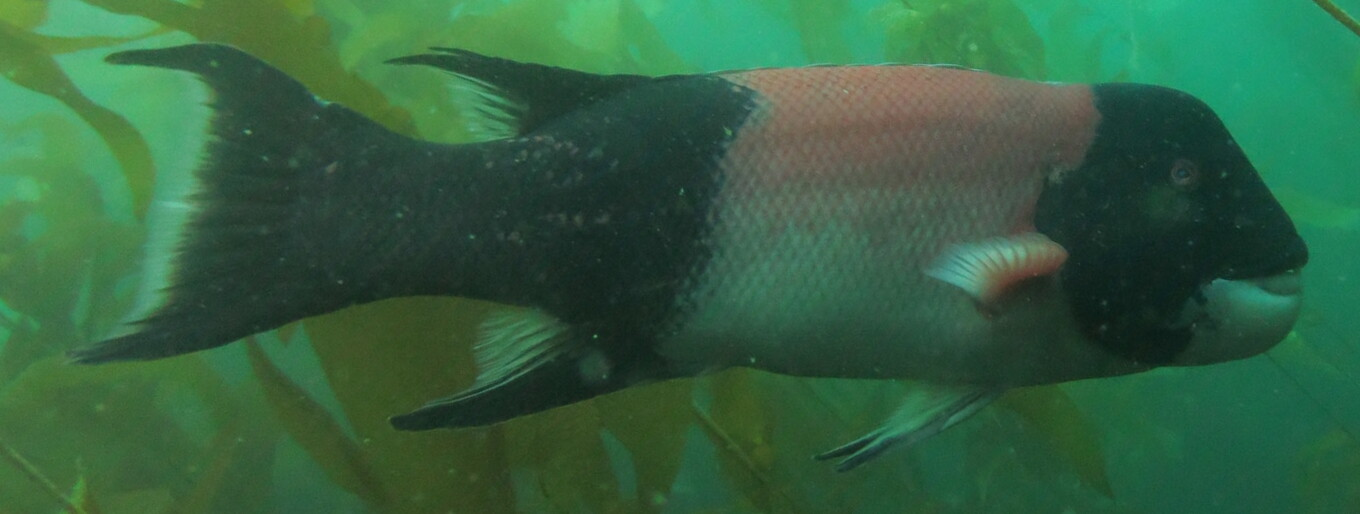
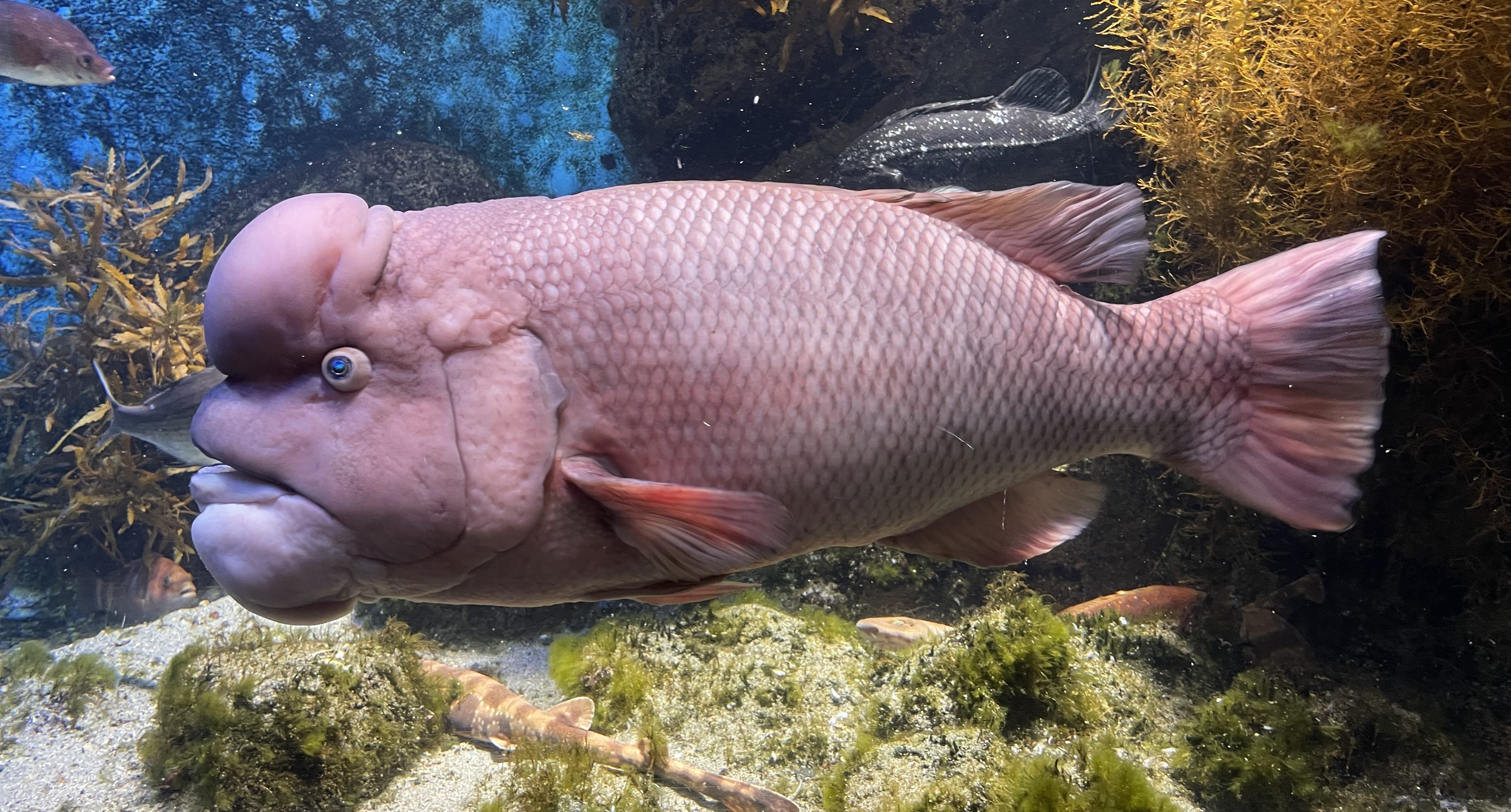
B. pulcher & B. reticulatus, formerly Semicossyphus.

Currently, 45 species are recognized in this genus:

- Bodianus africanus Heiser, R. L. Moura & D. R. Robertson, 2000 (African creole wrasse)
- Bodianus albotaeniatus (Valenciennes, 1839)
- Bodianus anthioides (E. T. Bennett, 1832) (lyre-tail hogfish)
- Bodianus atrolumbus (Valenciennes, 1839) (pale-bar hogfish)
- Bodianus axillaris (E. T. Bennett, 1832) (axil-spot hogfish)
- Bodianus bathycapros M. F. Gomon, 2006
- Bodianus bennetti M. F. Gomon & F. M. Walsh, 2016 (lemon-striped pygmy hogfish)
- Bodianus bilunulatus (Lacépède, 1801) (tarry hogfish)
- Bodianus bimaculatus G. R. Allen, 1973 (two-spot hogfish)
- Bodianus brasiliensis Heiser, R. L. Moura & D. R. Robertson, 2000 (Brazilian creole wrasse)
- Bodianus busellatus M. F. Gomon, 2006
- Bodianus cylindriatus (S. Tanaka (I), 1930)
- Bodianus darwini (Jenyns, 1842) (Galápagos sheepshead, goldspot sheepshead)
- Bodianus diana (Lacépède, 1801) (Diana's hogfish)
- Bodianus dictynna M. F. Gomon, 2006 (red-fin hogfish)
- Bodianus diplotaenia (T. N. Gill, 1862) (Mexican hogfish)
- Bodianus eclancheri (Valenciennes, 1846) (harlequin hogfish)
- Bodianus flavifrons M. F. Gomon, 2001 (masked hogfish)
- Bodianus flavipinnis M. F. Gomon, 2001 (yellow-fin hogfish)
- Bodianus frenchii (Klunzinger, 1879) (fox hogfish)
- Bodianus insularis M. F. Gomon & Lubbock, 1980 (island hogfish)
- Bodianus izuensis Araga & Yoshino, 1975 (striped hogfish)
- Bodianus leucosticticus (E. T. Bennett, 1832) (lined hogfish)
- Bodianus loxozonus (Snyder, 1908) (black-fin hogfish)
- Bodianus macrognathos (R. E. Morris, 1974) (giant hogfish)
- Bodianus macrourus (Lacépède, 1801) (black-banded hogfish)
- Bodianus masudai Araga & Yoshino, 1975
- Bodianus mesothorax (Bloch & J. G. Schneider, 1801) (split-level hogfish)
- Bodianus neilli (F. Day, 1867) (Bay of Bengal hogfish)
- Bodianus neopercularis M. F. Gomon, 2006
- Bodianus opercularis (Guichenot, 1847) (black-spot hogfish)
- Bodianus oxycephalus (Bleeker, 1862)
- Bodianus parrae (Bloch & J. G. Schneider, 1801) (creole wrasse)
- Bodianus paraleucosticticus M. F. Gomon, 2006
- Bodianus perditio (Quoy & Gaimard, 1834) (golden-spot hogfish)
- Bodianus prognathus Lobel, 1981
- Bodianus pulchellus (Poey, 1860) (spot-fin hogfish)
- Bodianus pulcher (Ayres, 1854) (California sheepshead)
- Bodianus reticulatus (Valenciennes, 1839) (Asian sheepshead wrasse)
- Bodianus rubrisos M. F. Gomon, 2006 (red-sashed hogfish)
- Bodianus rufus (Linnaeus, 1758) (Spanish hogfish)
- Bodianus sanguineus (D. S. Jordan & Evermann, 1903) (sunrise hogfish)
- Bodianus scrofa (Valenciennes, 1839) (barred hogfish)
- Bodianus sepiacaudus M. F. Gomon, 2006 (crescent-tail hogfish)
- Bodianus solatus M. F. Gomon, 2006
- Bodianus speciosus (S. Bowdich, 1825) (black-bar hogfish)
- Bodianus tanyokidus M. F. Gomon & Madden, 1981
- Bodianus thoracotaeniatus Yamamoto, 1982
- Bodianus trilineatus (Fowler, 1934) (four-line hogfish)
- Bodianus unimaculatus (Günther, 1862) (red hogfish)
- Bodianus vulpinus (J. Richardson, 1850) (western hogfish)
