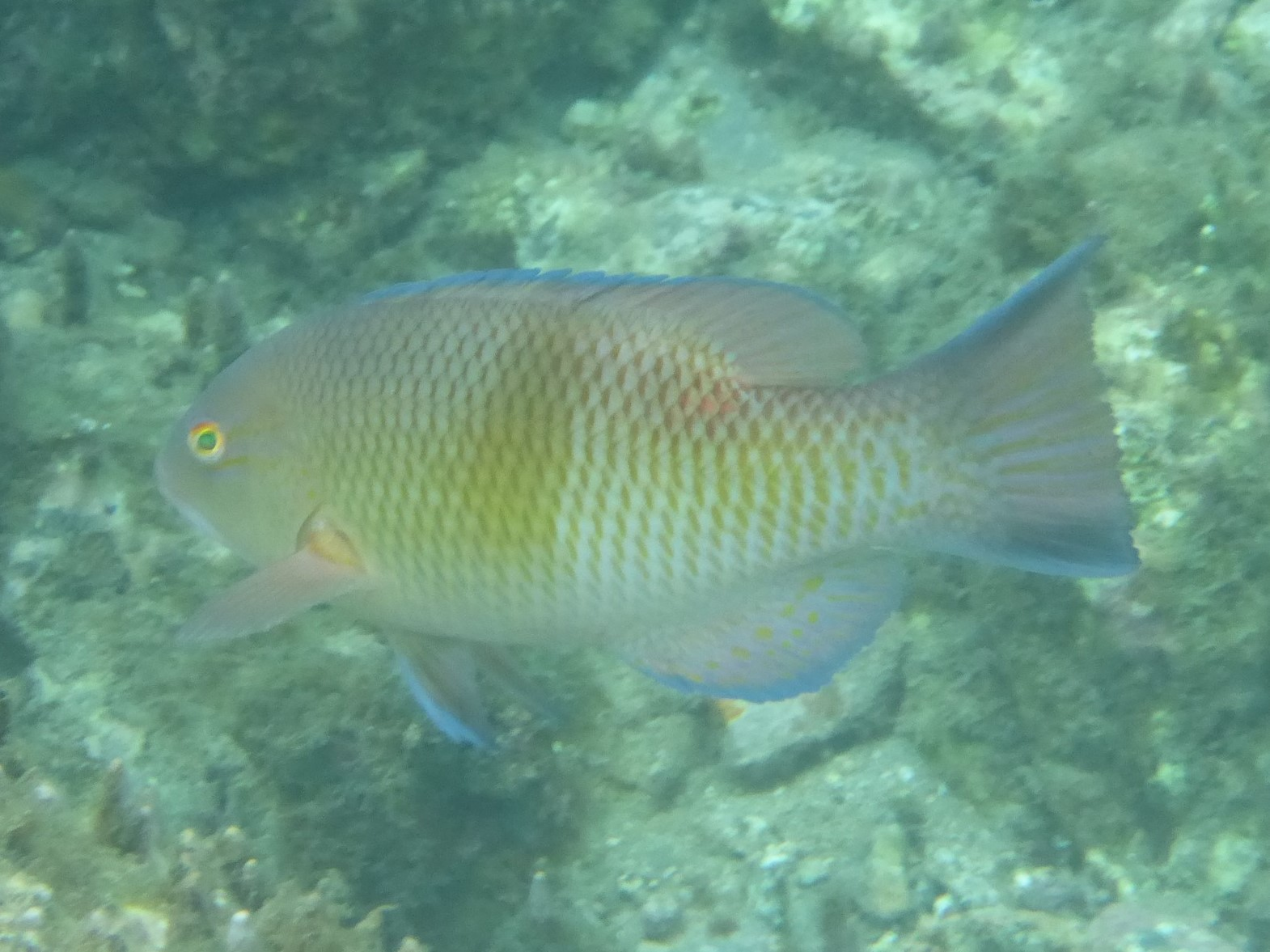

Conservation status
- Data Deficient (IUCN 3.1)

Scientific classification
- Kingdom: Animalia
- Phylum: Chordata
- Class: Actinopterygii
- Order: Labriformes
- Family: Labridae
- Genus: Bodianus
- Species: B. speciosus

Binomial name
- Bodianus speciosus (S. Bowdich, 1825)

Synonyms
- Diastodon speciosus Bowdich, 1825; Labrus iagonensis Bowdich, 1825; Bodianus iagonensis (Bowdich, 1825)

= Bodianus speciosus =

Species of fish

Bodianus speciosus, the blackbar hogfish, is a species of wrasse. It is found in the eastern-central Atlantic Ocean.

== Description ==
This species reaches a length of 50.0 cm (19.7 in).
