= Bodianus bathycapros =

Conservation status
- Least Concern (IUCN 3.1)

Scientific classification
- Kingdom: Animalia
- Phylum: Chordata
- Class: Actinopterygii
- Order: Labriformes
- Family: Labridae
- Genus: Bodianus
- Species: B. bathycapros

Binomial name
- Bodianus bathycapros Gomon, 2006

Species of fish

Bodianus bathycapros is a species of wrasse native to tropical and warm temperate waters of the Pacific Ocean, particularly the Hawaiian Islands. It is restricted to deeper waters and has been observed from submersibles at depths of around 190 metres (620 ft). It is an oviparous species in which the male and female form distinct pairs when spawning.
