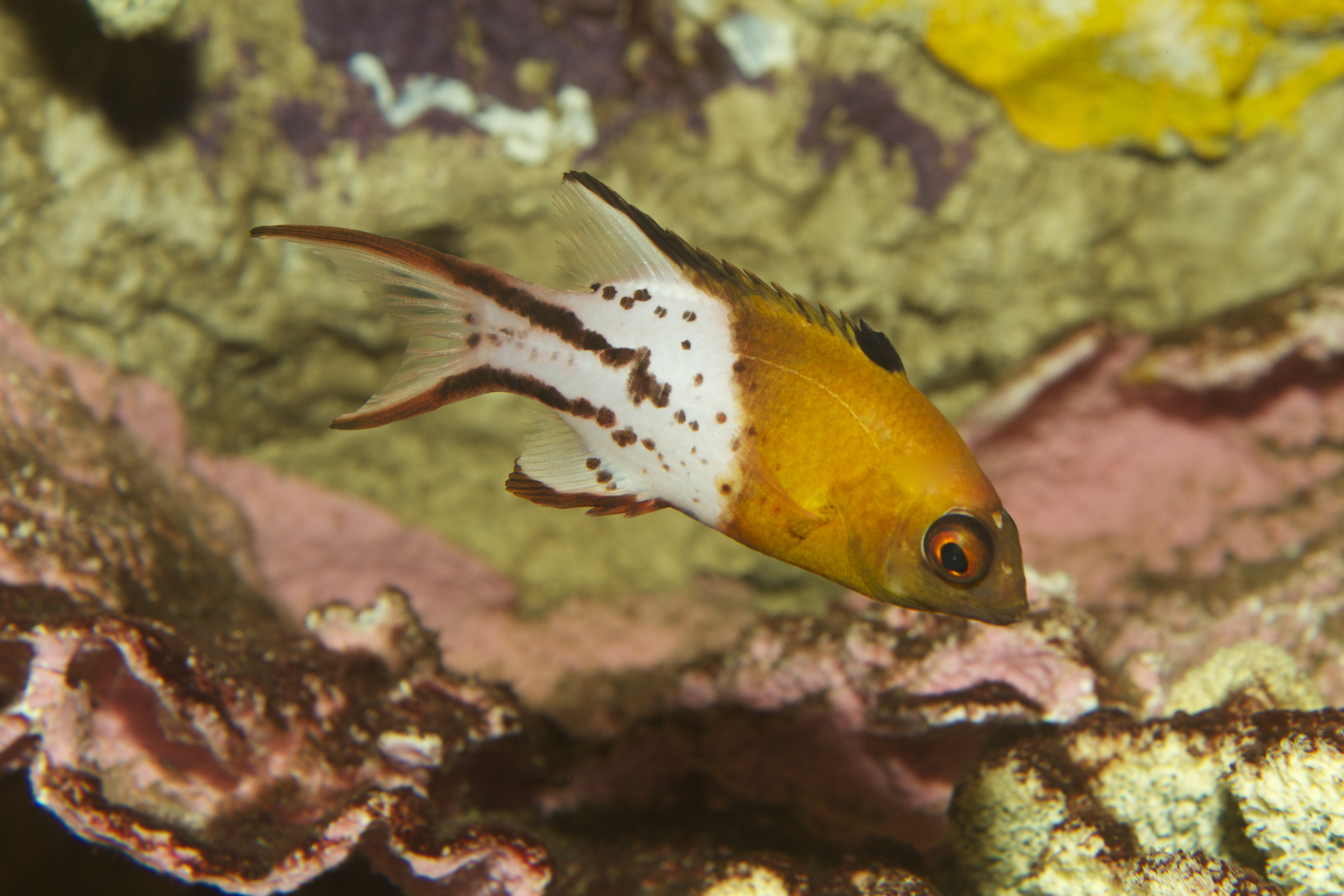

Conservation status
- Least Concern (IUCN 3.1)

Scientific classification
- Kingdom: Animalia
- Phylum: Chordata
- Class: Actinopterygii
- Order: Labriformes
- Family: Labridae
- Genus: Bodianus
- Species: B. anthioides

Binomial name
- Bodianus anthioides (E. T. Bennett, 1832)

Synonyms
- Crenilabrus anthioides Bennett, 1832; Lepidaplois anthioides (Bennett, 1832); Cossyphus zosterophorus Bleeker, 1857; Cossyphus bicolor Liénard, 1891; Cossyphus boutoni Liénard, 1891

= Lyretail hogfish =

Species of fish

The lyretail hogfish (Bodianus anthioides), also known as the lyretail pigfish, is a species of wrasse from the genus Bodianus. The fish can be found in the Indo-Pacific from the Red Sea to Tuamotu. The adults occur along the seaward edges of reefs and in Micronesia are commonest below 25 metres (82 ft) in depth. They are solitary fish, forming pairs for spawning. The juvelines mimic cleaner fish. The species' diet includes echinoderms, mollusks, crustaceans, and small fish. It grows to a length of 25 centimetres (9.8 in).
