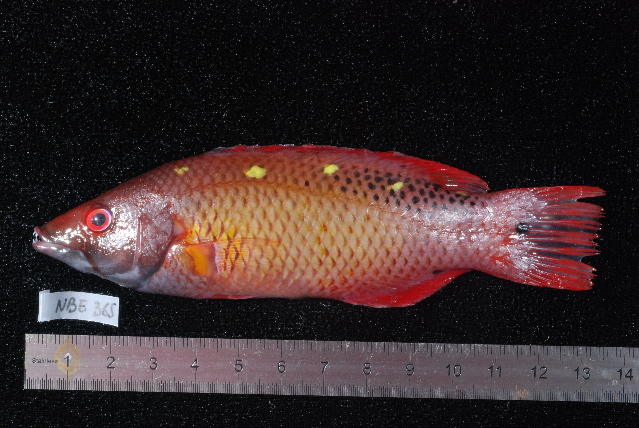

Conservation status
- Least Concern (IUCN 3.1)

Scientific classification
- Kingdom: Animalia
- Phylum: Chordata
- Class: Actinopterygii
- Order: Labriformes
- Family: Labridae
- Genus: Bodianus
- Species: B. diana

Binomial name
- Bodianus diana (Lacépède, 1801)

Synonyms
- Labrus diana Lacépède, 1801; Lepidaplois diana (Lacépède, 1801); Lepidaplois aldabrensis J. L. B. Smith, 1956

= Diana's hogfish =

Species of fish

Diana's hogfish, Bodianus diana, is a species of wrasse native to the Indian Ocean from the African coast to the Nicobars and the Cocos-Keeling Islands. Reports of its presence in the western Pacific Ocean are erroneous. It occurs on the seaward side of reefs at depths from 6 to 50 m (20 to 164 ft) (though rarely deeper than 25 m (82 ft)). It can reach a length of 16.9 cm (6.7 in). This species is of minor importance to local commercial fisheries and is found in the aquarium trade.

== Habitat ==
Diana's hogfish is generally found in the Indo-Pacific region including the Red Sea and East Africa towards the Marshall Islands. Juveniles have been observed living among the tentacles of the mushroom coral Heliofungia actiniformis.

== Diet ==
Diana's hogfish feeds mainly on benthic invertebrates such as mollusks and crustaceans. Juveniles are known to remove parasites from other fishes.

== Utilization ==
This species is collected for the aquarium trade.
