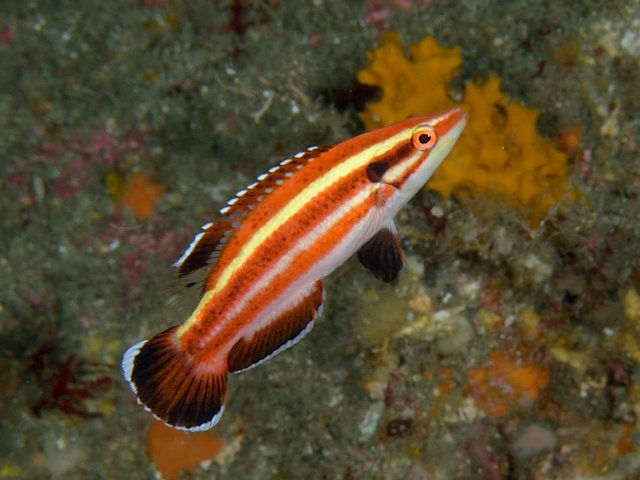

Conservation status
- Least Concern (IUCN 3.1)

Scientific classification
- Kingdom: Animalia
- Phylum: Chordata
- Class: Actinopterygii
- Division: Teleostei
- Order: Labriformes
- Family: Labridae
- Genus: Bodianus
- Species: B. masudai

Binomial name
- Bodianus masudai Araga & Yoshino, 1975

= Bodianus masudai =

Species of fish

Bodianus masudai is a species of wrasse. It is found in the western Pacific Ocean.

== Description ==
This species reaches a length of 12.0 cm (4.7 in).

== Etymology ==
The fish is named in honor of Hajime Masuda (1921–2005) of the University of Tokyo, who collected the type specimen and co-authored the study in which the fish's description appeared.
