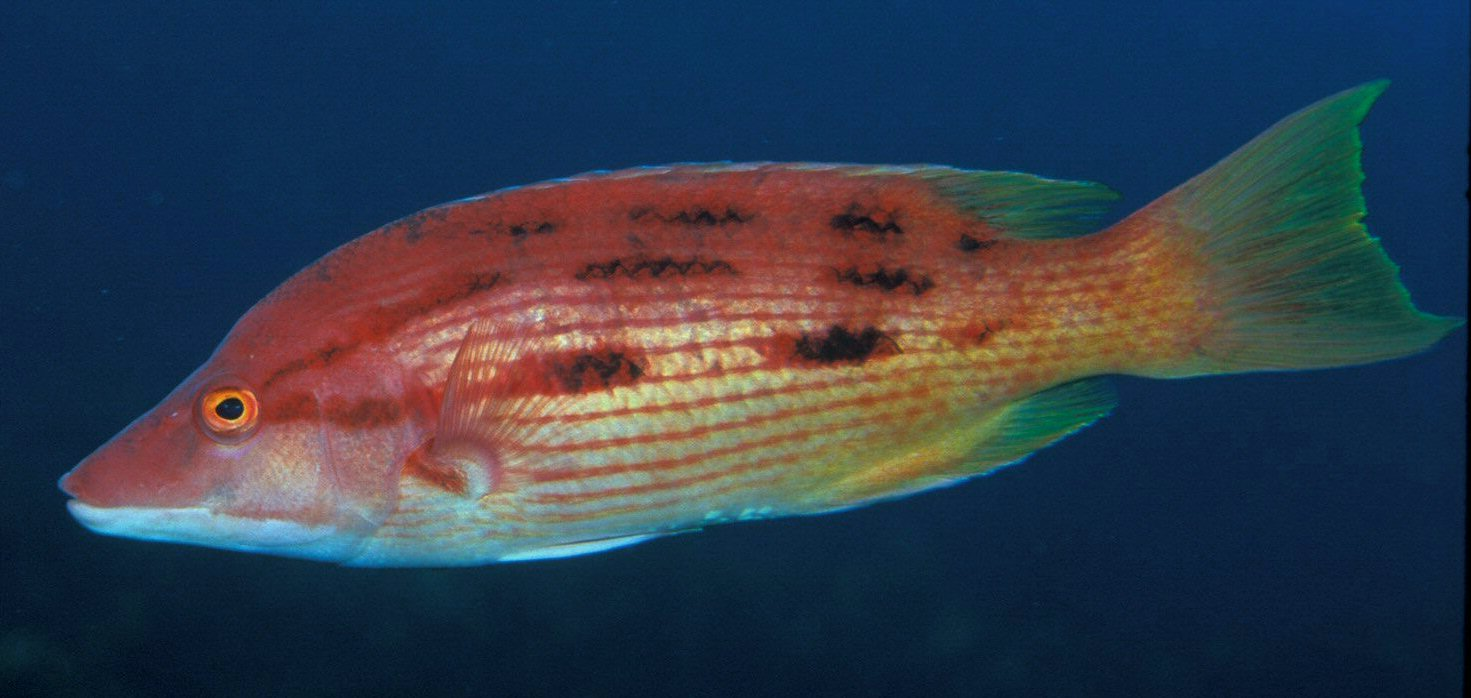

Conservation status
- Least Concern (IUCN 3.1)

Scientific classification
- Kingdom: Animalia
- Phylum: Chordata
- Class: Actinopterygii
- Order: Labriformes
- Family: Labridae
- Genus: Bodianus
- Species: B. unimaculatus

Binomial name
- Bodianus unimaculatus (Günther, 1862)

Synonyms
- Cossyphus unimaculatus Günther, 1862; Cossyphus bellis E. P. Ramsay, 1887

= Red pigfish =

Species of fish

The red pigfish (Bodianus unimaculatus), also known as the red hogfish or eastern pigfish, is a species of wrasse native to the southwestern Pacific Ocean from eastern Australia to New Zealand, including Lord Howe Island, Norfolk Island, and the Kermadec Islands. It inhabits reefs and offshore waters, where it occurs from the surface to 60 m (200 ft) deep. Males of this species can reach a length of 50 cm (20 in), while females only reach 30 cm (12 in).
