= Bodianus opercularis =

Conservation status
- Least Concern (IUCN 3.1)

Scientific classification
- Kingdom: Animalia
- Phylum: Chordata
- Class: Actinopterygii
- Order: Labriformes
- Family: Labridae
- Genus: Bodianus
- Species: B. opercularis

Binomial name
- Bodianus opercularis (Guichenot, 1847)

Synonyms
- Cossyphus opercularis Guichenot, 1847; Trochocopus opercularis (Guichenot, 1847); Cheiliopsis bivittatus Steindachner, 1863

Species of fish

Bodianus opercularis, the blackspot hogfish, is a species of wrasse. It is found in the Indian Ocean, the Red Sea, the Gulf of Aqaba in the north to Madagascar and Mauritius in the south, and east to Christmas Island.

== Description ==
This species reaches a length of 18.0 cm (7.1 in).
