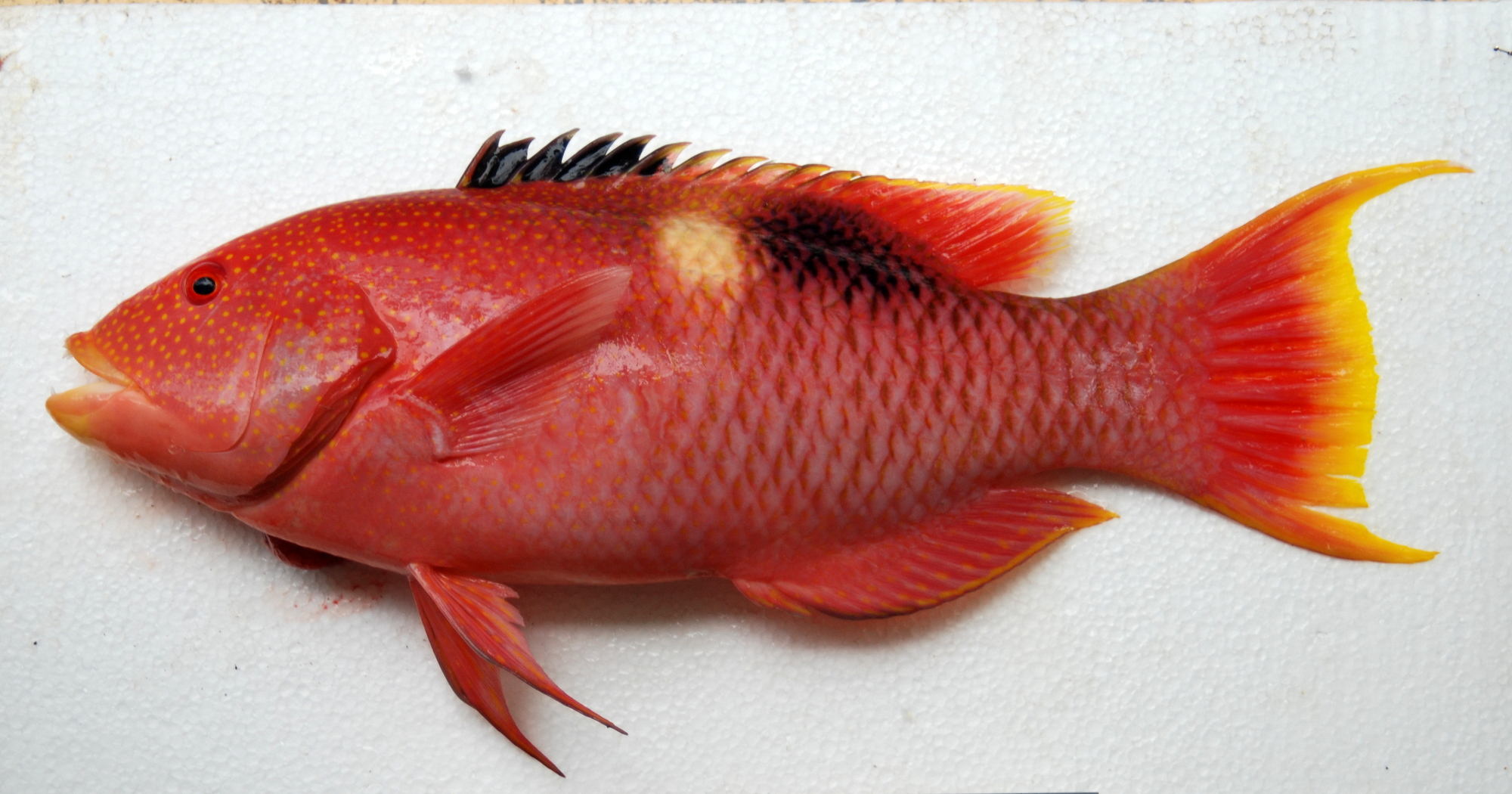

Conservation status
- Least Concern (IUCN 3.1)

Scientific classification
- Kingdom: Animalia
- Phylum: Chordata
- Class: Actinopterygii
- Order: Labriformes
- Family: Labridae
- Genus: Bodianus
- Species: B. perditio

Binomial name
- Bodianus perditio (Quoy & Gaimard, 1834)

Synonyms
- Labrus perditio Quoy & Gaimard, 1834; Lepidaplois perditio (Quoy & Gaimard, 1834); Trochocopus sanguinolentus De Vis, 1883; Cossyphus aurifer De Vis, 1884; Cossyphus latro De Vis, 1885

= Bodianus perditio =

Species of fish

Bodianus perditio, the golden-spot hogfish, is a species of wrasse found in the Pacific Ocean.

== Description ==
This species reaches a length of 80.0 cm (31.5 in).

== Etymology ==
The fish is named for ruin or destruction, referring to precarious position of the corvette Astrolabe, which stranded on the reefs of Tonga in the South Pacific. Quoy facing the "perdition" in which the ship, the crew and all the specimens that had been collected would be lost, resolutely stuck to the work of illustrating this species. The ship, the crew and the illustration survived but the type specimen did not.
