= Wular Lake =

Fresh water lake in Jammu and Kashmir, India

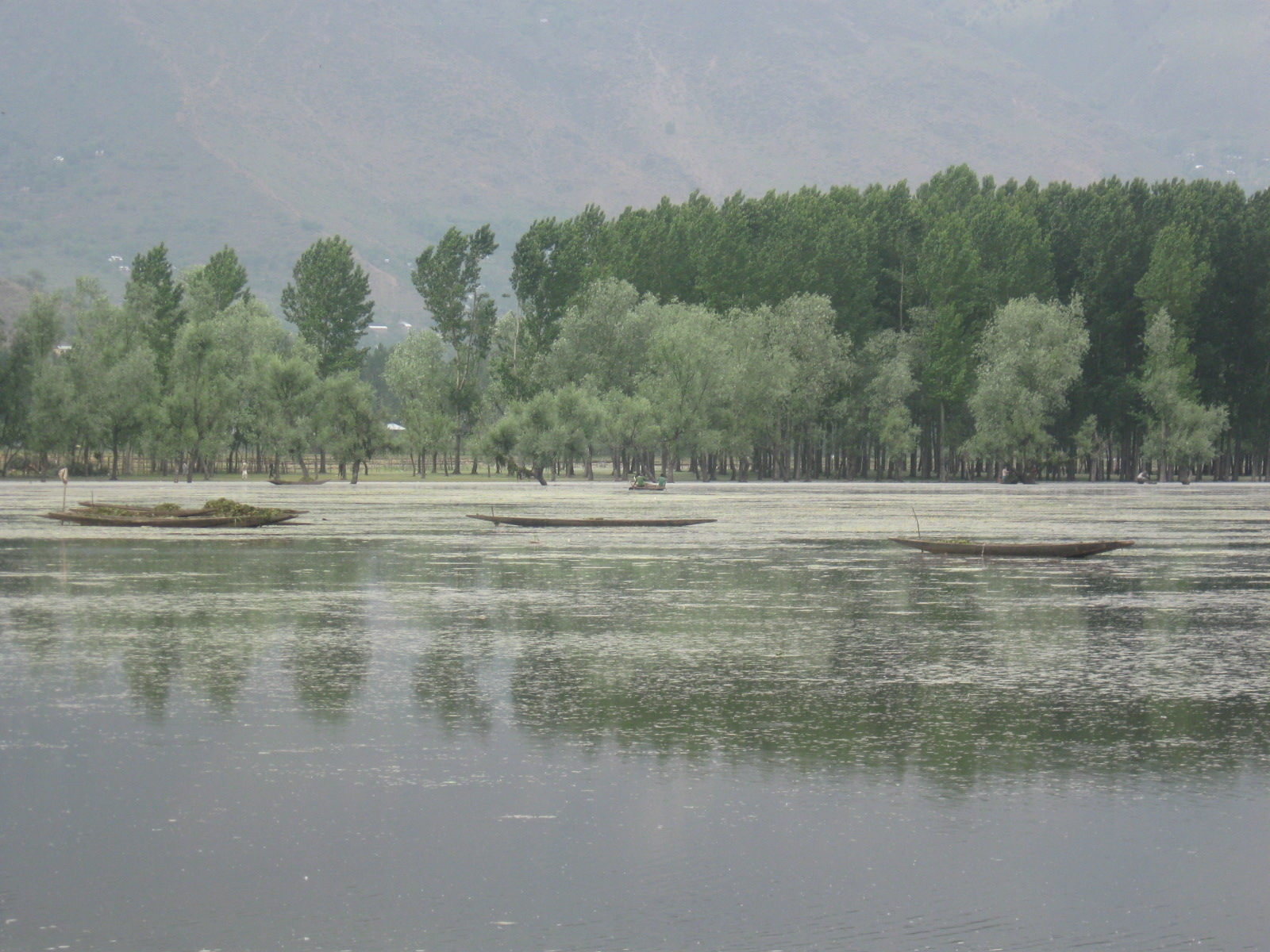
- Boats floating in Wular Lake

- Location within Jammu and Kashmir
- Interactive map of Wular Lake
- Location: Bandipora, Jammu & Kashmir, India
- Coordinates: 34°22′10.4″N 74°33′33.34″E
- Type: Freshwater Lake
- Primary inflows: Jhelum River
- Primary outflows: Jhelum River
- Basin countries: India
- Max. length: 16 km (9.9 mi)
- Max. width: 9.6 km (6.0 mi)
- Surface area: 30 to 189 km^{2} (12 to 73 sq mi)
- Max. depth: 14 m (46 ft)
- Surface elevation: 1,580 m (5,180 ft)
- Islands: Zainul Lank
- Settlements: Bandipora

Designations

Ramsar Wetland
- Designated: 23 March 1990
- Reference no.: 461

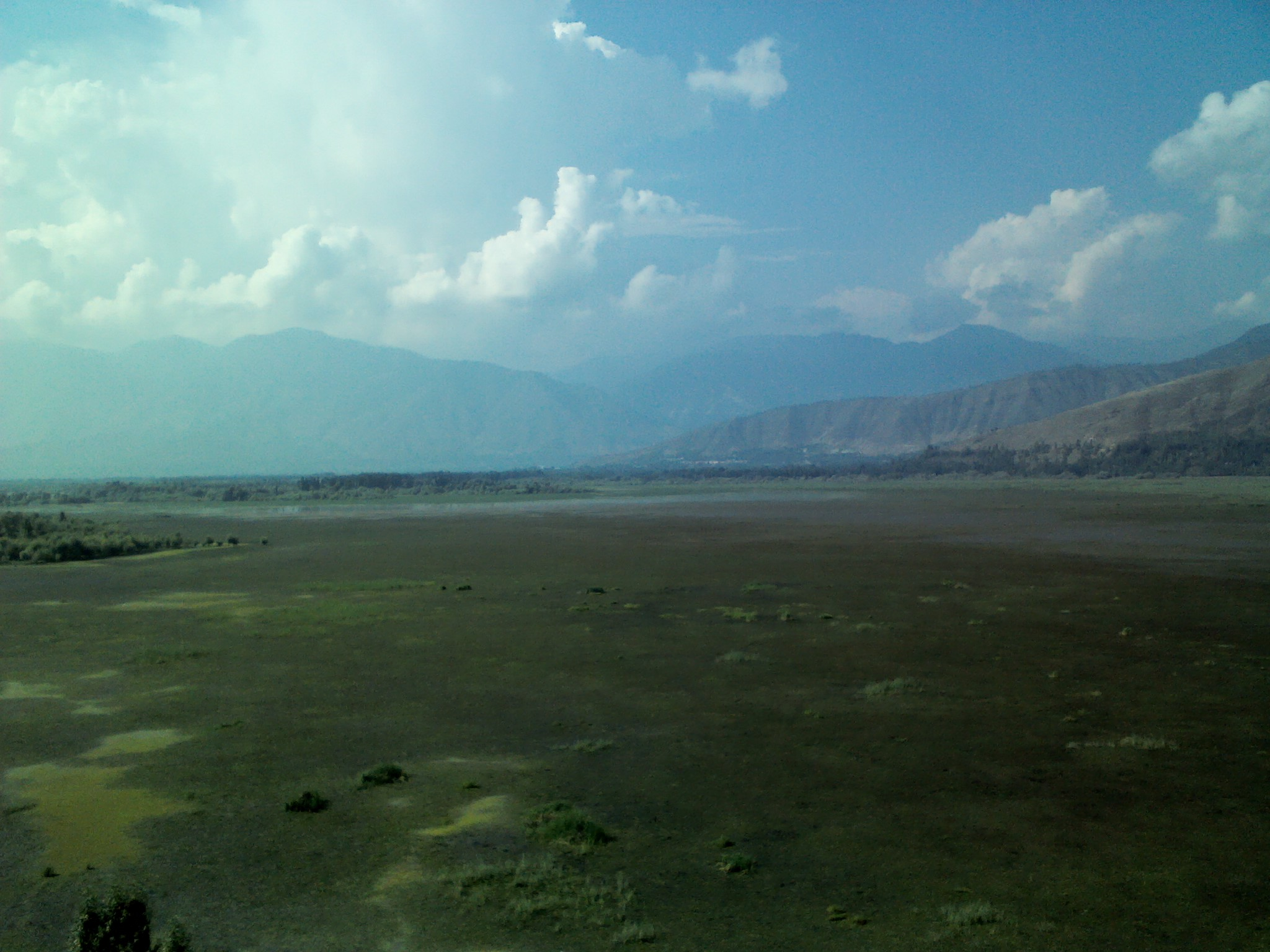
Wular Lake seen from Wular Vantage Park, Garoora.

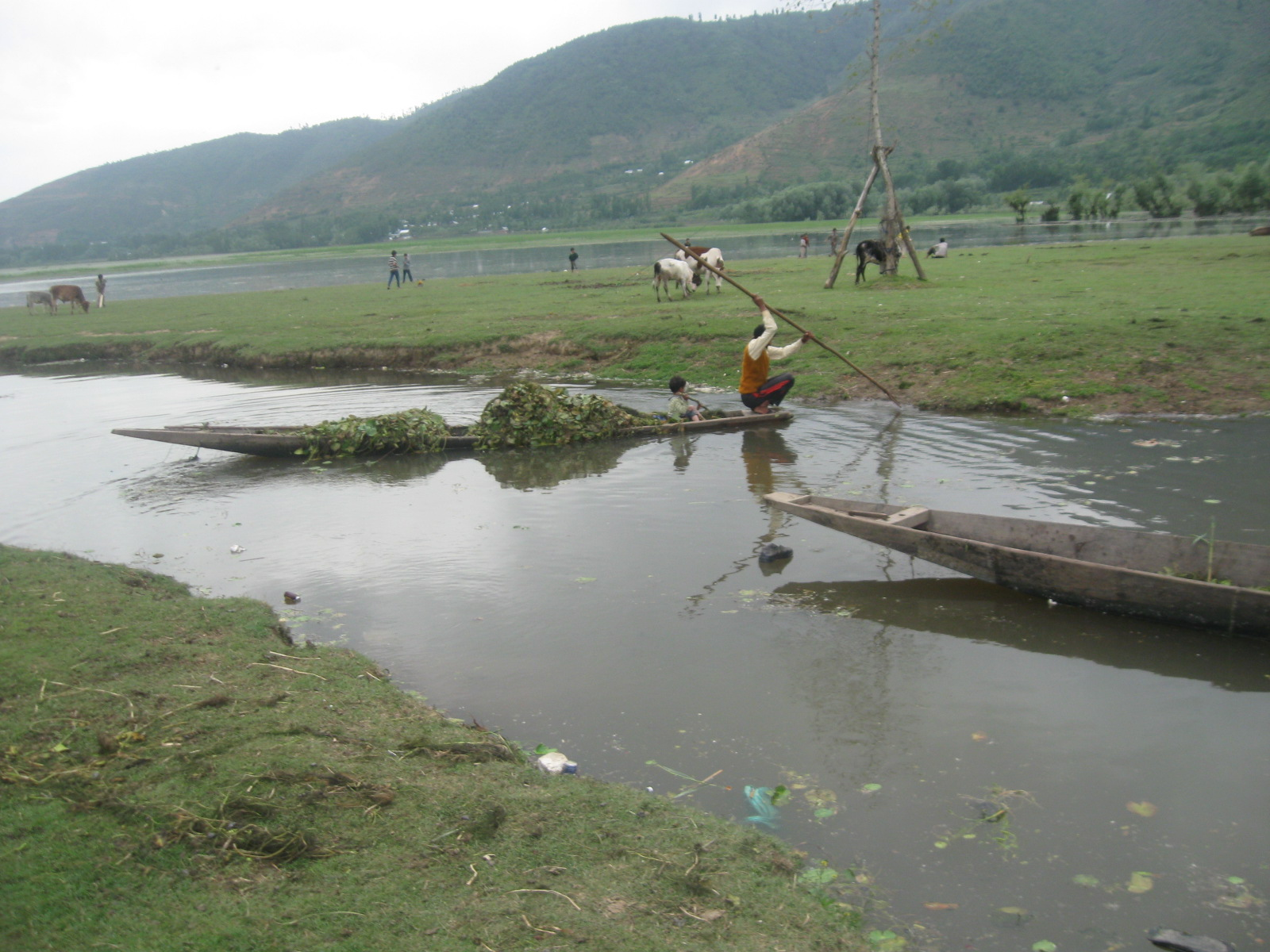
A boat carrying aquatic plants extracted from the Wular Lake

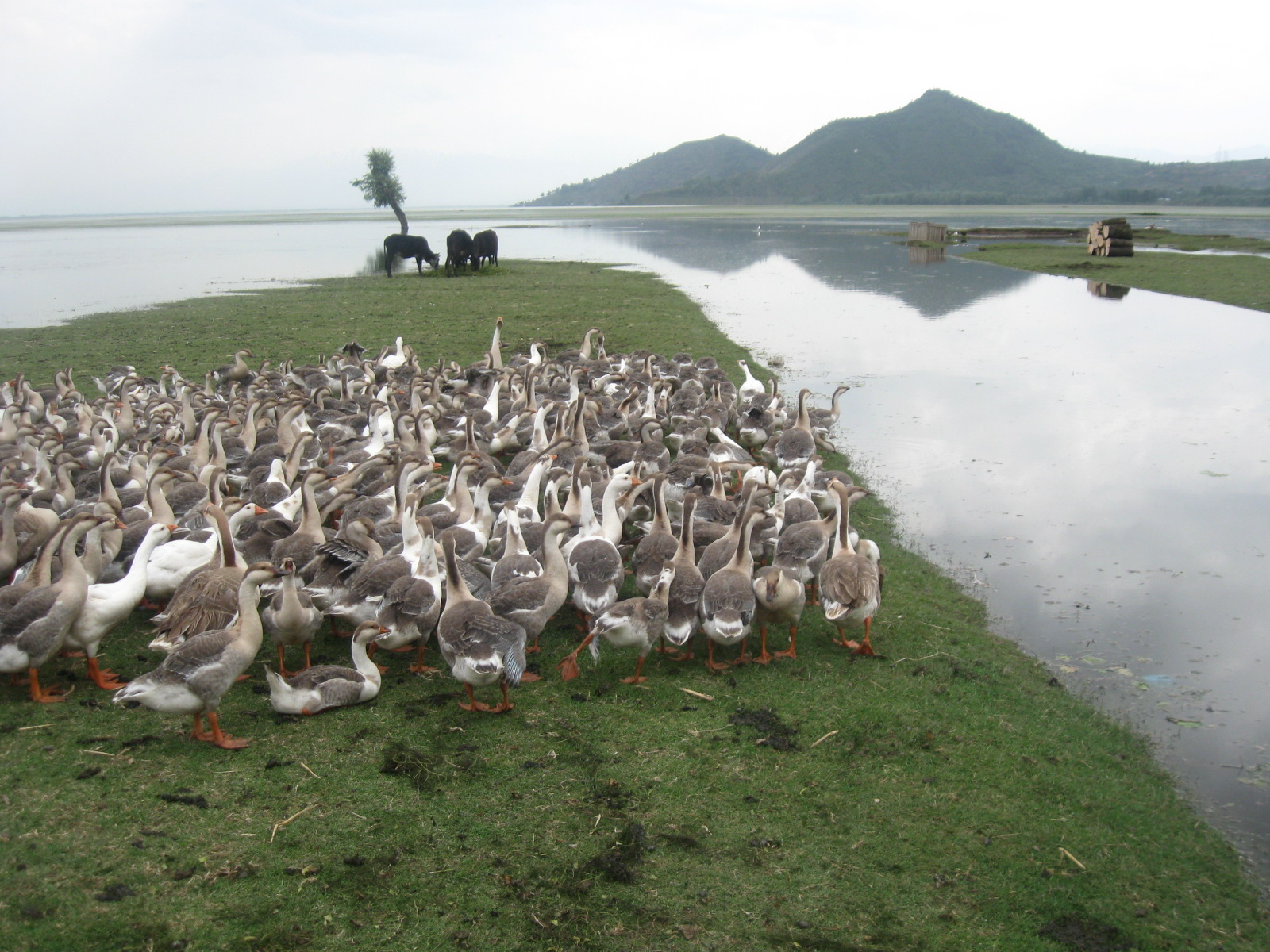
Domesticated geese and cows on the bank of Wular Lake

Wular Lake (Urdu pronunciation: [ʋʊlər]), also known as Wolar (Kashmiri pronunciation: [ʋɔlar]) in Kashmiri, is one of the largest freshwater lakes in the Indian subcontinent. It is located near Bandipora town in the Bandipora district of Jammu and Kashmir, India. The lake basin was formed as a result of tectonic activity and is fed by the Jhelum River and the streams Madhumati and Arin.

The lake's size varies seasonally from 30 to 189 square kilometres. In addition, much of the lake has been drained as a result of willow plantations being built on the shore in the 1950s.

== Background ==
=== Etymology ===
In ancient times, Wular Lake was also called Mahapadmasar (Sanskrit: महापद्मसरः). Nilamata Purana also mentions it as Mahapadmasaras. The lake, with its big dimensions and the extent of water, gives rise to high leaping waves in the afternoons, called Ullola in Sanskrit, meaning "stormy leaping, high rising waves". Therefore, it was also called Ullola. It is believed to have gotten corrupted over the centuries to Wulor or Wular. The origin may also be attributed to a Kashmiri word 'Wul', which means a gap or a fissure, an appellation that must have come also during this period. The word Wul (gap or fissure) is also an indicator of its origin from a fissure or gap created.

=== History ===
The Kashmiri sultan Zain-ul-Abidin is reputed to have ordered the construction of the artificial island of Zaina Lank in the middle of the lake in 1444.

According to the traditional beliefs in the vicinity of Wular Lake, there once stood a city whose king was Raja Sudrasen. By the reason of the enormity of his crimes, the waters of the lake rose and drowned him and his subjects. It was said that during the winter months, at low water, the ruins of the submerged idol temple might be seen rising from the lake. Zayn Ul Aabidin constructed a spacious barge which he sank in the lake and upon which he laid a foundation of bricks and stones till it rose high enough to be at level as the water. Upon this, he erected a Mosque and other buildings and gave the islet the name of Lanka. The expense of this work was defrayed by the fortunate discovery of two idols of solid gold, which had been brought up from the lake by divers.

== Ecology ==
=== Fish ===
Wular Lake is an important fish habitat, the main species being the common carp (Cyprinus carpio), rosy barb (Barbus conchonius), mosquitofish (Gambusia affinis), Nemacheilus species, Crossocheilus latius, and various snowtrout species in the genera Schizopyge and Schizothorax. Snowtrout species identified in the lake include the Sattar snowtrout (Schizopyge curvifrons), Chirruh snowtrout (Schizopyge esocinus), Schizothorax planifrons, Schizothorax macropogon, Schizothorax longipinus and Chush snowtrout (Schizopyge niger).

=== Birds ===
The lake sustains a rich population of birds. Terrestrial birds observed around the lake include the black-eared kite, Eurasian sparrowhawk, short-toed eagle, Himalayan golden eagle, Himalayan monal, chukar partridge, koklass pheasant, rock dove, common cuckoo, alpine swift, Indian roller, Himalayan woodpecker, hoopoe, barn swallow, golden oriole, and others.

== Economy ==
=== Aquatic greens ===
Many other families harvest the aquatic plants, such as the grass Phragmites and the waterlily-like Nymphoides, from the lake for human consumption and animal fodder.

=== Fishing ===
Fish from Wular Lake make up a significant part of the diet for many thousands of people living on its shores and elsewhere in the Kashmir Valley. More than eight thousand fishermen earn their livelihood from the lake, primarily fishing for the endemic Schizothorax species and the non-native carp. Their catch comprises about 60 percent of the total yield of fish in Kashmir. Hundreds of other local villagers are employed by cooperative societies that trade the fish catch..

=== Tourism ===
Boating, water sports, and water skiing have been launched by the Government of India Tourism in collaboration with Kerala Tourism and J&K Tourism. The contract for the operation of the site was awarded in September 2011.

== Issues ==
=== Environmental threats ===
The lake is one of the 98 Indian wetlands designated as a Ramsar site. However, it faces environmental threats including the conversion of large parts of the lake's catchment areas into agricultural land, pollution from fertilizers and animal wastes, hunting of waterfowl and migratory birds, and weed infestation in the lake itself.

=== Lake degradation ===
The shores of Wular Lake, one of the biggest freshwater lakes in South Asia, are now filled with trash. Waste has piled up along the lake's edges and in the water, endangering the lake's fish and plants. Parts of the lake have become shallow, and areas that used to be wide open water are now covered in mud and garbage. This buildup of waste and mud has made the lake smaller and shallower.

== Conservation ==
=== Recognition ===
In recognition of its biological, hydrological, and socio-economic values, the lake was included in 1986 as a Wetland of National Importance under the Wetlands Programme of the Ministry of Environment and Forests, Government of India, for intensive conservation and management purposes. Subsequently, in 1990, it was designated as a Wetland of International Importance under the Ramsar Convention. Against the Ramsar Convention, the lake area is being used for garbage dumping.

=== Restoration ===
Amongst other developments, two million trees will be cut to restore Wular Lake under the National Lake Conservation Programme. The Environment Ministry of India approved Rs 4 billion for the restoration project for the lake that will take 5 to 10 years, and was, after long delays, scheduled to start in December 2011. The partner organisation, South Asian Voluntary Association of Environmentalists (SAVE), is a joint initiative of individuals to protect the ecology and to conserve nature at Wular Lake.

=== Tulbul Lock Project ===
The Tulbul Lock Project (Tulbul Barrage or Wular Barrage or Tulbul Navigation Project), is an under-construction "river navigation lock-cum-water level control lock structure" at the mouth of Wular Lake the barrage structure of which is designed to be 439 feet (134 m) long and 40 feet (12 m) wide with maximum storage capacity of 300,000 acre⋅ft (370×10^{6} m^{3}) of water. The project aims to regulate the release of water from the natural storage in the lake to maintain a minimum draught of 4.5 feet (1.4 m) in the river up to Baramulla during the lean winter months. The lean season water inflows into the Wular Lake are enhanced from the Kishanganga River by the Kishanganga Hydroelectric Plant after generating electricity.

Other lakes, such as Manasbal Lake, Anchar Lake, Dal Lake, etc., which are not located on the Jhelum Main river, can be used similarly to Wular Lake to impound flood waters for flood protection in downstream areas, hydro electricity generation, navigation throughout the year, irrigation, municipal and industrial uses.

==== History ====
===== 1980: Conception =====
The project was conceived in the early 1980s, and work began in 1984. The average annual inflows or outflows from the lake are nearly 7 billion cubic meters.

===== 1987-2025: Work stopped due to IWT dispute =====
There was an ongoing dispute between India and Pakistan over the Tulbul Project between 1987 and 2025 (when India put the IWT in abeyance). In 1987, when Pakistan objected to the Tulbul construction project by stating that it violated the 1960 Indus Waters Treaty (IWT), India stopped the construction work on the project that year, but has since attempted to restart construction. The Jhelum River passing through the Kashmir valley below Wular Lake, which is a connecting lake as per IWT, provides an important means of transport for goods and people. To sustain navigation throughout the year, a minimum depth of water is needed. India contends that the Tulbul Project is permissible per paragraphs 7 (c) and 9 of Annexure E, IWT, while Pakistan maintains that the project is a violation of the treaty if the storage is above 10,000 acre-feet (12×10^{6} m^{3}) for non-power generation purposes. India hold the position that the suspension of work harmed the interests of the people of Jammu and Kashmir and also deprived irrigation and power benefits to the people of Pakistan that may accrue from regulated water releases. In 2025, India put the IWT in abayance under which Pakistan was blocking the construction of Wular Barrage, thus paving the way for India to revive the Wular Barrage construction project.

===== 2025: Project revived =====
In 2025, India suspended the IWT, and decided to expedite the work on the Tulbul project, construction of new CRBS (200 km long Chenab-Ravi-Beas-Sutlej Link Canal with 12 tunnels to link the Chenab, Ravi, Beas, and Sutlej rivers to bring their water to the Indira Gandhi Canal at Harike Barrage), work on increasing the capacity of major dams in Indus basin (such as Uri, Dulhasti, Salal, Baglihar, Nimu Bajgo, and Chutak) and the work on new major dams (Kishanganga, Ratle, and Pakal Dul.

==== Details ====
The lake storage capacity will be increased per IWT to 300,000 acre feet or more, up to 1580 m MSL, by considering it as a reservoir for a run-of-the-river (RoR) hydro power plant, by envisaging a low-head (nearly 8 meters rated head) power plant. The available deepened river bed level at the toe of the dam will be below 1,570 m (5,151 ft) MSL for a 4,000 cusecs flow.

==== Benefits ====
The project offers several benefits.

Construction of a RoR power plant with sufficient sluice gates would also flush the sediment from the lake area to preserve the lake.

The enlarged lake will also meet the downstream navigational requirements fully during the lean flow season.

The regulated buffer/surcharge water storage in the Wular lake would substantially enhance the power generation from the downstream Lower Jhelum (105 MW), Uri (720 MW), proposed 1124 MW Kohala (in PaK), proposed 720 MW Azad Pattan (in PaK), 590-MW Mahl hydropower project (in PaK), and proposed 720 MW Karot (in PaKistan) RoR hydel projects, though its own power plant's generation is marginal.

==== Current status ====
- 2025 Jun: In the context of India putting the IWT in abeyance, the revised DPR was being prepared by India for the construction of the Tulbul barrage.

== See also ==
- General
  - Dams on Jhelum river
  - Hathlangoo, village nearby
  - 2014 India–Pakistan floods
- Other lakes in J&K
  - Anchar Lake
  - Dal Lake
  - Gangbal Lake
  - Khanpursar
  - Manasbal Lake
