= Transcaspian marinka =

Conservation status
- Least Concern (IUCN 3.1)

Scientific classification
- Kingdom: Animalia
- Phylum: Chordata
- Class: Actinopterygii
- Division: Teleostei
- Order: Cypriniformes
- Family: Cyprinidae
- Subfamily: Schizothoracinae
- Genus: Schizothorax
- Species: S. pelzami

Binomial name
- Schizothorax pelzami Kessler, 1870

Synonyms
- Schizothorax raulinsii Günther, 1889; Schizothorax iranicus pelzami Karaman, 1969

Species of fish

The Transcaspian marinka (Schizothorax pelzami) is a species of freshwater ray-finned fish belonging to the family Cyprinidae, the carps and related fishes, and the subfamily Schizothoracinae, the snow barbels. This fish is found in Central Asia.

== Taxonomy ==
The Transcaspian marinka was first formally described in 1870 by the Baltic German professor and zoologist Karl Kessler with its type locality given as the Shah-rud River, northeastern Iran. This species is classified in the genus Schizothorax which is the type genus of the subfamily Schizothoracinae in the carp family Cyprinidae within the suborder Cyprinoidei in the order Cypriniformes.

== Etymology ==
The Transcaspian marinka is classified in the genus Schizothorax, a name which means "cloven-breast", from Ancient Greek schízeïn (σχίζειν) "to cleave" and thórax (θώραξ) "breast-plate", a reference to the fold of membranous skin in front of the anal fin of some species, this fold makes a slender separation of the scales on either side of the vent. The specific name honours Emmanuel Danilovich (or Evgeniy Dmitrievich) Pelzam, who was an assistant at the Kazan University Museum in Russia, who collected the holotype.

== Description ==
The Transcaspian marinka reaches a total length of 36 cm (14 in).

== Distribution ==
The Transcaspian marinka is found in southern Central Asia and has the westernmost distribution of any Schizothorax species. The range of this species covers the Tedzhen and Marghab rivers of Afghanistan and Turkmenistan including Iranian drainage of the Tedzhen where it is the Hari River. It has also been recorded from the Jam River, the Sharak River, the Akhland River around Mashhad, the Kashaf River and various smaller water bodies in Khorasan, the upper Kal Shur, Jajarm and Jovein rivers in the Kavir basin, as well as rivers near Shahrud.
