= Snowtrout =

A snowtrout is any of a number of ray-finned fishes from the Himalayas region. These cyprinids resemble the very distantly related trouts in habitus due to convergent evolution.

Genera containing "snowtrouts" are:

- Diptychus
- Ptychobarbus
- Schizopyge
- Schizopygopsis
- Schizothorax

The species most often called "the snowtrout" is Schizothorax richardsonii, but locally the term may refer to any other snowtrout species.
