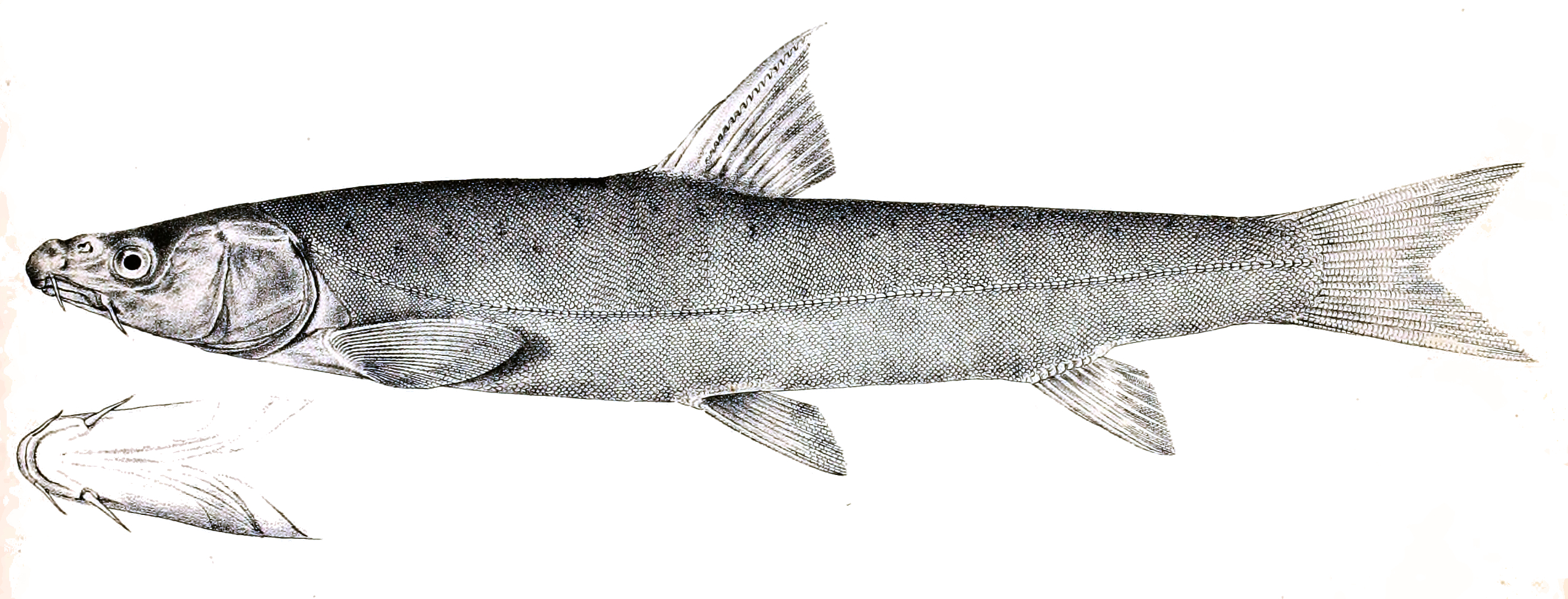

Conservation status
- Least Concern (IUCN 3.1)

Scientific classification
- Kingdom: Animalia
- Phylum: Chordata
- Class: Actinopterygii
- Order: Cypriniformes
- Family: Cyprinidae
- Subfamily: Schizothoracinae
- Genus: Schizothorax
- Species: S. labiatus

Binomial name
- Schizothorax labiatus (McClelland, 1842)

Synonyms
- Racoma labiatus McClelland, 1842; Schizothoraichthys labiatus (McClelland, 1842); Schizothorax ritchieana McClelland & Griffith, 1842; Racoma chrysochlora McClelland, 1842; Schizothoraichthys chrysochlora (McClelland, 1842); Schizothorax chrysochlora (McClelland, 1842); Schizothorax ladacensis Zugmayer, 1909

= Kunar snowtrout =

Species of fish

The Kunar snowtrout (Schizothorax labiatus) is a species of ray-finned fish in the genus Schizothorax which is found in India, Nepal, Pakistan, Afghanistan and Tibet.
