= Bosten Lake =

Lake in Xinjiang, China

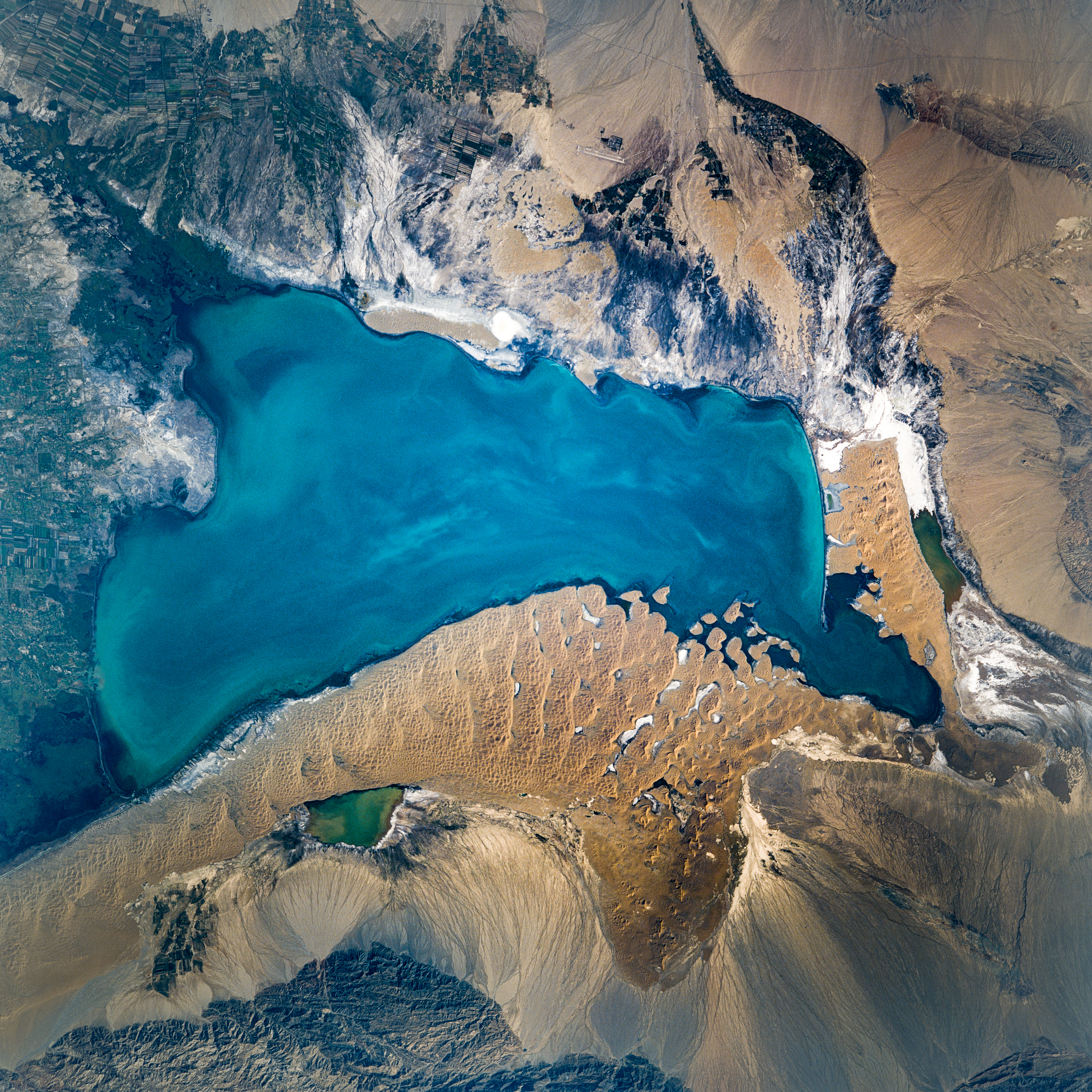
- Satellite picture (2 November 2004)

- Location within Bayingolin
- Location: Bayingolin Prefecture, Xinjiang
- Coordinates: 42°00′N 87°00′E
- Catchment area: 56,000 km^{2} (22,000 sq mi)
- Basin countries: China
- Max. length: 55 km (34 mi)
- Max. width: 25 km (16 mi)
- Surface area: 1,000 km^{2} (390 sq mi)
- Average depth: 8.15 m (26.7 ft)
- Max. depth: 17 m (56 ft)
- Water volume: 8,150,000,000 m^{3} (2.88×10^{11} cu ft)
- Surface elevation: 1,048 m (3,438 ft)

Bosten Lake (traditional Chinese: 博斯騰湖; simplified Chinese: 博斯腾湖; pinyin: Bósīténg Hú, Uyghur: باغراش كۆلى / Бағраш Көли / Baghrash Köli / Baƣrax Kɵli, Chagatai: Bostang) is a freshwater lake on the northeastern rim of the Tarim Basin, about 20 km (12 mi) east of Yanqi and 57 km (35 mi) northeast of Korla, Xinjiang, China in the Bayin'gholin Mongol Autonomous Prefecture. Covering an area of about 1,000 km^{2} (390 sq mi) (together with adjacent small lakes), it is the largest lake in Xinjiang and one of the largest inland freshwater lakes in China. Bosten lake receives water inflow from a catchment area of 56,000 km^{2} (22,000 sq mi).

The lake's Mongol, Uyghur and Chinese names are sometimes rendered as Bosten Hu, Bagrax-hu, Bagrasch-köl, Baghrasch köl, Bagratsch-kul, Bositeng Lake or Bositeng Hu.

The Kaidu River is the most important tributary to Lake Bosten, accounting for about 83% of its water inflow, other significant tributaries are the Huangshui Ditch (Chinese: 黃水溝), the Qingshui River (清水河), and Wulasite River (烏拉司特河). Lake Bosten's primarily outflow is to the southwest, also via the Kaidu River under the name Kongque River (Chinese: 孔雀河; pinyin: Kǒngquè Hé), which literally means "Peacock River".

An active fishery exists on the lake. Until the early 1970s, two cyprinid species, Schizothorax biddulphi and Aspiorhynchus laticeps, the latter of which is endemic to Bosten Lake and the Yarkand River, were responsible for 80 percent of the annual catch. During the years 1962 to 1965, various carp species (bighead, black, silver, grass, common, and crucian carp) were introduced into the lake. In the 1970s, these species become major targets of the fishing activities. Since 1978, the introduced European perch has been the dominating species in the catches from Bosten Lake.
