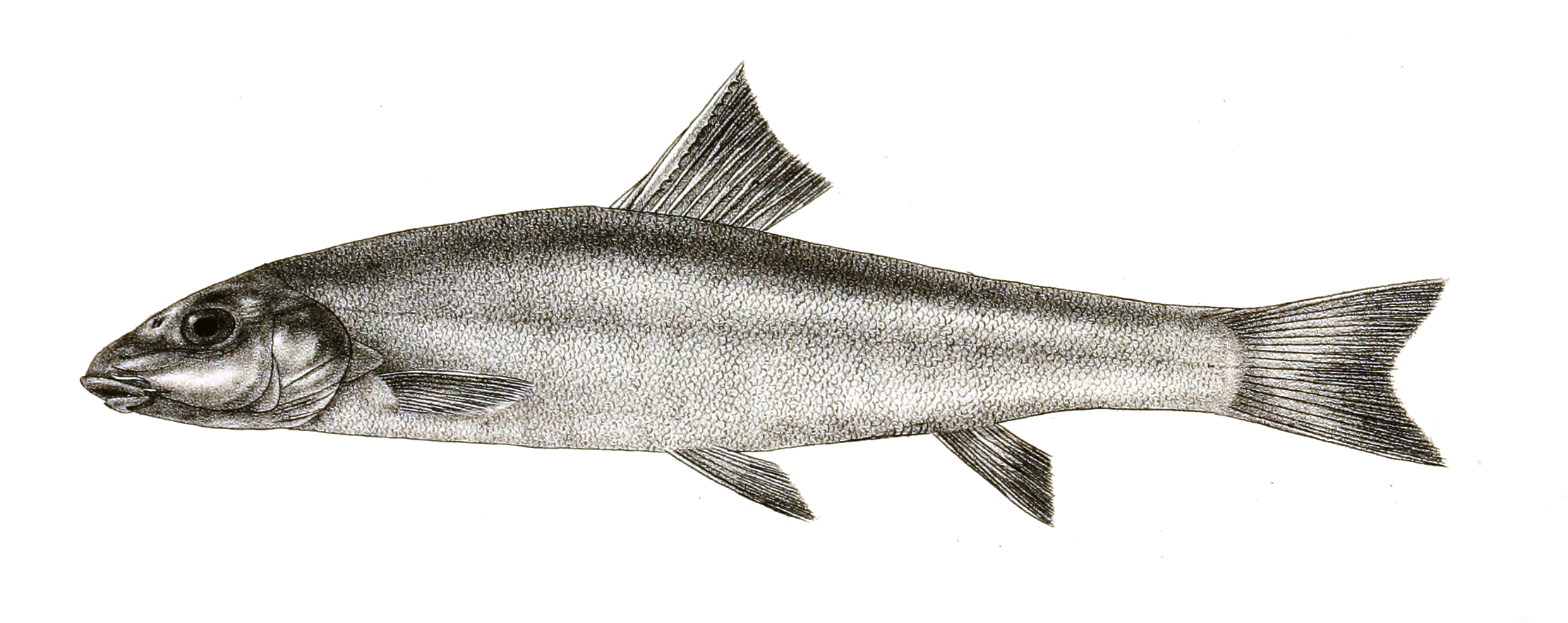

Conservation status
- Least Concern (IUCN 3.1)

Scientific classification
- Kingdom: Animalia
- Phylum: Chordata
- Class: Actinopterygii
- Order: Cypriniformes
- Family: Cyprinidae
- Subfamily: Schizothoracinae
- Genus: Schizothorax
- Species: S. progastus

Binomial name
- Schizothorax progastus (McClelland, 1839)

Synonyms
- Oreinus progastus McClelland, 1839; Racoma progasta (McClelland, 1839); Schizopyge progastus (McClelland, 1839); Oreinus hodgsonii Günther, 1861

= Dinnawah snowtrout =

Species of fish

The Dinnawah snowtrout (Schizothorax progastus) is a species of ray-finned fish in the genus Schizothorax from India and Nepal.
