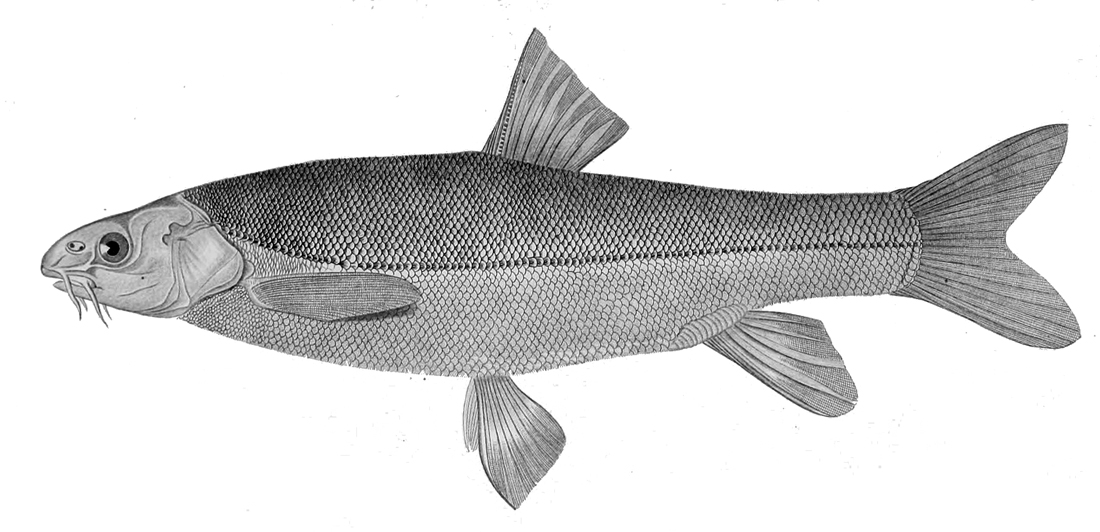

Conservation status
- Least Concern (IUCN 3.1)

Scientific classification
- Kingdom: Animalia
- Phylum: Chordata
- Class: Actinopterygii
- Order: Cypriniformes
- Family: Cyprinidae
- Subfamily: Schizothoracinae
- Genus: Schizothorax
- Species: S. eurystomus

Binomial name
- Schizothorax eurystomus Kessler, 1872

Synonyms
- Racoma eurystoma (Kessler, 1872)

= Schizothorax eurystomus =

Species of fish

Schizothorax eurystomus is a species of ray-finned fish in the genus Schizothorax, this species is found in Xinjiang, Kyrgyzstan, Tajikistan and Uzbekistan.
