= Asela =

Asela or Asella may refer to:

- Asela, an Indian name for the cyprinid Schizothorax plagiostomus, often erroneously applied to the Common snowtrout (S. richardsonii)
- Asela de los Santos, Cuban revolutionary and educator
- Asela of Sri Lanka, a Sinhalese king of the 2nd century BC
- Asella, a town in Ethiopia, west of Mount Chilalo
  - Asella Airport, IATA airport code ALK
