= Schizothorax edenianus =

Scientific classification
- Kingdom: Animalia
- Phylum: Chordata
- Class: Actinopterygii
- Order: Cypriniformes
- Family: Cyprinidae
- Subfamily: Schizothoracinae
- Genus: Schizothorax
- Species: S. edenianus

Binomial name
- Schizothorax edenianus McClelland, 1842

Species of fish

Schizothorax edenianus is a species of ray-finned fish in the genus Schizothorax from Afghanistan.
