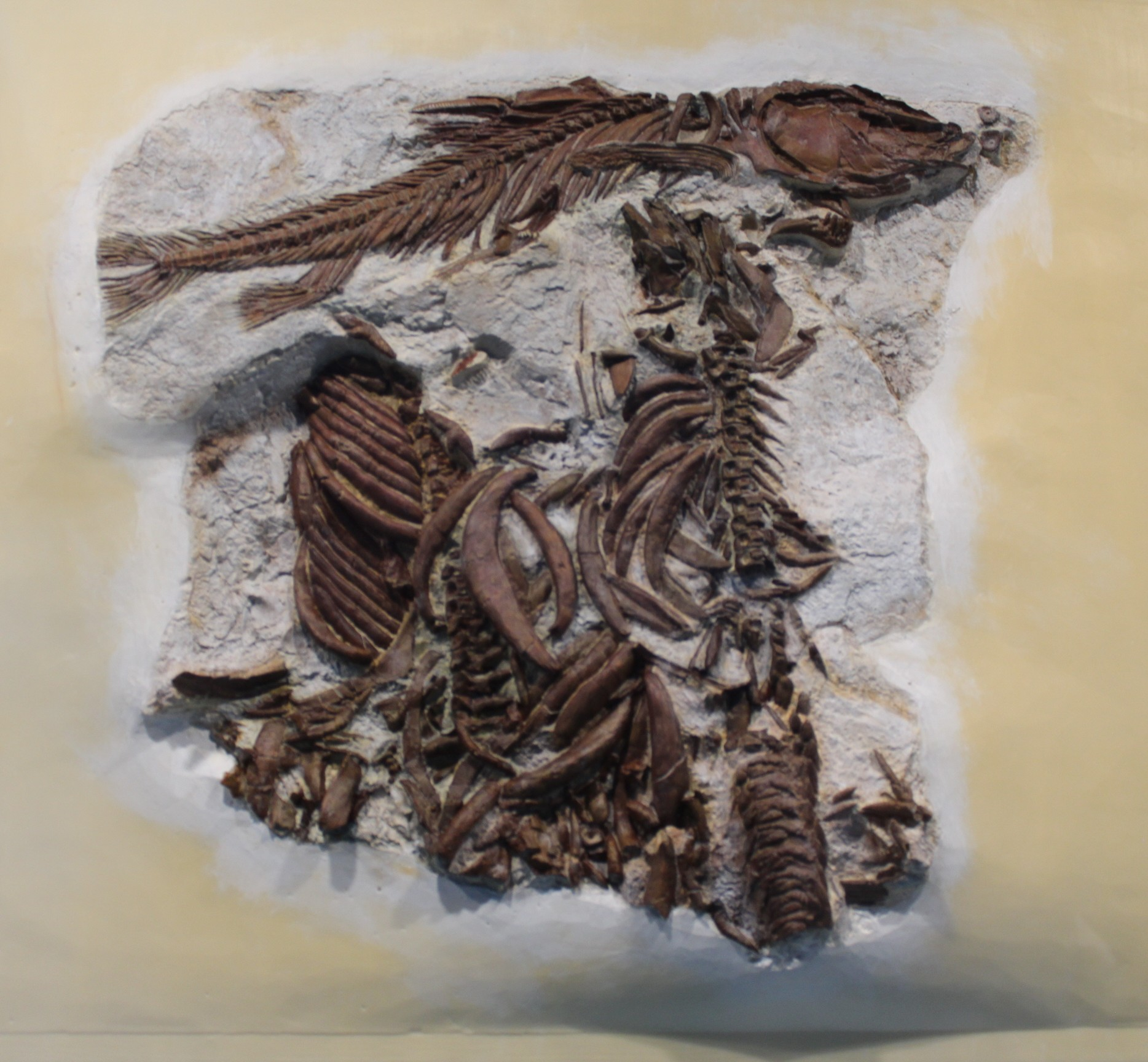
- Fossil specimens at the Baoding Natural History Museum

Scientific classification
- Kingdom: Animalia
- Phylum: Chordata
- Class: Actinopterygii
- Order: Cypriniformes
- Family: Cyprinidae
- Subfamily: Schizothoracinae
- Genus: †Hsianwenia; Chang et al, 2008
- Species: †H. wui

Binomial name
- †Hsianwenia wui Chang et al, 2008

= Hsianwenia =

Hsianwenia Temporal range: Pliocene

Extinct genus of fishes

Hsianwenia wui is an extinct species of cyprinid fish of the subfamily Schizothoracinae from the Pliocene lake deposits of the Qaidam Basin on the northern Tibetan Plateau.

== Taxonomy and classification ==
The genus and species is named in honor of Professor Hsianwen Wu (1900–1985), one of the founders of freshwater fish research in China. Hsianwenia and Plesioschizothorax macrocephalus were found to be intermediate between extant Schizothorax and a clade containing Ptychobarbus, Diptychus, and Gymnocypris, together comprising Schizothoracinae.

== Description ==
This species is characterised by hypercalcified or hyperostotic ribs, which occupy almost the entire body of the fish. The fish seemed to live in a hyper saline environment and the hypertrophic skeleton may have been an adaptation to this habitat; the excess salts absorbed by the fish were deposited in its bones beginning at a certain size or age, leading to "extraordinarily" thickened skeletons in specimens thought to be around 10-15 years old. Hsianwenia wui grew to "more than half a meter long", with complete specimens measuring 450–500 mm (18–20 in) and larger sizes are indicated from incomplete specimens; if these fish grew at a similarly slow rate to extant Schizothoracines, the larger specimens are likely to be older than a decade at the time of death.

A 2022 paper elaborated further on the pachyosty; the dermal skeleton is not noticeably thickened, with only the "endoskeleton" being affected. Furthermore, the ventral intramuscular bones are thicker than the dorsal ones.

== Paleoecology ==
The deposits that Hsianwenia was recovered from are rich in marl and gypsum indicating high concentrations of calcium dissolved in the water; the Yahu Anticline of the Shizigou Formation, which bears fossils of this fish, is around 220 m (720 ft) thick, indicating that the sediments were laid down over a period of up to 200.000 years and the fish was extant for around that time. The shovel-like lower jaw of Hsianwenia along with "intensively" worn teeth indicate that it was a bottom feeder, feeding on algae with a likely preference for hard diatoms. This species seems to have dominated its environment, likely due to the extreme conditions of the waterways, and the thickened skeleton did not hinder its survival due to the lack of predators. The Qaidam Basin would become an arid badlands; the desiccation (drying up) of the waterways sustaining this fish is thought to have resulted in its extinction.
