= Schizothorax lissolabiatus =

Conservation status
- Least Concern (IUCN 3.1)

Scientific classification
- Kingdom: Animalia
- Phylum: Chordata
- Class: Actinopterygii
- Order: Cypriniformes
- Family: Cyprinidae
- Subfamily: Schizothoracinae
- Genus: Schizothorax
- Species: S. lissolabiatus

Binomial name
- Schizothorax lissolabiatus W.-H. Tsao, 1964

Synonyms
- Racoma lissolabiata (Tsao, 1964)

Species of fish

Schizothorax lissolabiatus is a species of ray-finned fish in the genus Schizothorax It is found in the upper reaches of the Mekong River, Black River and Pearl River in Yunnan. It is caught for human consumption.
