= Schizothorax intermedius =

Conservation status
- Least Concern (IUCN 3.1)

Scientific classification
- Kingdom: Animalia
- Phylum: Chordata
- Class: Actinopterygii
- Order: Cypriniformes
- Family: Cyprinidae
- Genus: Schizothorax
- Species: S. intermedius

Binomial name
- Schizothorax intermedius McClelland & Griffith, 1842

Synonyms
- Schizothorax schumacheri Fowler & Steinitz, 1956

Species of fish

Schizothorax intermedius, the Aral Basin snowtrout, is a species of freshwater ray-finned fish belonging to the biology Cyprinidae, the family which includes the carps, barbs and related fishes. This species is found in Central Asia from Afghanistan to Kazakhstan, where it has been recorded in the Syr and Amu Darya river systems, and also in the Talas River endorheic basin.
