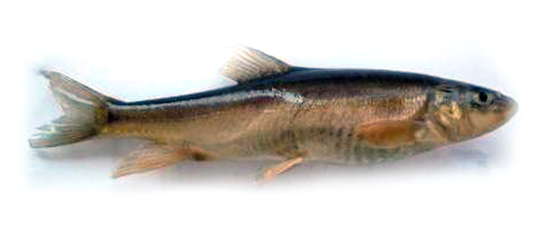

Conservation status
- Vulnerable (IUCN 3.1)

Scientific classification
- Kingdom: Animalia
- Phylum: Chordata
- Class: Actinopterygii
- Order: Cypriniformes
- Family: Cyprinidae
- Subfamily: Schizothoracinae
- Genus: Schizothorax
- Species: S. plagiostomus

Binomial name
- Schizothorax plagiostomus Heckel, 1838

Synonyms
- Oreinus plagiostomus (Heckel, 1838); Schizothorax sinuatus Heckel, 1838; Oreinus sinuatus (Heckel, 1838); Oreinus griffithii McClelland, 1842

= Schizothorax plagiostomus =

Species of fish

Schizothorax plagiostomus is a species of ray-finned fish in the family Cyprinidae. Common names include khont, snow trout, snow carp, snow barbel and swati fish.

== Description ==
Schizothorax plagiostomus has an elongated sub cylindrical body with short, blunt and slightly prognathous upper jaw. Ventral surface of head and anterior part of body flattish, short, somewhat cone shaped and blunt. Snout usually smooth covered with warys in male. Interorbital space broad and flat. Mouth inferior, wide and slightly arched; lips fleshy and continuous, marginally sharply attenuated, lower lip papillae and reflected from jaw, margin of lower lip sharp, covered with firm and hard horny cartilage; a strip of papillae labial plate at chin present. Barbless two pairs. Pharyngeal teeth in three rows. Dorsal fin inserted about opposite to pelvic fins, its last undivided ray osseous, strong and serrated posterior, short than head. Caudal fin deeply emarginated. Scales very small and elliptical; lipids irregular.

In the almost similar appearance of schizothorancine fishes, S. plagiostomus can be separated by its short, deep cornified lower jaw, with a transverse or sometimes only slightly curved sharp cutting margin. The lower and upper lips are connected by a smooth rounded corner. The particular arrangement of lower jaw structure was referred to as "sector mouth".

It weighs up to 2.5 kg (5.5 lb) and reaches 60 cm (24 in) in length. It is sexually mature at 18–24 cm (7.1–9.4 in) length and spawns in natural and artificial environments in two seasons, September–October and March–April. It spawns naturally in clear water on a gravelly or fine pebbled bed at 10–30 cm (3.9–11.8 in) depth. Water current of 2.8–4 m/s (9.2–13.1 ft/s), pH 7.5, dissolved oxygen concentrations of 10–15 mg/L and gravel size of 50–60 mm (2.0–2.4 in) are the optimum conditions for spawning.

== Distribution ==
Schizothorax plagiostomus is found in different rivers, and tributaries throughout Himalaya extending to China, Afghanistan, Pakistan, Turkistan, Nepal, Ladkah, Tibet, Bhutan and north-eastern India. In India, it is the most important food fish of the Himalayan region, including Kashmir, Himachal Pradesh, Uttarakhand, the Uttar Pradesh foothills and Assam. It also plays an important role in commercial fish production. From the subfamily Schizothoracinae, 12 species are reported from Pakistan. The schizothoracine fishes provide a good material to study patterns of evolutionary modifications in terms of their biogeographic distribution. These species are expert in fast running high-elevation streams and rivers and show remarkable fitness for their environment.
