= Schizothorax integrilabiatus =

Conservation status
- Critically Endangered (IUCN 3.1)

Scientific classification
- Kingdom: Animalia
- Phylum: Chordata
- Class: Actinopterygii
- Order: Cypriniformes
- Family: Cyprinidae
- Subfamily: Schizothoracinae
- Genus: Schizothorax
- Species: S. integrilabiatus

Binomial name
- Schizothorax integrilabiatus (Wu et al., 1992)

Synonyms
- Racoma integrilabiata Wu et al., 1992

Species of fish

Schizothorax integrilabiatus is a species of ray-finned fish in the genus Schizothorax. This species is endemic to Tibet where it is found in Xigong Lake and the streams draining into it.
