= Schizothorax nudiventris =

Scientific classification
- Kingdom: Animalia
- Phylum: Chordata
- Class: Actinopterygii
- Order: Cypriniformes
- Family: Cyprinidae
- Subfamily: Schizothoracinae
- Genus: Schizothorax
- Species: S. nudiventris

Binomial name
- Schizothorax nudiventris Jian Yang, X. Y. Chen & J. X. Yang, 2009

Species of fish

Schizothorax nudiventris is a species of ray-finned fish in the genus Schizothorax, from the upper reaches of the Mekong River in China.
