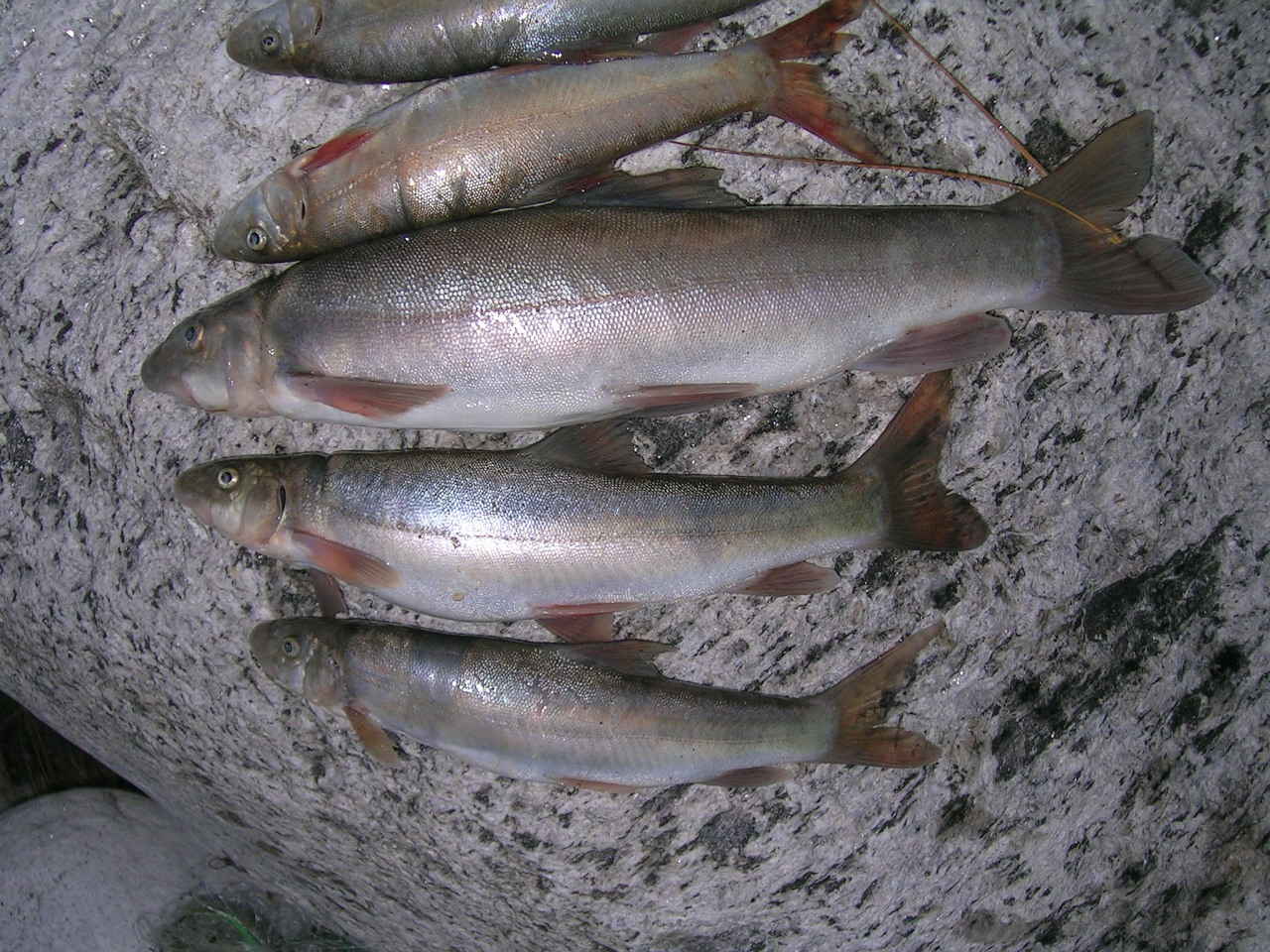
- Schizothorax sp.

Scientific classification
- Kingdom: Animalia
- Phylum: Chordata
- Class: Actinopterygii
- Order: Cypriniformes
- Family: Cyprinidae
- Subfamily: Schizothoracinae
- Genus: Schizothorax; Heckel, 1838

Type species
- Schizothorax plagiostomus Heckel, 1838

Synonyms
- Racoma McClelland & Griffith, 1842

= Schizothorax =

Genus of fishes

Schizothorax is a genus of cyprinid fish found in southern and western China, through northern South Asia (Himalaya) and Central Asia, to Iran. They are primarily found in highland rivers, streams and lakes, although a few species occur in lower-lying locations, like Lake Balkhash and lakes of the Sistan Basin. Their scientific name means "cloven-breast", from Ancient Greek schízeïn (σχίζειν) 'to cleave' and thórax (θώραξ) 'breast-plate' (see also thorax). The western species are typically referred to as marinkas from their Russian name marinka (маринка), while the eastern species are usually called snowtrout. Although they do resemble trouts in habitus this is merely due to convergent evolution and they are by no means closely related apart from both being Teleostei: Cyprinids are in the teleost superorder Ostariophysi, while trouts are in the superorder Protacanthopterygii. Their ancestors must thus have diverged as early as the Triassic, more than 200 million years ago.

Schizothorax is classified within the subfamily Schizothoracinae, the snow barbels, within the family Cyprinidae, the family which includes the carps, barbs and related fishes. This grouping was formerly thought to include the mountain barbels now classified in the subfamily Schizopygopsinae.

== Genomics ==
Genome assemblies of Schizothorax oconnori (2020) and Schizothorax davidi (2026) have provided the first reference genomes for the genus. These genome assemblies provide a foundation for studies of polyploid genome evolution, high-altitude adaptation, and comparative genomics within Schizothorax.

== Species ==
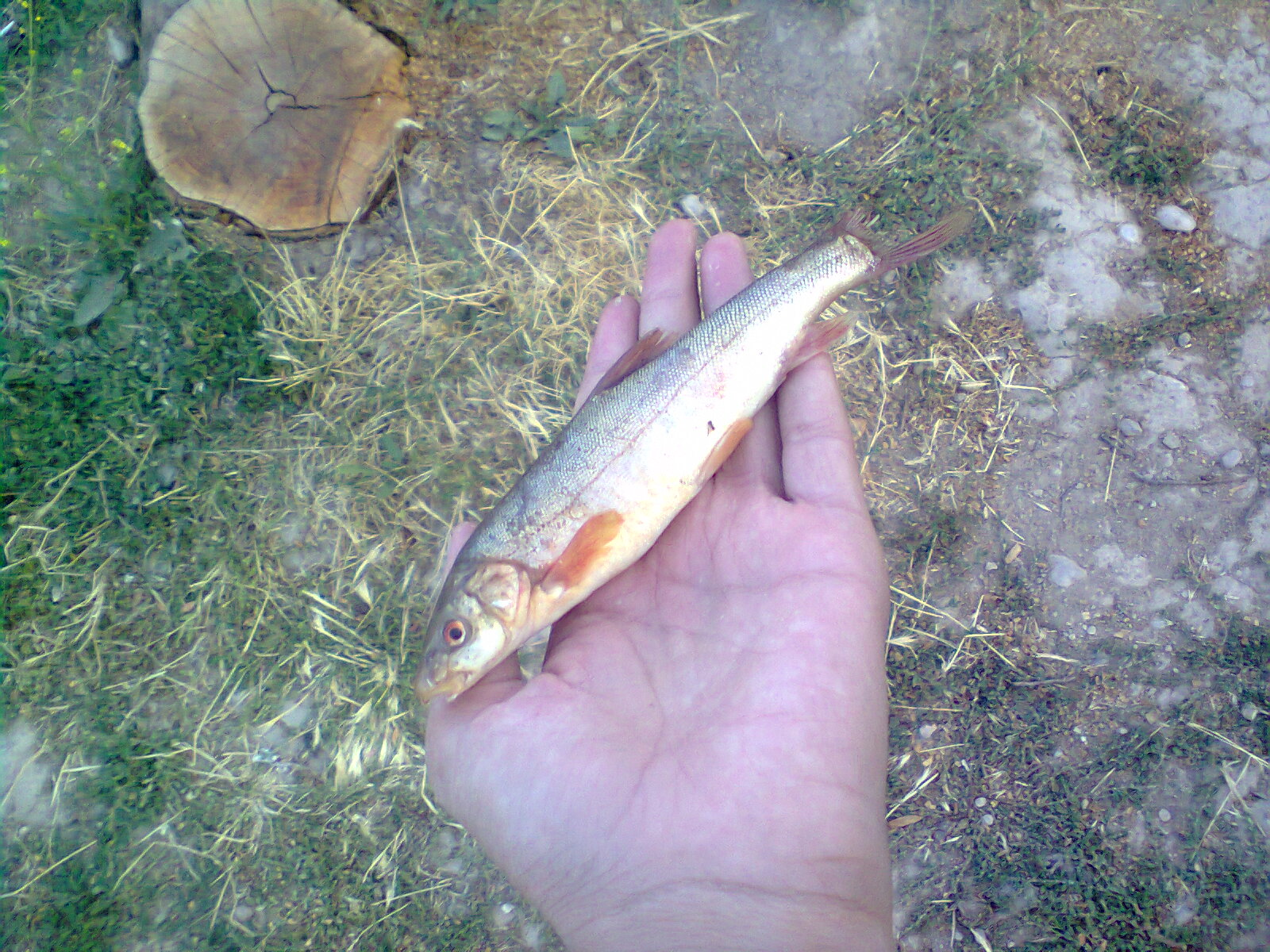
Schizothorax intermedius

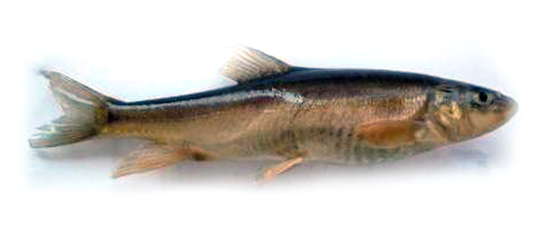
Schizothorax plagiostomus

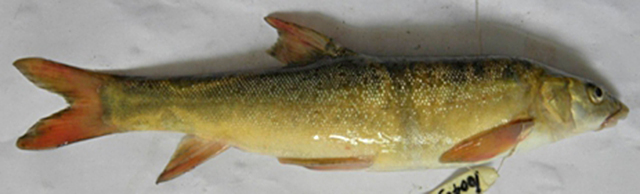
Schizothorax waltoni

These are the currently recognized species in this genus:

- Schizothorax argentatus Kessler, 1874 (Balkhash marinka)
- Schizothorax beipanensis J. Yang, X. Y. Chen & J. X. Yang, 2009
- Schizothorax biddulphi Günther, 1876
- Schizothorax chivae Arunkumar & Moyon, 2016
- Schizothorax chongi (P. W. Fang, 1936)
- Schizothorax cryptolepis T. Y. Fu & M. R. Ye, 1984
- Schizothorax curvilabiatus (Wu & W.-H. Tsao, 1992)
- Schizothorax dainellii Vinciguerra, 1916
- Schizothorax davidi (Sauvage, 1880)
- Schizothorax dolichonema Herzenstein, 1889
- Schizothorax dulongensis S. Y. Huang, 1985
- Schizothorax edenianus McClelland, 1842
- Schizothorax elongatus S. Y. Huang, 1985
- Schizothorax esocinus Heckel, 1838 (Chirruh snowtrout)
- Schizothorax eurystomus Kessler, 1872
- Schizothorax fedtschenkoi Kessler, 1872
- Schizothorax gongshanensis W.-H. Tsao, 1964
- Schizothorax grahami (Regan, 1904)
- Schizothorax griseus Pellegrin, 1931
- Schizothorax gulinensis R. H. Ding, X. Y. Dai & W. Y. Huang, 2022
- Schizothorax heteri J. Yang, L. P. Zheng, ZX. Y. Chen & J. X. Yang, 2013
- Schizothorax heterochilus M. R. Ye & T. Y. Fu, 1986
- Schizothorax heterophysallidos J. Yang, X. Y. Chen & J. X. Yang, 2009
- Schizothorax huegelii Heckel, 1838
- Schizothorax integrilabiatus (Y. F. Wu et al., 1992)
- Schizothorax intermedius McClelland & Griffith, 1842
- Schizothorax kozlovi Nikolskii, 1903
- Schizothorax kumaonensis Menon, 1971 (Kumaon snowtrout)
- Schizothorax labiatus (McClelland, 1842) (Kunar snowtrout)
- Schizothorax labrosus Y. H. Wang, D. D. Zhuang & L. C. Gao, 1981
- Schizothorax lantsangensis W.-H. Tsao, 1964
- Schizothorax lepidothorax J. X. Yang, 1991
- Schizothorax leukus J. Yang, L. P. Zheng, X. Y. Chen & J. X. Yang, 2013
- Schizothorax lissolabiatus W.-H. Tsao, 1964
- Schizothorax longibarbus (P. W. Fang, 1936)
- Schizothorax macrophthalmus Terashima, 1984 (Nepalese snowtrout)
- Schizothorax macropogon Regan, 1905
- Schizothorax malacathus S. Y. Huang, 1985
- Schizothorax meridionalis W.-H. Tsao, 1964
- Schizothorax microcephalus F. Day, 1877
- Schizothorax microstomus S. Y. Huang, 1982
- Schizothorax molesworthi (B. L. Chaudhuri, 1913) (Blunt-nosed snowtrout)
- Schizothorax myzostomus W.-H. Tsao, 1964
- Schizothorax nasus Heckel, 1838 (Dongu snowtrout)
- Schizothorax nepalensis Terashima, 1984
- Schizothorax niger Heckel, 1838 (Alghad snowtrout)
- Schizothorax ninglangensis Y. H. Wang, K. X. Zhang & D. D. Zhuang, 1981
- Schizothorax nudiventris J. Yang, X. Y. Chen & J. X. Yang, 2009
- Schizothorax nukiangensis W.-H. Tsao, 1964
- Schizothorax oconnori Lloyd, 1908
- Schizothorax oligolepis S. Y. Huang, 1985
- Schizothorax parvus W.-H. Tsao, 1964
- Schizothorax pelzami Kessler, 1870 (Transcaspian marinka)
- Schizothorax plagiostomus Heckel, 1838
- Schizothorax prenanti (T. L. Tchang, 1930)
- Schizothorax progastus (McClelland, 1839) (Dinnawah snowtrout)
- Schizothorax pseudoaksaiensis Herzenstein, 1889 (Ili marinka)
- Schizothorax puncticulatus C. G. Zhang, Y. H. Zhao & C. Y. Niu, 2019
- Schizothorax ramzani (Javed, Ullah & Pervaiz, 2012)
- Schizothorax raraensis Terashima, 1984 (Rara snowtrout)
- Schizothorax richardsonii (J. E. Gray, 1832) (Common snowtrout)
- Schizothorax rotundimaxillaris Y. F. Wu & C. Z. Wu, 1992
- †Schizothorax saltans Regan, 1905
- Schizothorax sinensis Herzenstein, 1889
- Schizothorax skarduensis Mirza & A. A. Awan, 1978
- Schizothorax taliensis Regan, 1907
- Schizothorax waltoni Regan, 1905
- Schizothorax wangchiachii (P. W. Fang, 1936)
- Schizothorax yunnanensis Norman, 1923
- Schizothorax zarudnyi (Nikolskii, 1897)
