= Schizothorax kozlovi =

Conservation status
- Endangered (IUCN 3.1)

Scientific classification
- Kingdom: Animalia
- Phylum: Chordata
- Class: Actinopterygii
- Order: Cypriniformes
- Family: Cyprinidae
- Subfamily: Schizothoracinae
- Genus: Schizothorax
- Species: S. kozlovi

Binomial name
- Schizothorax kozlovi A. M. Nikolskii, 1903

Species of fish

Schizothorax kozlovi is a species of ray-finned fish in the genus Schizothorax from China.
