= Schizothorax oligolepis =

Conservation status
- Vulnerable (IUCN 3.1)

Scientific classification
- Kingdom: Animalia
- Phylum: Chordata
- Class: Actinopterygii
- Order: Cypriniformes
- Family: Cyprinidae
- Subfamily: Schizothoracinae
- Genus: Schizothorax
- Species: S. oligolepis

Binomial name
- Schizothorax oligolepis S. Y. Huang, 1985

Species of fish

Schizothorax oligolepis is a species of ray-finned fish in the genus Schizothorax. This species is found in the upper Irrawaddy River basin in Yunnan and the Putao District in Myanmar.
