= Schizothorax davidi =

Conservation status
- Vulnerable (IUCN 3.1)

Scientific classification
- Kingdom: Animalia
- Phylum: Chordata
- Class: Actinopterygii
- Order: Cypriniformes
- Family: Cyprinidae
- Subfamily: Schizothoracinae
- Genus: Schizothorax
- Species: S. davidi

Binomial name
- Schizothorax davidi (Sauvage, 1880)

Species of fish

Schizothorax davidi is a species of ray-finned fish in the genus Schizothorax that is endemic to the upper Yangtze River drainage in the Chinese provinces of Sichuan, Yunnan, and Gansu. It is an economically important cold-water fish endemic to the Tibetan Plateau region.

== Genomics ==
A haplotype-resolved chromosome-level genome assembly of Schizothorax davidi was published in 2026, providing the first reference genome for the species. The genome is approximately 3.7 Gb in size and comprises 98 chromosomes. The assembly has a BUSCO completeness of 99.0% and contains 98,079 predicted protein-coding genes.
