= Schizothorax myzostomus =

Conservation status
- Least Concern (IUCN 3.1)

Scientific classification
- Kingdom: Animalia
- Phylum: Chordata
- Class: Actinopterygii
- Order: Cypriniformes
- Family: Cyprinidae
- Subfamily: Schizothoracinae
- Genus: Schizothorax
- Species: S. myzostomus

Binomial name
- Schizothorax myzostomus W.-H. Tsao, 1964

Species of fish

Schizothorax myzostomus is a species of ray-finned fish in the genus Schizothorax which is found in Yunnan.
