= Schizothorax lepidothorax =

Conservation status
- Endangered (IUCN 2.3)

Scientific classification
- Kingdom: Animalia
- Phylum: Chordata
- Class: Actinopterygii
- Order: Cypriniformes
- Family: Cyprinidae
- Subfamily: Schizothoracinae
- Genus: Schizothorax
- Species: S. lepidothorax

Binomial name
- Schizothorax lepidothorax J. X. Yang, 1991

Species of fish

Schizothorax lepidothorax is a species of ray-finned fish in the family Cyprinidae. The species is only known from Fuxian Lake in Yunnan.
