= Schizothorax dainellii =

Scientific classification
- Kingdom: Animalia
- Phylum: Chordata
- Class: Actinopterygii
- Order: Cypriniformes
- Family: Cyprinidae
- Subfamily: Schizothoracinae
- Genus: Schizothorax
- Species: S. dainellii

Binomial name
- Schizothorax dainellii (Vinciguerra, 1916)

Synonyms
- Schizothorax dainellii Vinciguerra, 1916

Species of fish

Schizothorax dainellii is a species of cyprinid freshwater fish found in the Indus basin in Pakistan.
