= Schizothorax prenanti =

Conservation status
- Endangered (IUCN 3.1)

Scientific classification
- Kingdom: Animalia
- Phylum: Chordata
- Class: Actinopterygii
- Order: Cypriniformes
- Family: Cyprinidae
- Subfamily: Schizothoracinae
- Genus: Schizothorax
- Species: S. prenanti

Binomial name
- Schizothorax prenanti (T. L. Tchang, 1930)

Synonyms
- Oreinus prenanti Tchang, 1930; Racoma prenanti (Tchang, 1930)

Species of fish

Schizothorax prenanti, also known as Ya-fish, is a species of ray-finned fish in the genus Schizothorax from the middle and upper parts of the Yangtze basin in China. It is also known as Yayu, as it is native to the city of Ya'an, Sichuan.
