= Schizothorax lantsangensis =

Conservation status
- Data Deficient (IUCN 3.1)

Scientific classification
- Kingdom: Animalia
- Phylum: Chordata
- Class: Actinopterygii
- Order: Cypriniformes
- Family: Cyprinidae
- Subfamily: Schizothoracinae
- Genus: Schizothorax
- Species: S. lantsangensis

Binomial name
- Schizothorax lantsangensis W.-H. Tsao, 1964

Synonyms
- Racoma lantsangensis (Tsao, 1964)

Species of fish

Schizothorax lantsangensis is a species of ray-finned fish in the genus Schizothorax which is endemic to the upper Mekong River basin in Yunnan.
