= Schizothorax elongatus =

Conservation status
- Endangered (IUCN 3.1)

Scientific classification
- Kingdom: Animalia
- Phylum: Chordata
- Class: Actinopterygii
- Order: Cypriniformes
- Family: Cyprinidae
- Subfamily: Schizothoracinae
- Genus: Schizothorax
- Species: S. elongatus

Binomial name
- Schizothorax elongatus S. Y. Huang, 1985

Species of fish

Schizothorax elongatus is a species of ray-finned fish in the genus Schizothorax from Yingjiang County in Yunnan.
