= Schizothorax parvus =

Conservation status
- Endangered (IUCN 3.1)

Scientific classification
- Kingdom: Animalia
- Phylum: Chordata
- Class: Actinopterygii
- Order: Cypriniformes
- Family: Cyprinidae
- Subfamily: Schizothoracinae
- Genus: Schizothorax
- Species: S. parvus

Binomial name
- Schizothorax parvus W.-H. Tsao, 1964

Synonyms
- Racoma parva (Tsao, 1964)

Species of fish

Schizothorax parvus is a species of ray-finned fish in the genus Schizothorax from Yunnan.
