= Schizothorax heterochilus =

Conservation status
- Least Concern (IUCN 3.1)

Scientific classification
- Kingdom: Animalia
- Phylum: Chordata
- Class: Actinopterygii
- Order: Cypriniformes
- Family: Cyprinidae
- Subfamily: Schizothoracinae
- Genus: Schizothorax
- Species: S. heterochilus

Binomial name
- Schizothorax heterochilus M. R. Ye & T. Y. Fu, 1986

Species of fish

Schizothorax heterochilus is a species of ray-finned fish in the genus Schizothorax from the upper parts of the Yangtze basin in China.
