= Schizothorax dolichonema =

Conservation status
- Endangered (IUCN 3.1)

Scientific classification
- Kingdom: Animalia
- Phylum: Chordata
- Class: Actinopterygii
- Order: Cypriniformes
- Family: Cyprinidae
- Subfamily: Schizothoracinae
- Genus: Schizothorax
- Species: S. dolichonema

Binomial name
- Schizothorax dolichonema Herzenstein, 1889

Synonyms
- Racoma dolichonema (Herzenstein, 1889)

Species of fish

Schizothorax dolichonema is a species of ray-finned fish in the genus Schizothorax from the upper parts of the Yangtze basin in China.
