= Schizothorax leukus =

Scientific classification
- Domain: Eukaryota
- Kingdom: Animalia
- Phylum: Chordata
- Class: Actinopterygii
- Order: Cypriniformes
- Family: Cyprinidae
- Subfamily: Schizothoracinae
- Genus: Schizothorax
- Species: S. leukus

Binomial name
- Schizothorax leukus Yang, Zhen, Chen & Yang, 2013

Species of fish

Schizothorax leukus is a species of ray-finned fish in the genus Schizothorax. It is found in the Irrawaddy River drainage in China.
