= Schizothorax longibarbus =

Conservation status
- Critically Endangered (IUCN 3.1)

Scientific classification
- Kingdom: Animalia
- Phylum: Chordata
- Class: Actinopterygii
- Order: Cypriniformes
- Family: Cyprinidae
- Subfamily: Schizothoracinae
- Genus: Schizothorax
- Species: S. longibarbus

Binomial name
- Schizothorax longibarbus (P. W. Fang, 1936)

Synonyms
- Oreinus longibarbus Fang, 1936; Racoma longibarba (Fang, 1936)

Species of fish

Schizothorax longibarbus is a species of ray-finned fish in the genus Schizothorax. This species is known only from a single locality in the Dadu He flowing into the Min Jiang, a tributary of the Chang Jiang in Sichuan.
