= Schizothorax ramzani =

Scientific classification
- Domain: Eukaryota
- Kingdom: Animalia
- Phylum: Chordata
- Class: Actinopterygii
- Order: Cypriniformes
- Family: Cyprinidae
- Subfamily: Schizothoracinae
- Genus: Schizothorax
- Species: S. ramzani

Binomial name
- Schizothorax ramzani (Javed, Azizullah & Pervaiz, 2012)

Synonyms
- Racoma ramzani Javed, Azizullah & Pervaiz, 2012

Species of fish

Schizothorax ramzani is a species of ray-finned fish in the genus Schizothorax found in the Indus River in Pakistan.
