= Schizothorax heteri =

Scientific classification
- Kingdom: Animalia
- Phylum: Chordata
- Class: Actinopterygii
- Order: Cypriniformes
- Family: Cyprinidae
- Subfamily: Schizothoracinae
- Genus: Schizothorax
- Species: S. heteri

Binomial name
- Schizothorax heteri J. Yang, L. P. Zheng, X. Y. Chen & J. X. Yang, 2013

Species of fish

Schizothorax heteri is a species of ray-finned fish in the genus Schizothorax. It is found in the Irrawaddy River drainage in China.
