= Kumaon snowtrout =

Conservation status
- Data Deficient (IUCN 3.1)

Scientific classification
- Kingdom: Animalia
- Phylum: Chordata
- Class: Actinopterygii
- Order: Cypriniformes
- Family: Cyprinidae
- Subfamily: Schizothoracinae
- Genus: Schizothorax
- Species: S. kumaonensis

Binomial name
- Schizothorax kumaonensis Menon, 1971

Synonyms
- Oreinus kumaonensis (Menon, 1971)

Species of fish

The Kumaon snowtrout (Schizothorax kumaonensis) is a species of ray-finned fish in the genus Schizothorax.

The Latin specific epithet kumaonensis refers the Kumaon division in Uttarakhand, India.
