= Dongu snowtrout =

Conservation status
- Least Concern (IUCN 3.1)

Scientific classification
- Kingdom: Animalia
- Phylum: Chordata
- Class: Actinopterygii
- Division: Teleostei
- Order: Cypriniformes
- Family: Cyprinidae
- Subfamily: Schizothoracinae
- Genus: Schizothorax
- Species: S. nasus

Binomial name
- Schizothorax nasus Heckel, 1838

Synonyms
- Schizothoraichthys nasus (Heckel, 1838)

Species of fish

The Dongu snowtrout (Schizothorax nasus) is a species of ray-finned fish in the genus Schizothorax. It is found in the upper drainage system of the Indus River in China, India and Pakistan.
