= Schizothorax fedtschenkoi =

Conservation status
- Least Concern (IUCN 3.1)

Scientific classification
- Kingdom: Animalia
- Phylum: Chordata
- Class: Actinopterygii
- Order: Cypriniformes
- Family: Cyprinidae
- Genus: Schizothorax
- Species: S. fedtschenkoi

Binomial name
- Schizothorax fedtschenkoi Kessler, 1872

Species of fish

Schizothorax fedtschenkoi is a species of freshwater ray-finned fish belonging to the biology Cyprinidae, the family which includes the carps, barbs and related fishes. This species is endemic to Zeravshan River drainage in Uzbekistan and Tajikistan.
