= Schizothorax griseus =

Conservation status
- Least Concern (IUCN 3.1)

Scientific classification
- Kingdom: Animalia
- Phylum: Chordata
- Class: Actinopterygii
- Order: Cypriniformes
- Family: Cyprinidae
- Subfamily: Schizothoracinae
- Genus: Schizothorax
- Species: S. griseus

Binomial name
- Schizothorax griseus Pellegrin, 1931

Synonyms
- Racoma grisea (Pellegrin, 1931)

Species of fish

Schizothorax griseus is a species of ray-finned fish in the genus Schizothorax. It is found in the basins of the Yangtze River basin, the upper Pearl River and the upper Mekong River in southern China.
