= Schizothorax microstomus =

Conservation status
- Critically Endangered (IUCN 3.1)

Scientific classification
- Kingdom: Animalia
- Phylum: Chordata
- Class: Actinopterygii
- Order: Cypriniformes
- Family: Cyprinidae
- Subfamily: Schizothoracinae
- Genus: Schizothorax
- Species: S. microstomus

Binomial name
- Schizothorax microstomus S. Y. Hwang, 1982

Species of fish

Schizothorax microstomus is a species of ray-finned fish in the genus Schizothorax from Lugu Lake, Ninglang, Yunnan.
