= Blunt-nosed snowtrout =

Conservation status
- Data Deficient (IUCN 3.1)

Scientific classification
- Kingdom: Animalia
- Phylum: Chordata
- Class: Actinopterygii
- Order: Cypriniformes
- Family: Cyprinidae
- Subfamily: Schizothoracinae
- Genus: Schizothorax
- Species: S. molesworthi

Binomial name
- Schizothorax molesworthi (B. L. Chaudhuri, 1913)

Synonyms
- Oreinus molesworthi Chaudhuri, 1913

Species of fish

The blunt-nosed snowtrout (Schizothorax molesworthi) is a species of ray-finned fish in the genus Schizothorax from the Brahmaputra River drainage in India and China, where it is heavily exploited for food.
