= Schizothorax curvilabiatus =

Conservation status
- Data Deficient (IUCN 3.1)

Scientific classification
- Kingdom: Animalia
- Phylum: Chordata
- Class: Actinopterygii
- Order: Cypriniformes
- Family: Cyprinidae
- Subfamily: Schizothoracinae
- Genus: Schizothorax
- Species: S. curvilabiatus

Binomial name
- Schizothorax curvilabiatus (Wu & W.-H. Tsao, 1992)

Synonyms
- Racoma curvilabiata Wu & Tsao in Wu & Wu, 1992

Species of fish in the genus Schizothorax

Schizothorax curvilabiatus is a species of ray-finned fish in the genus Schizothorax. It is found in the lower reaches of the Yarlung Tsangpo River and in Tibet where it is found the shallower areas of relatively fast-flowing streams and rivers which have stream beds of gravel or rock.
