= Schizothorax heterophysallidos =

Scientific classification
- Kingdom: Animalia
- Phylum: Chordata
- Class: Actinopterygii
- Order: Cypriniformes
- Family: Cyprinidae
- Subfamily: Schizothoracinae
- Genus: Schizothorax
- Species: S. heterophysallidos

Binomial name
- Schizothorax heterophysallidos Jian Yang, X. Y. Chen & J. X. Yang, 2009

Species of fish

Schizothorax heterophysallidos is a species of ray-finned fish in the genus Schizothorax from the upper reaches of the Nanpan River in Yunnan.
