= Schizothorax biddulphi =

Conservation status
- Critically Endangered (IUCN 3.1)

Scientific classification
- Kingdom: Animalia
- Phylum: Chordata
- Class: Actinopterygii
- Order: Cypriniformes
- Family: Cyprinidae
- Subfamily: Schizothoracinae
- Genus: Schizothorax
- Species: S. biddulphi

Binomial name
- Schizothorax biddulphi Günther, 1876

Synonyms
- Racoma biddulphi (Günther, 1876); Schizothorax lacustris Kessler, 1879; Schizothorax tarimi Kessler, 1879; Schizothorax microlepidotus Kessler, 1879; Schizothorax altior Herzenstein, 1889; Schizothorax dayi Herzenstein, 1889

Species of fish

Schizothorax biddulphi is a species of ray-finned fish in the genus Schizothorax from the family Cyprinidae. It is found in the Tarim River and Boston Lake in Xijiang, China. Where it occurs in rivers and lakes with little or no current where it feeds on benthic invertebrates, algae and small fragments of macrophytes.
