= Schizothorax yunnanensis =

Conservation status
- Data Deficient (IUCN 3.1)

Scientific classification
- Kingdom: Animalia
- Phylum: Chordata
- Class: Actinopterygii
- Order: Cypriniformes
- Family: Cyprinidae
- Subfamily: Schizothoracinae
- Genus: Schizothorax
- Species: S. yunnanensis

Binomial name
- Schizothorax yunnanensis Norman, 1923

Synonyms
- Racoma yunnanensis (Norman, 1923)

Species of fish

Schizothorax yunnanensis is a species of ray-finned fish in the genus Schizothorax which is found in Yunnan.
