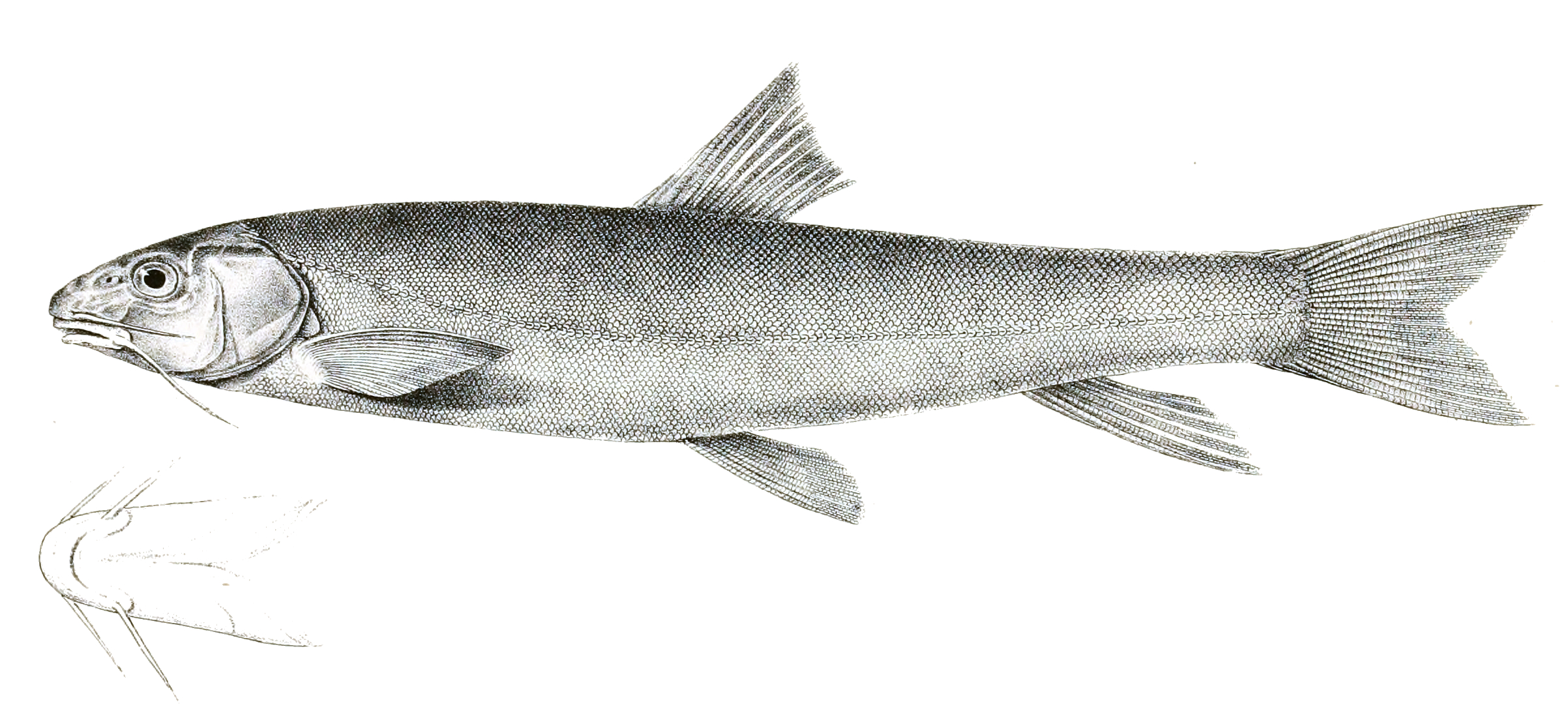

Scientific classification
- Kingdom: Animalia
- Phylum: Chordata
- Class: Actinopterygii
- Order: Cypriniformes
- Family: Cyprinidae
- Subfamily: Schizothoracinae
- Genus: Schizothorax
- Species: S. microcephalus

Binomial name
- Schizothorax microcephalus F. Day, 1877

= Schizothorax microcephalus =

Species of fish

Schizothorax microcephalus is a species of ray-finned fish in the genus Schizothorax from the Panj River.
