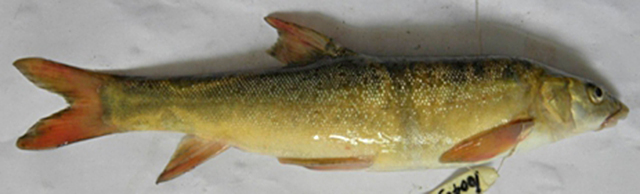

Conservation status
- Least Concern (IUCN 3.1)

Scientific classification
- Kingdom: Animalia
- Phylum: Chordata
- Class: Actinopterygii
- Order: Cypriniformes
- Family: Cyprinidae
- Subfamily: Schizothoracinae
- Genus: Schizothorax
- Species: S. waltoni

Binomial name
- Schizothorax waltoni Regan, 1905

Synonyms
- Racoma waltoni (Regan, 1905); Oreinus baileyi Lloyd, 1908; Schizothorax baileyi (Lloyd, 1908)

= Schizothorax waltoni =

Species of fish

Schizothorax waltoni is a species of ray-finned fish in the genus Schizothorax from the Brahmaputra River in Tibet.
