= Schizothorax chongi =

Conservation status
- Vulnerable (IUCN 3.1)

Scientific classification
- Kingdom: Animalia
- Phylum: Chordata
- Class: Actinopterygii
- Order: Cypriniformes
- Family: Cyprinidae
- Subfamily: Schizothoracinae
- Genus: Schizothorax
- Species: S. chongi

Binomial name
- Schizothorax chongi (P. W. Fang, 1936)

Synonyms
- Oreinus chongi Fang, 1936; Racoma chongi (Fang, 1936)

Species of fish

Schizothorax chongi is a species of ray-finned fish in the genus Schizothorax from the upper parts of the Yangtze basin in China.
