= Schizothorax beipanensis =

Conservation status
- Least Concern (IUCN 3.1)

Scientific classification
- Kingdom: Animalia
- Phylum: Chordata
- Class: Actinopterygii
- Order: Cypriniformes
- Family: Cyprinidae
- Subfamily: Schizothoracinae
- Genus: Schizothorax
- Species: S. beipanensis

Binomial name
- Schizothorax beipanensis Jian Yang, X. Y. Chen & J. X. Yang, 2009

Species of fish

Schizothorax beipanensis is a species of ray-finned fish in the genus Schizothorax which is found in the upper tributaries of the Beipan River in China.
