= Schizothorax zarudnyi =

Scientific classification
- Kingdom: Animalia
- Phylum: Chordata
- Class: Actinopterygii
- Order: Cypriniformes
- Family: Cyprinidae
- Subfamily: Schizothoracinae
- Genus: Schizothorax
- Species: S. zarudnyi

Binomial name
- Schizothorax zarudnyi (A. M. Nikolskii, 1897)

Synonyms
- Aspiostoma zarudnyi Nikolskii, 1897; Schizopyge zarudny (Nikolskii, 1897); Barbus microlepis Keyserling, 1861; Oreinus anjac Fowler, 1956

Species of fish

Schizothorax zarudnyi is a species of cyprinid freshwater fish from Iran and Afghanistan, where restricted to lakes in the Sistan Basin.

== Etymology ==
The fish is named in honor of Nikolai Zarudny (1859-1919), a Ukrainian-Russian explorer and ornithologist, who collected the holotype specimens.
