= Schizothorax cryptolepis =

Scientific classification
- Domain: Eukaryota
- Kingdom: Animalia
- Phylum: Chordata
- Class: Actinopterygii
- Order: Cypriniformes
- Family: Cyprinidae
- Subfamily: Schizothoracinae
- Genus: Schizothorax
- Species: S. cryptolepis

Binomial name
- Schizothorax cryptolepis T. Y. Fu & M. R. Ye, 1984

Species of fish

Schizothorax cryptolepis is a species of cyprinid fish in the genus Schizothorax from the upper parts of the Yangtze basin in China.
