= Nikolai Zarudny =

Ukrainian-Russian zoologist and explorer (1859-1919)

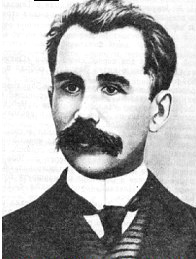
Nikolai Zarudny

Nikolai Alekseyvich Zarudny (Russian: Николай Алексеевич Зарудный; (Note: Russian: Николай Алексеевич Зарудный, romanized: Nikolay Alekseevich Zarudny. His name has been transliterated a number of other ways; especially with Sarudny or Sarudney in older works.) 25 September 1859 – 17 March 1919) was a Ukrainian-Russian explorer and zoologist who studied the flora and fauna of Central Asia.

He was born in Gryakovo, Kharkov Governorate, Russian Empire (now in Poltava Oblast of Ukraine). He wrote his first ornithology book in 1896 and made five expeditions in the Caspian region between 1884 and 1892. He led other expeditions to Persia supported by the Russian Geographical Society and the Zoological Museum of the Zoological Institute of the Russian Academy of Sciences. He collected nearly 3,140 specimens of birds and 50,000 insects. After the Russian Revolution, his collection was nationalized by the Bolsheviks and moved to the museum at the University of Tashkent. For his work, the Russian Geographical Society awarded him the Przhevalsky Medal. His last work on the ornithology of Turkestan region was not completed as he died of accidental poisoning. He published 218 monographs in the course of his life and named many species.

== Eponymous taxa ==
Among the species and other taxa named after Zarudny are

- Eumeces schneiderii zarudnyi,
- Zarudny's jird,
- Zarudny's rock shrew,
- Zarudny's worm lizard,
- The Freshwater fish Schizothorax zarudnyi (Nikolskii 1897)
- and the distinctive Asian subspecies of the desert sparrow (Passer simplex zarudnyi).
