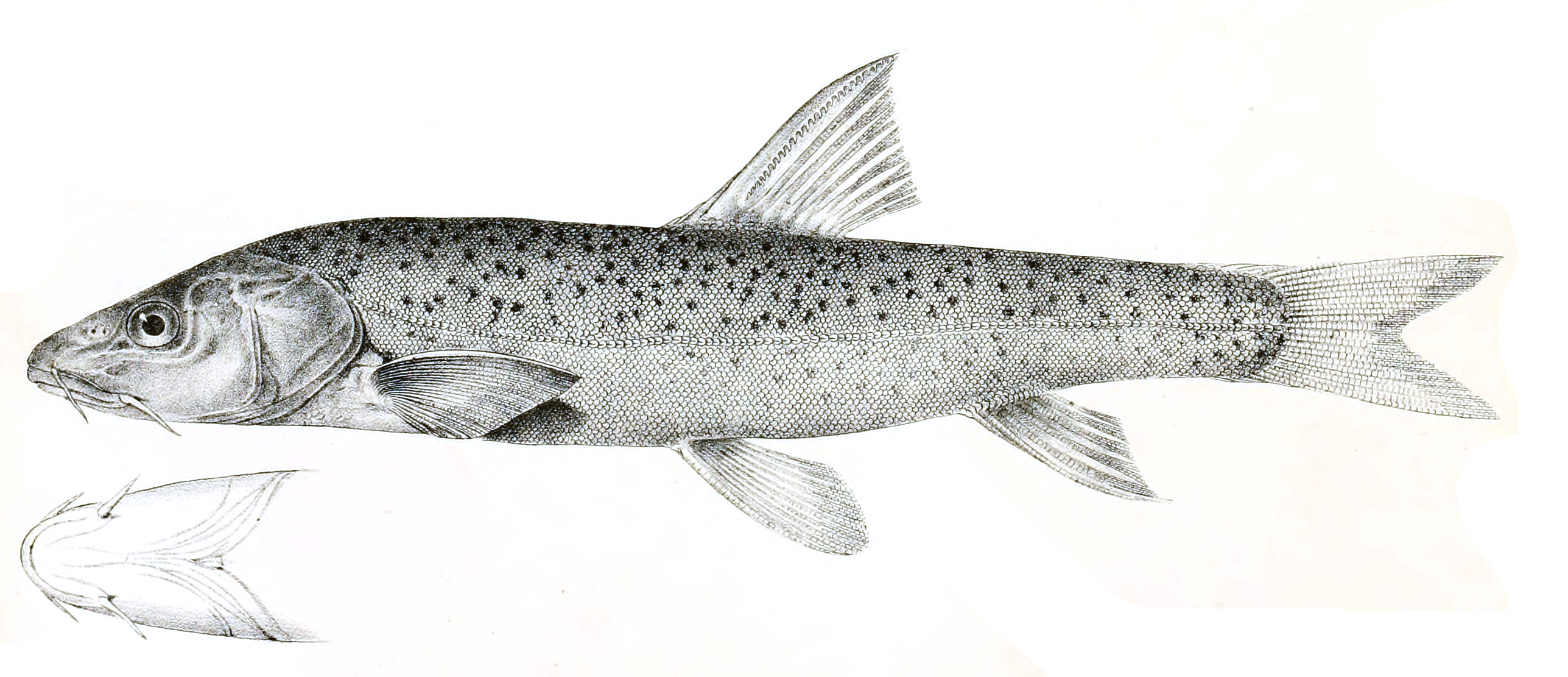

Conservation status
- Vulnerable (IUCN 3.1)

Scientific classification
- Kingdom: Animalia
- Phylum: Chordata
- Class: Actinopterygii
- Division: Teleostei
- Order: Cypriniformes
- Family: Cyprinidae
- Genus: Schizothorax
- Species: S. esocinus

Binomial name
- Schizothorax esocinus (Heckel, 1838)

Synonyms
- Racoma esocina (Heckel, 1838); Schizopyge esocinus (Heckel, 1838); Schizothoraichthys esocinus (Heckel, 1838); Schizothorax barbatus McClelland & Griffith, 1842; Racoma nobilis McClelland, 1842; Schizothorax nobilis (McClelland, 1842); Schizothorax punctatus Day, 1877; Schizothorax montanus Zugmayer, 1909

= Chirruh snowtrout =

Species of fish

The Chirruh snowtrout (Schizothorax esocinus) is a species of cyprinid fish found in the Himalyays in Pakistan, India, Afghanistan, Nepal and China.

== Biology ==
Found mostly in mountain streams, rivers and gravel-bottomed rivers. They feed on bottom detritus and they migrate to spawn in tributary streams where breeding occurs in gravel and sandy beds.
