= Schizothorax huegelii =

Conservation status
- Endangered (IUCN 3.1)

Scientific classification
- Kingdom: Animalia
- Phylum: Chordata
- Class: Actinopterygii
- Order: Cypriniformes
- Family: Cyprinidae
- Genus: Schizothorax
- Species: S. huegelii

Binomial name
- Schizothorax huegelii Heckel, 1838

Species of fish

Schizothorax huegelii is a species of ray-finned fish in the genus Schizothorax which is found in Jammu and Kashmir where it inhabits mountain streams and lakes.
