= Schizothorax rotundimaxillaris =

Scientific classification
- Kingdom: Animalia
- Phylum: Chordata
- Class: Actinopterygii
- Order: Cypriniformes
- Family: Cyprinidae
- Genus: Schizothorax
- Species: S. rotundimaxillaris

Binomial name
- Schizothorax rotundimaxillaris Y. F. Wu & C. Z. Wu, 1992

Species of fish

Schizothorax rotundimaxillaris is a species of ray-finned fish in the genus Schizothorax from Yunnan.
