= Schizothorax oconnori =

Conservation status
- Least Concern (IUCN 3.1)

Scientific classification
- Kingdom: Animalia
- Phylum: Chordata
- Class: Actinopterygii
- Order: Cypriniformes
- Family: Cyprinidae
- Genus: Schizothorax
- Species: S. oconnori

Binomial name
- Schizothorax oconnori Lloyd, 1908

Synonyms
- Aspiorhynchus oconnori (Lloyd, 1908); Racoma oconnori (Lloyd, 1908)

Species of fish

Schizothorax oconnori is a species of ray-finned fish in the genus Schizothorax that is endemic to the upper Brahmaputra River drainage on the Tibetan Plateau.

== Genomics ==
A genome assembly of Schizothorax oconnori was published in 2020, providing the first reference genome for the species. The genome is approximately 1.94 Gb in size and comprises 24 pseudo-chromosomes. The assembly has a BUSCO completeness of 96.4% and contains 43,731 predicted protein-coding genes.
