= Schizothorax dulongensis =

Scientific classification
- Domain: Eukaryota
- Kingdom: Animalia
- Phylum: Chordata
- Class: Actinopterygii
- Order: Cypriniformes
- Family: Cyprinidae
- Genus: Schizothorax
- Species: S. dulongensis

Binomial name
- Schizothorax dulongensis S. Y. Huang, 1985

Species of fish

Schizothorax dulongensis is a species of ray-finned fish in the genus Schizothorax which occurs in Yunnan in China..
