= Schizothorax ninglangensis =

Conservation status
- Critically Endangered (IUCN 3.1)

Scientific classification
- Kingdom: Animalia
- Phylum: Chordata
- Class: Actinopterygii
- Order: Cypriniformes
- Family: Cyprinidae
- Genus: Schizothorax
- Species: S. ninglangensis

Binomial name
- Schizothorax ninglangensis Y. H. Wang, K. X. Zhang & D. D. Zhuang, 1981, 1981

Synonyms
- Racoma ninglangensis (Wang, Zhang & Zhuang, 1981)

Species of fish

Schizothorax ninglangensis is a species of ray-finned fish in the genus Schizothorax, from Lugu Lake, Ninglang, Yunnan.
