= Schizothorax sinensis =

Conservation status
- Vulnerable (IUCN 3.1)

Scientific classification
- Kingdom: Animalia
- Phylum: Chordata
- Class: Actinopterygii
- Order: Cypriniformes
- Family: Cyprinidae
- Genus: Schizothorax
- Species: S. sinensis

Binomial name
- Schizothorax sinensis Herzenstein, 1889

Synonyms
- Racoma sinensis (Herzenstein, 1889)

Species of fish

Schizothorax sinensis is a species of ray-finned fish in the genus Schizothorax from the middle and upper parts of the Yangtze basin in China.
