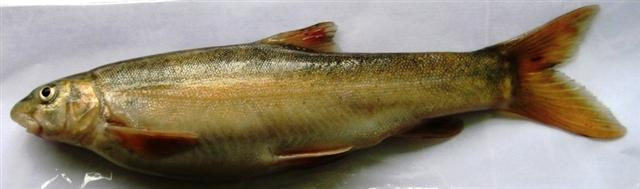

Conservation status
- Vulnerable (IUCN 3.1)

Scientific classification
- Kingdom: Animalia
- Phylum: Chordata
- Class: Actinopterygii
- Division: Teleostei
- Order: Cypriniformes
- Family: Cyprinidae
- Subfamily: Schizothoracinae
- Genus: Schizothorax
- Species: S. richardsonii

Binomial name
- Schizothorax richardsonii (J. E. Gray, 1832)

Synonyms
- Cyprinus richardsonii Gray, 1832; Oreinus richardsonii (Gray, 1832); Barbus maculatus McClelland, 1838; Oreinus maculatus (McClelland, 1838); Barbus guttatus McClelland, 1838; Oreinus guttatus (McClelland, 1838); Gonorhynchus petrophilus McClelland, 1839; Diptychus annandalei Regan, 1907

= Common snowtrout =

Species of fish

The common snowtrout or snowtrout (Schizothorax richardsonii), also known as "Asala", or "Asela" by the locals, is a species belong to the class of ray-finned fishes, family Cyprinidae, order Cypriniformes in the genus Schizothorax. The genus name Schizothorax is derived from Greek word, "schizein" meaning to divide, and "thorax" which means breast.

Common snowtrout is commonly found in the Himalayan region of India, Bhutan, Nepal, Pakistan, and Afghanistan. This species is adapted to fast-flowing, cold-water streams of Himalayan rivers. This species can be found in mountain rivers dwelling among rocks, feeding on algae, aquatic plants and detritus. They usually breed in April and May.

Common snowtrout has great commercial and cultural values to the local communities. They are much sought after as a consumption fish. However, their population is threatened by a number of factors including overfishing, pollution, the damming of rivers and the introduction of exotic fish, particularly salmonids and the population is declining.

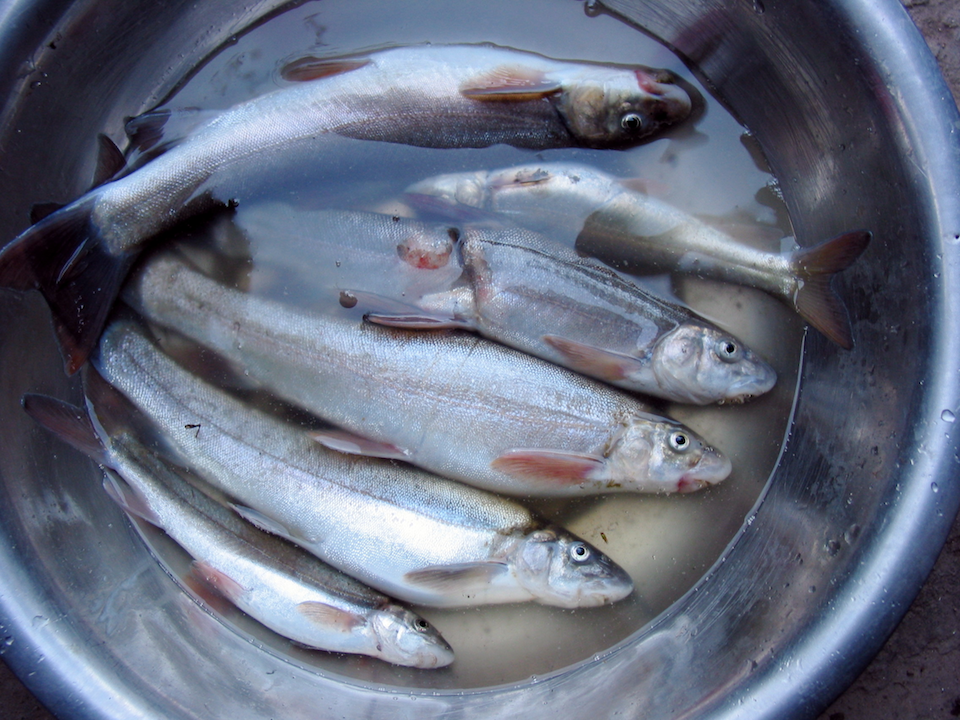
Common snow trout from Mahakali River along India-Nepal border

== Description ==
=== Morphological characteristics ===
Common snowtrout have streamlined body with smooth and soft skin covered in small scales to assist cutaneous respiration. They have short blunt head with broad and flat interorbital space. The upper jaw is longer than the lower part (inferior mouth) with a strip of hard papillated structure at chin called the adhesive organ; two pairs of barbels which are smaller than eye diameter. The keratinized lips help this species scraping off algae from the substrate as well as providing sturdy grip on the rocks in fast-flowing waters of Himalaya. The pharyngeal teeth are arranged in three rows with the counts of 4,3,2/2,3,4; and the hyobranchial skeleton have the same number of teeth. The dorsal fin originates near the snout tip. The dorsal spine is bony, strong and serrated at the hind part; originate at the anterior part of pelvic fins. The pectoral fins are shorter than head; and pelvic fins do not reach vent. There is tiled row of scales forming a sheath on either side of vent and anal fin, with lateral line complete and is arched.

=== The adhesive organ ===
Common snowtrout possess a unique adhesive organ by which they cling themselves on the rocky substrate of their habitat. This adhesive organ can be found on the ventral part of the head, just beneath the lower lip. This adhesive organ is made up from keratinized epidermis cells which possess larger number keratinocytes compared to epidermis elsewhere over their body. The outer epidermal cells are packed with bundles of tonofilaments and mucous granules which support adhesion. A callus part in their adhesive organ also likely plays role in adhesion. The callus epidermis forms cavities surrounded by tuberculated borders. The adhesion is the result of frictions between tubercles and surface of the substrates. The keratinization of the outer row cells of adhesive organs might protect the adhesive organ against mechanical damage.

== Range, distribution and habitat preference ==
Common snowtrout is the most common Schizothoracinae in the Himalayas. They can be found in almost all riverine systems of the Himalayas. They are distributed in India, Nepal, Bhutan, Pakistan, and Afghanistan. Water temperature is known to be the determining factor of geographical distribution and dispersal of common snowtrout. This species have the upper tolerance around 20 °C (68 °F) and are able to remain active in the near zero temperature in the streams of Lesser and Greater Himalayas during December and January.

== Biology ==
Himalayan fish including common snowtrout spend most part of their lives swimming against the current. This behavior helps to maintain their upright position and to make respiration easier. The common snowtrout prefers to live in Himalayan streams and rivers especially rivers with moderate flow speed. They thrive in fast-flowing water by clutching onto the rocks and stones at the bottom of the streams. This species has the proper adaptation for the fast-flowing water such as the streamlined body which helps them move easily against the torrential flow of the streams. This streamlined body offer the least resistance to the fast current and enabling movement against the current more efficiently. The small scales reduce friction and the absence or reduction of lipidosis on the ventral part of their bodies enable to press themselves against the substrate. This species is herbivorous, feeding on algae and detritus from the rocky substrate. The paired fins (pectoral and pelvic) are large with thick and muscular bases. Pectoral and pelvic fins are close to each other to resist the current. The paired fins are horizontally positioned and are shifted to the sides so the ventral side can be attached to the rocks and act as adhesive organ. Schizothorax richardsonii have two pairs of barbels which are smaller and shorter relative to the eye diameter. The common snowtrout is reported to have territoriality behavior and has been observed to chase intruders to defend the limited food resource and available shelter. Such behavior develops after the young fish emerge from the eggs laid in gravel.

== Reproduction ==
The breeding season for snowtrout has been recorded to occur between June and October with the peak in September. There have been observations indicating that Schizothoracines including S. richardsonii exhibit multiple spawning throughout the year following the temperature rise and flow rates which support egg laying. The female eggs are maturing (not fully mature) around February–May and ready to spawn around August–September, while the male sperms mature in March–April and ready to spawn in July–October. However, the fish spawn during spring despite the relatively immature gonads. The reason is the gonads fully mature in winter, but they are in dormant phase due to the low temperature, thus the fish spawn only on the returning favorable conditions in spring. The rise of temperature in streams from near freezing to 10–17 °C (50–63 °F) during May – June induces common snowtrout to spawn. In Sutlej River, common snowtrout start the migration upstream along with the rise in water temperature in March. During the migration, the fish endure low water temperature of 8.0–9.5 °C (46.4–49.1 °F) due to the steady influx of snow-melt water. This low temperature induces the fish to migrate to side streams where the ground water temperature is around 17.5–21.5 °C (63.5–70.7 °F) to spawn. In other river, Ravi River, this species spawn in May. In the upper Beas, this species spawn only in July – August when the water temperature warms up to 16.5–18.5 °C (61.7–65.3 °F). in the same drainage, common snowtrout migrate downstream to the lowermost reaches to spawn in October – December when the temperature is around 19–22.5 °C (66.2–72.5 °F). Their eggs are large (3.0-4.0 mm diameter) and sticky. This species lay eggs in shallow pools of 50 –70 cm depth and remain adhered to the bottom until the fry hatch.

== Fishery ==
Common snowtrout is valued culturally and economically in Central and northwestern Himalayas. This indigenous fish constitutes up to 64% of total catch in upland riverine systems in Kumaun and Garhwal Himalaya, making this species important food fish for the surrounding communities. This species also has big contribution to fisheries in the Lesser and Greater Himalaya is usually fished during winter in the lower reaches of Himalayan rivers.

== Threats and conservation status ==
Threats to common snowtrout include habitat fragmentation, slow growth, poor disease resistance and low survival rates. It is believed that alien species introduction, such as the introduction of brown trout (Salmo trutta), is the threat to the persistence of this species. In response to climate change, it is predicted that there will be a range shift upward towards the higher elevation.
