= Schizothorax skarduensis =

Conservation status
- Vulnerable (IUCN 3.1)

Scientific classification
- Kingdom: Animalia
- Phylum: Chordata
- Class: Actinopterygii
- Order: Cypriniformes
- Family: Cyprinidae
- Genus: Schizothorax
- Species: S. skarduensis

Binomial name
- Schizothorax skarduensis Mirza & A. A. Awan, 1978

Species of fish

Schizothorax skarduensis is a species of ray-finned fish in the genus Schizothorax which is endemic to Pakistan.
