= Schizothorax wangchiachii =

Conservation status
- Near Threatened (IUCN 3.1)

Scientific classification
- Kingdom: Animalia
- Phylum: Chordata
- Class: Actinopterygii
- Order: Cypriniformes
- Family: Cyprinidae
- Genus: Schizothorax
- Species: S. wangchiachii

Binomial name
- Schizothorax wangchiachii (P. W. Fang, 1936)

Synonyms
- Oreinus wangchiachii Fang, 1936; Racoma scleracanthus (Wu & Chen, 1979); Schizothorax scleracanthus Wu & Chen, 1979

Species of fish

Schizothorax wangchiachii is a species of ray-finned fish in the genus Schizothorax from the upper parts of the Yangtze basin in China.
