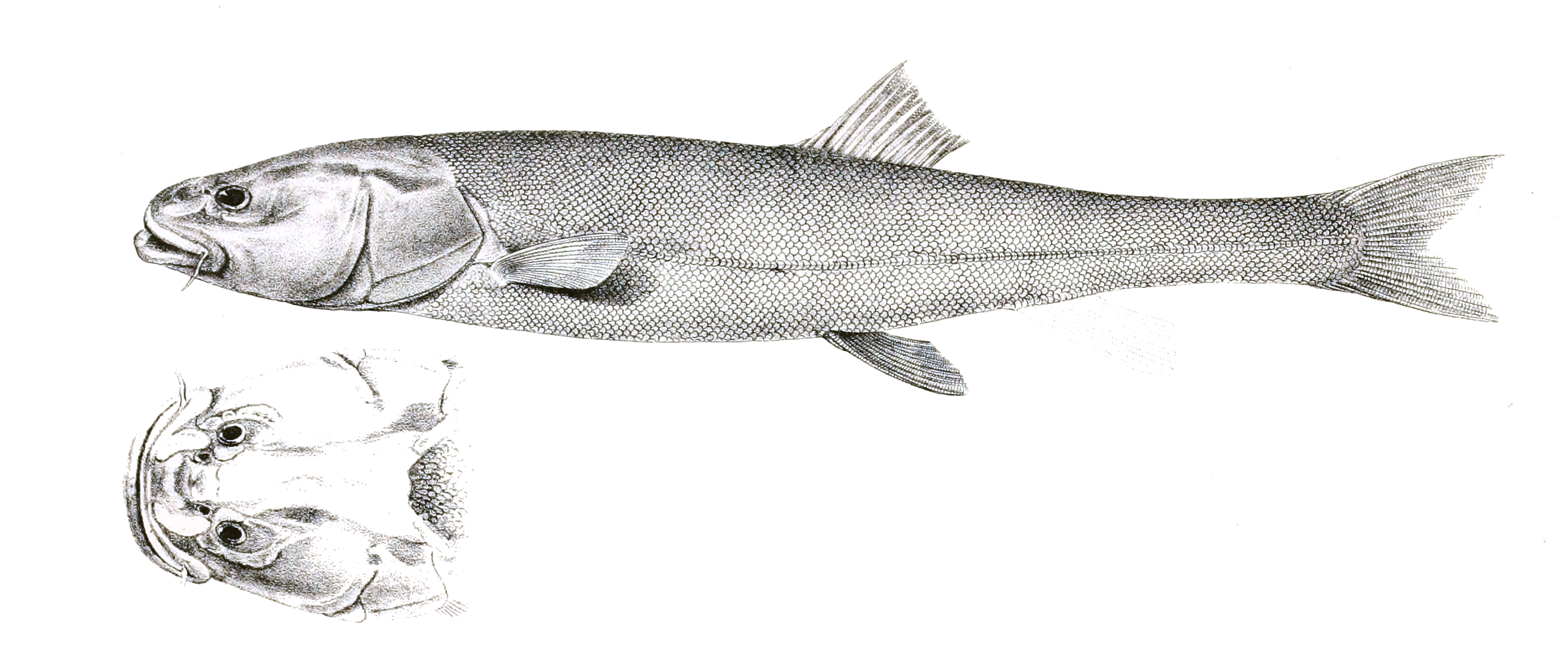
- A. laticeps depicted in "The Fishes of India" (1878)

Conservation status
- Critically Endangered (IUCN 3.1)

Scientific classification
- Kingdom: Animalia
- Phylum: Chordata
- Class: Actinopterygii
- Order: Cypriniformes
- Family: Cyprinidae
- Subfamily: Schizothoracinae
- Genus: Aspiorhynchus; Kessler, 1879
- Species: A. laticeps

Binomial name
- Aspiorhynchus laticeps (Day, 1877)

Synonyms
- Ptychobarbus laticeps Day, 1877; Ptychobarbus longiceps Day, 1877; Aspiorhynchus przewalskii Kessler, 1879; Aspiorhynchus sartus Zugmayer, 1909

= Big-head schizothoracin =

Species of fish

The big-head schizothoracin (Aspiorhynchus laticeps) is a species of freshwater ray-finned fish belonging to the family Cyprinidae, the family which includes the carps, barbs and related fishes. It is the only member of the genus Aspiorhynchus, which is classified within the subfamily Schizothoracinae, the snow barbels. This species is endemic to Xinjiang, where it was found only in stagnant lakes and slow flowing rivers in the basin of the Tarim He. The only known extant population is in the Kezier Reservoir, a population maintained by the introduction of captive bred fish. The big-head schizothoracin is a predatory species which feeds on other cyprinids and Triplophysa loaches. It migrates into smaller, boulder strewn alluvial fan streams to spawn.

== See also ==
- List of endangered and protected species of China
