= Schizothorax niger =

Scientific classification
- Kingdom: Animalia
- Phylum: Chordata
- Class: Actinopterygii
- Division: Teleostei
- Order: Cypriniformes
- Family: Cyprinidae
- Subfamily: Schizothoracinae
- Genus: Schizopyge
- Species: S. niger

Binomial name
- Schizopyge niger Heckel, 1838

Synonyms
- Schizothorax niger (Heckel, 1838); Schizothorax planifrons Heckel, 1838; Schizothorax planifrons (Heckel, 1838)

Species of fish

Schizopyge niger, the Alghad snowtrout, is a species of cyprinid freshwater fish that lives in cold lakes and nearby channels in the Kashmir region in India and Pakistan. It reaches up to about 33 cm (13 in) in standard length.
