= Schizothorax grahami =

Conservation status
- Critically Endangered (IUCN 3.1)

Scientific classification
- Kingdom: Animalia
- Phylum: Chordata
- Class: Actinopterygii
- Order: Cypriniformes
- Family: Cyprinidae
- Genus: Schizothorax
- Species: S. grahami

Binomial name
- Schizothorax grahami (Regan, 1904)

Synonyms
- Oreinus grahami Regan, 1904; Racoma grahami (Regan, 1904)

Species of fish

Schizothorax grahami, the Kunming snowtrout, is a species of ray-finned fish in the genus Schizothorax. It is endemic to Lake Dianchi, its tributaries and connected springs, in Yunnan Province, China. The species has not been caught in the lake in the past 20 years, but it is present in one tributary drainage basin. The introduction of exotic fish is the main threat to this species.
