= Schizothorax macropogon =

Conservation status
- Near Threatened (IUCN 3.1)

Scientific classification
- Kingdom: Animalia
- Phylum: Chordata
- Class: Actinopterygii
- Order: Cypriniformes
- Family: Cyprinidae
- Subfamily: Schizothoracinae
- Genus: Schizothorax
- Species: S. macropogon

Binomial name
- Schizothorax macropogon Regan, 1905

Synonyms
- Racoma macropogon (Regan, 1905)

Species of fish

Schizothorax macropogon is a species of ray-finned fish in the genus Schizothorax which is known only from the upper Brahmaputra River in Tibet.
