= Schizothorax malacathus =

Conservation status
- Data Deficient (IUCN 3.1)

Scientific classification
- Kingdom: Animalia
- Phylum: Chordata
- Class: Actinopterygii
- Order: Cypriniformes
- Family: Cyprinidae
- Genus: Schizothorax
- Species: S. malacathus

Binomial name
- Schizothorax malacathus S. Y. Huang, 1985

Species of fish

Schizothorax malacathus is a species of ray-finned fish in the genus Schizothorax from the upper Irrawaddy River drainage in Yunnan. It is found in hill streams with rocky stream beds, it grazes on periphyton.
