= Garra ethelwynnae =

Scientific classification
- Kingdom: Animalia
- Phylum: Chordata
- Class: Actinopterygii
- Order: Cypriniformes
- Family: Cyprinidae
- Subfamily: Labeoninae
- Genus: Garra
- Species: G. ethelwynnae

Binomial name
- Garra ethelwynnae Menon, 1958

Species of fish

Garra ethelwynnae is a species of ray-finned fish in the genus Garra which is known only from Eritrea.

== Etymology ==
The specific name of this fish honours the British ichthyologist Ethelwynn Trewavas (1900-1993).
