= Kal Shur =

Kal Shur كل شور
- Village
- Location within Iran
- Coordinates: 30°55′51″N 50°20′54″E
- Country: Iran
- Province: Kohgiluyeh and Boyer-Ahmad
- County: Landeh
- Bakhsh: Central
- Rural District: Olya Tayeb

Population (2006)
  - Total: 48
- Time zone: UTC+3:30 (IRST)
  - Summer (DST): UTC+4:30 (IRDT)

Kal Shur (Persian: كل شور, also Romanized as Kal Shūr; also known as Kal Sūr) is a village in Olya Tayeb Rural District, in the Central District of Landeh County, Kohgiluyeh and Boyer-Ahmad Province, Iran. At the 2006 census, its population was 48, in 6 families.
