= A. G. K. Menon =

- Born: Ambat Gopalan Kutty Menon; April 19, 1921
- Died: April 11, 2002 (aged 80)
- Known for: Taxonomy and biogeography of Indian fishes
- Scientific career
- Fields: Ichthyology
- Workplaces: University of Madras; Zoological Survey of India; University of Dar es Salaam
- Doctoral advisor: Sunder Lal Hora

Ambat Gopalan Kutty Menon, (19 April 1921 – 11 April 2002), was an Indian ichthyologist and university professor.

== Biography ==
A. G. K. Menon grew up in Coonoor, in the Indian state of Tamil Nadu, where his father worked as a physician at the Pasteur Institute. He attended a British high school in Chittoor, Andhra Pradesh. He subsequently studied zoology at Madura College in Madurai, Tamil Nadu, one of the oldest institutions of higher education in British India. He then undertook postgraduate studies at Presidency College of the University of Madras in Chennai, completing his PhD in 1952 under the supervision of Sunder Lal Hora. A few years later he obtained the DSc degree. In 1953, Menon married a granddaughter of the last Maharaja of the princely state of Cochin.

Under the guidance of Sunder Lal Hora, Menon became deeply involved during his studies and in the following years with the Satpura hypothesis developed by Hora. According to the hypothesis, the Satpura Range of central India served as a bridge through which fauna of the Malay Peninsula dispersed onto the Indian subcontinent and into the Western Ghats. As evidence for the hypothesis, Hora and Menon cited similarities such as the development of organs for attachment to rocks in fast-flowing waters, which are now recognized as examples of convergent evolution.

In his later research, Menon worked on a range of higher taxa of fishes, rather than specializing exclusively in marine or freshwater fishes as many of his contemporaries did. During a research career spanning more than fifty years, Menon published more than 100 scientific publications, many of them monographs. In addition to revising a number of taxa, he described 43 species of fish as new to science. After working for decades as a university teacher at the University of Madras and as a scientist at the Southern Regional Centre of the Zoological Survey of India (ZSI) in Chennai, he retired as deputy head of the station in 1978.

After his retirement, Menon became an associate professor at the Institute for Marine Science of the University of Dar es Salaam. After three years, he returned to Madras to continue his research at the ZSI as an emeritus scientist. During these later years, he published the two volumes of the Fauna of India dealing with the then-recognized family Homalopteridae (largely corresponding to the hillstream loaches) and the Cobitidae. His collaboration with the International Union for Conservation of Nature (IUCN), whose Fish Specialist Group he belonged to, resulted in the publication in 1999 of a checklist of Indian freshwater fishes. A monograph on the threatened fishes of India was published after Menon's death. He was unable to complete an extensive revision of the carp genus Puntius. Menon was the founding president of the Indian Society of Ichthyologists. Several species of fish have been named in his honor.

== Eponyms ==
The following fish species have been named in honor of Menon:

- Garra menoni Rema Devi & Indra, 1984
- Ghatsa menoni (Shaji & Easa, 1995)
- Mystus menoni Plamoottil & Abraham, 2013
- Nemacheilus menoni Zacharias & Minimol, 1999

Garra menoni was named for Menon by Rema Devi and Indra in 1984, and Mystus menoni was named in his honor by Plamoottil and Abraham in 2013.

== Taxa described ==
The following are selected species described by Menon, alone or with co-authors:

- Garra ethelwynnae Menon, 1958
- Gonorhynchus periyarensis (Menon & Jacob, 1996)
- Sahyadria chalakkudiensis (Menon, Rema Devi & Thobias, 1999)
- Schizothorax kumaonensis Menon, 1971

== Selected publications ==
- Menon, A. G. K. (1951). "Distribution of Clariid Fishes, and Its Significance in Zoogeographical Studies". Proceedings of the Indian National Science Academy. 17(4): 291–299.
- Menon, A. G. K. (1964). Monograph of the cyprinid fishes of the genus Garra Hamilton. Memoirs of the Indian Museum, 14(4): 173–260.
- Menon, A. G. K. (1974). A Check-list of Fishes of the Himalayan and the Indo-Gangetic Plains. Barrackpore: Inland Fisheries Society of India, Central Inland Fisheries Research Institute.
- Menon, A. G. K. (1977). A Systematic Monograph of the Tongue Soles of the Genus Cynoglossus Hamilton-Buchanan (Pisces, Cynoglossidae). Smithsonian Contributions to Zoology, no. 238. Washington, D.C.: Smithsonian Institution Press.
- Menon, A. G. K. (1987). Fauna of India. Pisces. Vol. IV. Teleostei – Cobitoidea. Part 1. Homalopteridae. Calcutta: Zoological Survey of India.
- Menon, A. G. K. (1992). Fauna of India. Pisces. Vol. IV. Teleostei – Cobitoidea. Part 2. Cobitidae. Calcutta: Zoological Survey of India.
- Menon, A. G. K. (1999). Check List – Fresh Water Fishes of India. Calcutta: Zoological Survey of India. ISBN 81-85874-15-8.
- Menon, A. G. K. (2004). Threatened Fishes of India and Their Conservation. Kolkata: Zoological Survey of India. ISBN 8-18171-023-1.
