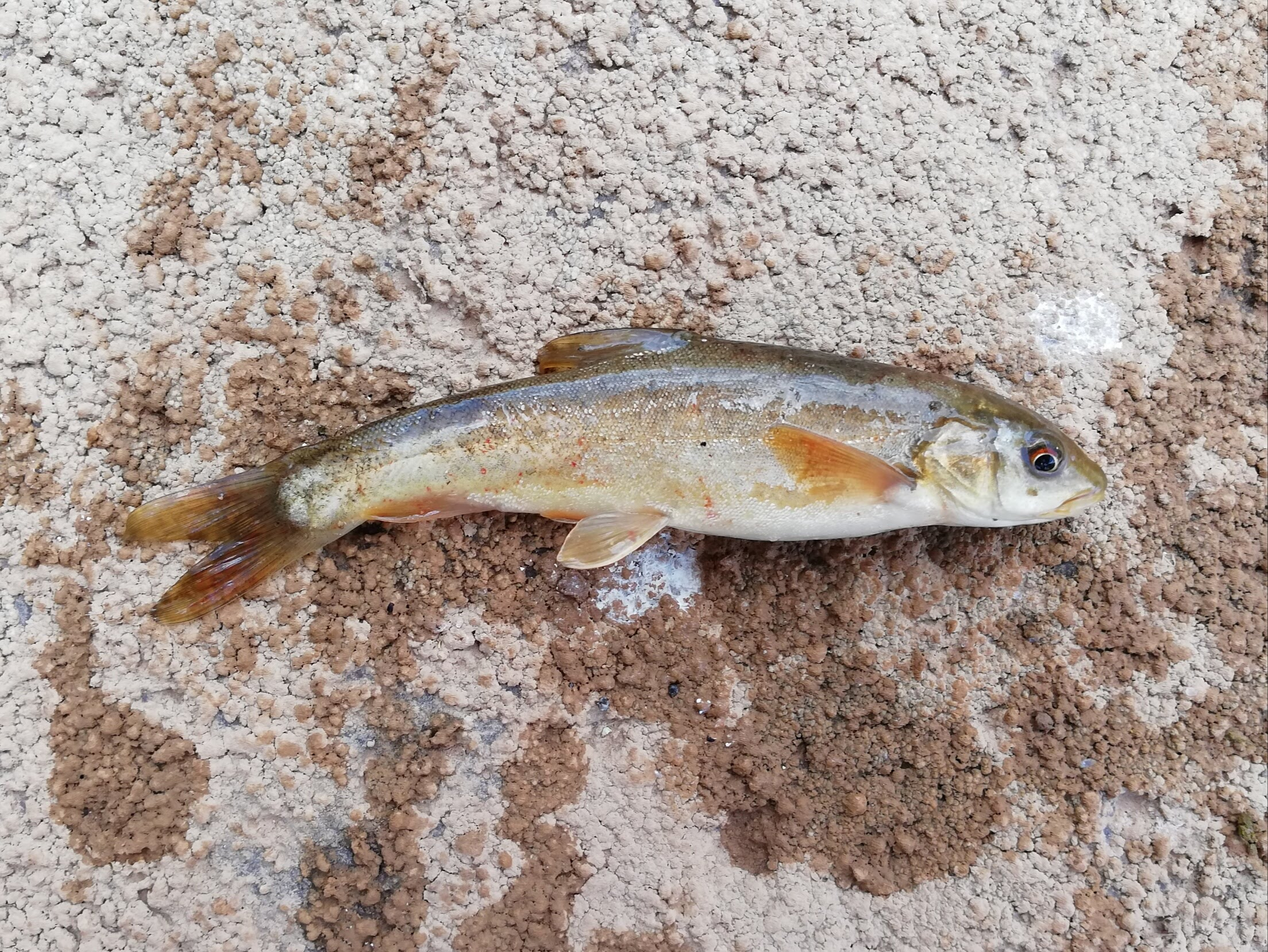

Conservation status
- Least Concern (IUCN 3.1)

Scientific classification
- Kingdom: Animalia
- Phylum: Chordata
- Class: Actinopterygii
- Division: Teleostei
- Order: Cypriniformes
- Family: Cyprinidae
- Subfamily: Schizothoracinae
- Genus: Schizopyge; Heckel, 1847
- Species: S. curvifrons

Binomial name
- Schizopyge curvifrons (Heckel, 1838)

Synonyms
- Schizothorax curvifrons Heckel, 1838; Schizothoraichthys curvifrons (Heckel, 1838); Schizothorax longipinnis Heckel, 1838; Schizopyge longipinnis (Heckel, 1838); Schizothoraichthys longipinnis (Heckel, 1838); Schizothorax micropogon Heckel, 1838; Schizopyge micropogon (Heckel, 1838); Schizothoraichthys micropogon (Heckel, 1838); Oerinus plagiostomus McClelland, 1842; Racoma brevis McClelland, 1842; Schizothorax minutus Kessler, 1872; Schizothorax affinis Kessler, 1872; Schizothorax aksaiensis Kessler, 1872; Schizothorax irregularis Day, 1877; Schizothorax intermedius eurycephalus L. S. Berg, 1932; Schizothorax schumacheri Fowler & Steinitz, 1956

= Sattar snowtrout =

Species of fish

Sattar snowtrout (Schizopyge curvifrons) is a species of freshwater ray-finned fish belonging to the family Cyprinidae, the family which includes the carps, barbs and related fishes. It is the only species in the genus Schizopyge. This genus is classified within the subfamily Schizothoracinae, the snow barbels. This species is found to the highlands of south-central Asia from Iran to China where it can be found in most types of freshwater habitats. This species can reach a length of 56 centimetres (22 in) TL and a weight of up to 1.3 kilograms (2.9 lb). It is important to local commercial fisheries.
