= Karl Kessler =

Baltic German zoologist (1815–1881)

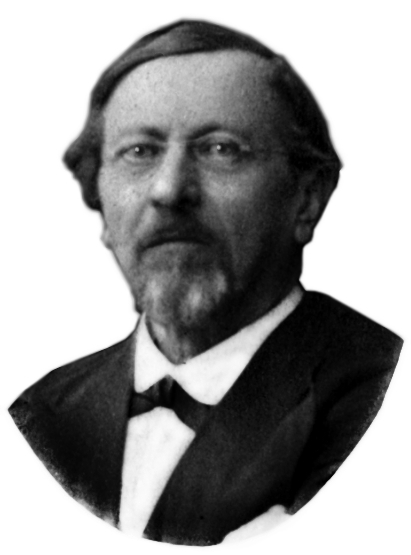
Kessler in 1868

Karl Fedorovich Kessler (Russian: Карл Фёдорович Ке́сслер, romanized: Karl Fyodorovich Kessler; 1 December [O.S. 19 November] 1815 – 15 March [O.S. 3 March] 1881) was a Baltic German zoologist and professor of biology at Saint Petersburg Imperial University. He is best known for advancing the idea that evolution at the infraspecific level is strongly influenced by mutual aid, arguing that Charles Darwin placed excessive emphasis on competition, which Kessler accepted primarily as operating at the interspecific level.

== Life and work ==
Kessler was born in Damrau, Konigsberg, where his father was a royal forester (oberforestmeister). His father moved to Novgorod Governorate, where Kessler grew up. In 1828, he joined the Third Saint Petersburg Gymnasium with a scholarship and went to Saint Petersburg Imperial University in 1834. He attended the zoology lectures of Stepan Kutorga. After graduation he worked as a school mathematics teacher.

In 1837, Kessler and his botanist friend from student days, Nikolai Zheleznov went on an expedition to Finland. In 1840, he defended a master's dissertation on the legs of birds in relation to systematics. In 1842, his doctoral dissertation was on the skeleton of woodpeckers in relation to their classification. He then obtained a zoology chair at the University of Kiev, a position vacated by Alexander von Middendorff, who went to Siberia on an expedition.

Kessler collected and examined numerous taxa across the region. He conducted most of his studies of birds in Ukrainian regions of the Russian Empire: Kiev Governorate, Volhynia Governorate, Kherson Governorate, Poltava Governorate and Bessarabia. He also studied the fish of the Dniester, Dnieper, and Southern Bug rivers, and on the Ukrainian coast of the Black Sea. Based on the fish fauna, he hypothesized that several of the lakes in the region were earlier connected. He suggested that the Black and Caspian Seas had separated early and that the Black Sea and the Mediterranean had been connected by streams. Thus he was among the early zoogeographers.

In 1862, he replaced Stepan Kutorga at Saint Petersburg Imperial University. Here he established a zoology department. A year after the first congress of Russian naturalists and doctors, he founded the Saint Petersburg Society of Naturalists in 1868, and in an address to the society in 1879 he proposed that mutual aid, rather than mutual struggle, was the main factor in the evolution of a species. The anarchist Peter Kropotkin later developed this theory in his book Mutual Aid: A Factor of Evolution.

== Eponymy ==
Numerous species have been named after Kessler including Kessler's gudgeon (Romanogobio kesslerii), Ponticola kessleri, Barbus kessleri, and Turdus kessleri.

== See also ==
- Category:Taxa named by Karl Kessler
- Antoine Laurent Apollinaire Fée
- Jean-Charles Houzeau
- Alphonse Toussenel
