= John McClelland (doctor) =

British naturalist (1805–1883)

John McClelland or M'Clelland (1805 – 31 July 1883) was a British medical doctor with interests in natural history, who worked for the East India Company in India and Burma. He served as a temporary curator of the museum of the Asiatic Society of Bengal just before a permanent curator was found in Edward Blyth.

McClelland is thought to have been born in Ireland, studied medicine and was admitted member of the Royal College of Surgeons in 1828. He entered the service of the East India Company in the Bengal Medical Service on 7th April 1830. In 1835 he was sent on a mission (Tea Committee) to identify if tea could be grown in north-eastern India along with Nathaniel Wallich and William Griffith. This mission ran into troubles with the members of the group clashing with each other.

McClelland was appointed 1836 as the secretary of the "Coal Committee", the forerunner of the Geological Survey of India (GSI), formed to explore possibilities to exploit Indian coal. He was the first to propose hiring professional geologists for the task. He was also involved in surveys of forests and his reports led to the establishment of the Forest Department in India. In 1838 he was a temporary curator of the museum of the Asiatic Society of Bengal. In 1839 he was offered the permanent post of curator of the museum of the Asiatic Society of Bengal but he rejected the offer because he did not accept the terms of two hours daily attendance at the museum and to produce monthly reports of progress. At the time he was deputy apothecary, assistant opium examiner as well as secretary to the coal and iron committee with the first position requiring his presence in office from eleven to four daily. The curator position was then filled by Edward Blyth. McClelland quit the Asiatic Society of Bengal and founded and edited the Calcutta Journal of Natural History, and Miscellany of the Arts and Sciences in India which ran from 1841 to 1847. McClelland was influenced by the quinarian system.

McClelland also served as an interim superintendent of the Calcutta Botanical Garden from 1846 to 1847. He was superintendent of forests in lower Burma from 1852 to 1856. In 1860 he became junior inspector general and in 1862, following the retirement of John Forsyth, he was made Inspector General and he retired on 24th November 1865. He died at Hastings and was buried at St. Leonards-on-Sea. The grave stone also records the death of his wife Sophie, "wife of Henry Swaine and Widow of the above, John McClelland, Who died April 5, 1885, Aged 44 years."

== Work and legacy ==
McClelland's major botanical contribution was his editing of the work of William Griffith which was published posthumously as Notulae ad plantas asiaticas. In his original work as an ichthyologist he described many species and several genera of fish, among them Schistura. The Spotted codlet fish Bregmaceros mcclellandi W. Thompson, 1840 is named after him. McClelland is commemorated in the name of the mountain bulbul, Ixos mcclellandii and a species of snake, Sinomicrurus macclellandi.

== Writings ==
- McClelland J (1839). "Indian Cyprinidae". Asiatic Researches 19: 217–471.
