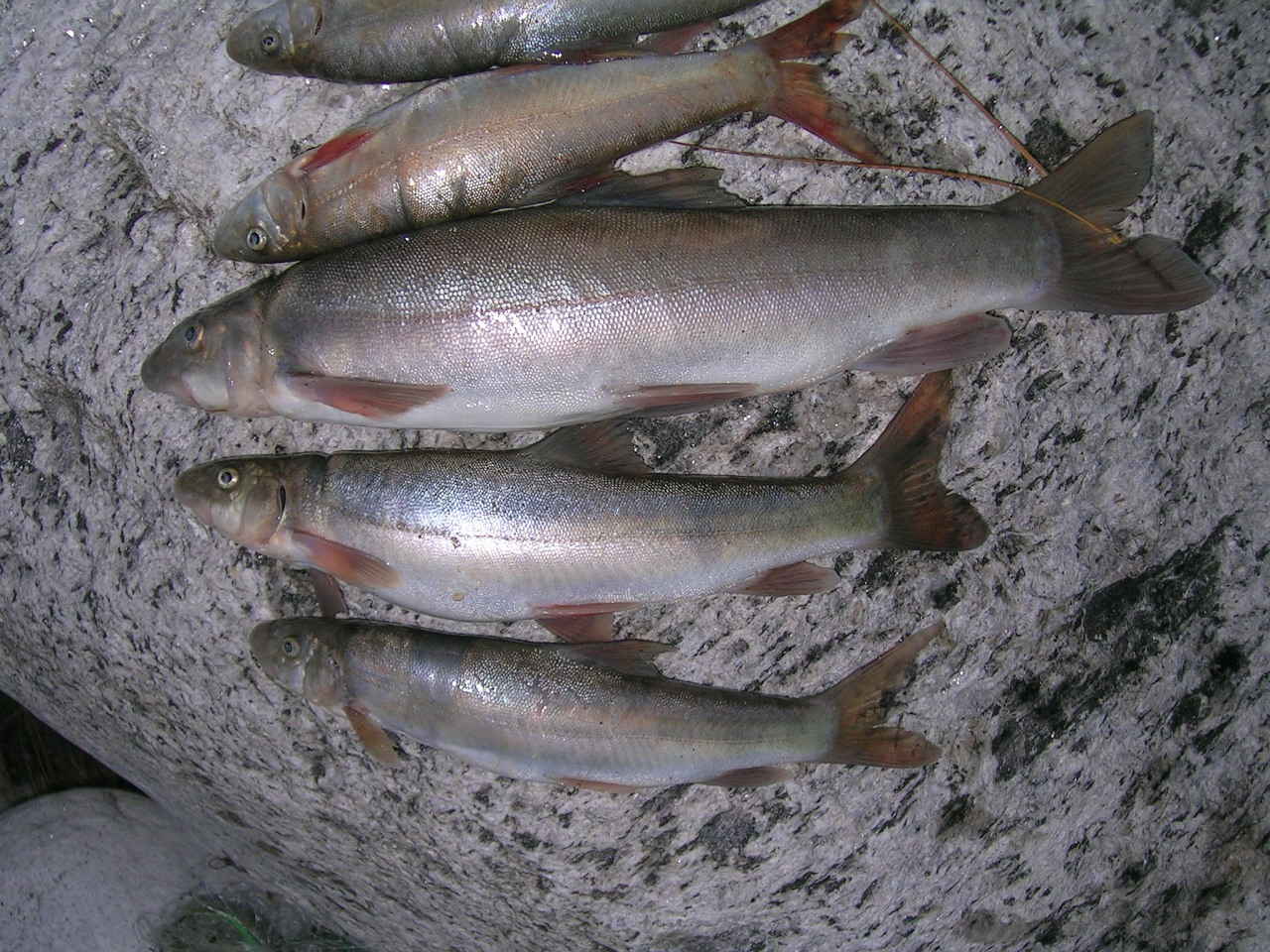
- Schizothorax species from the Ghori river, Pithoragarh, India. Locally called Asela

Scientific classification
- Kingdom: Animalia
- Phylum: Chordata
- Class: Actinopterygii
- Division: Teleostei
- Order: Cypriniformes
- Family: Cyprinidae
- Subfamily: Schizothoracinae; McClelland, 1842

= Schizothoracinae =

Schizothoracinae Temporal range: Oligocene–present

Subfamily of fishes

Schizothoracinae, the snow barbels, is a subfamily of freshwater ray-finned fishes belonging to the family Cyprinidae, which includes the carps, barbs, minnows and related fishes. The fishes in this subfamily are found in Asia.

== Genera ==
Schizothoracinae contains the following genera:

- Aspiorhynchus Kessler, 1879
- Percocypris Y. T. Chu, 1935
- Schizopyge Heckel, 1847
- Schizothorax Heckel, 1838

Three fossil genera are also known, all from the Tibetan Plateau:

- †Hsianwenia Chang et al, 2008 (Pliocene of China)
- †Paleoschizothorax Yang et al., 2018 (Oligocene of China)
- †Plesioschizothorax Wu & Chen, 1980 (Miocene of China)

Fossils of Paleoschizothorax suggest that early schizothoracines originally inhabited the large, swampy river basins, such as the Qaidam Basin, that existed on the Tibetan Plateau prior to significant uplift of the Himalayas. Following the uplift of the mountain range, many schizothoracines became adapted to fast-flowing high altitude rivers. Others, such as Schizothorax species found in southern China, continued to inhabit a low-lying subtropical environment.
