= Diptychus sewerzowi =

Conservation status
- Least Concern (IUCN 3.1)

Scientific classification
- Kingdom: Animalia
- Phylum: Chordata
- Class: Actinopterygii
- Order: Cypriniformes
- Family: Cyprinidae
- Subfamily: Schizopygopsinae
- Genus: Diptychus
- Species: D. sewerzowi

Binomial name
- Diptychus sewerzowi Kessler, 1872

Species of fish

Diptychus sewerzowi is a species of freshwater ray-finned fish belonging to the family Cyprinidae, the family which includes the carps, barbs and related fishes. This species is found in highlands of Central Asia, in Xinjiang; Kazakhstan; Kyrgyzstan and Uzbekistan. Here it occurs in mountain rivers with cold, fast running water over rocky, gravel or sandy riverbeds.
