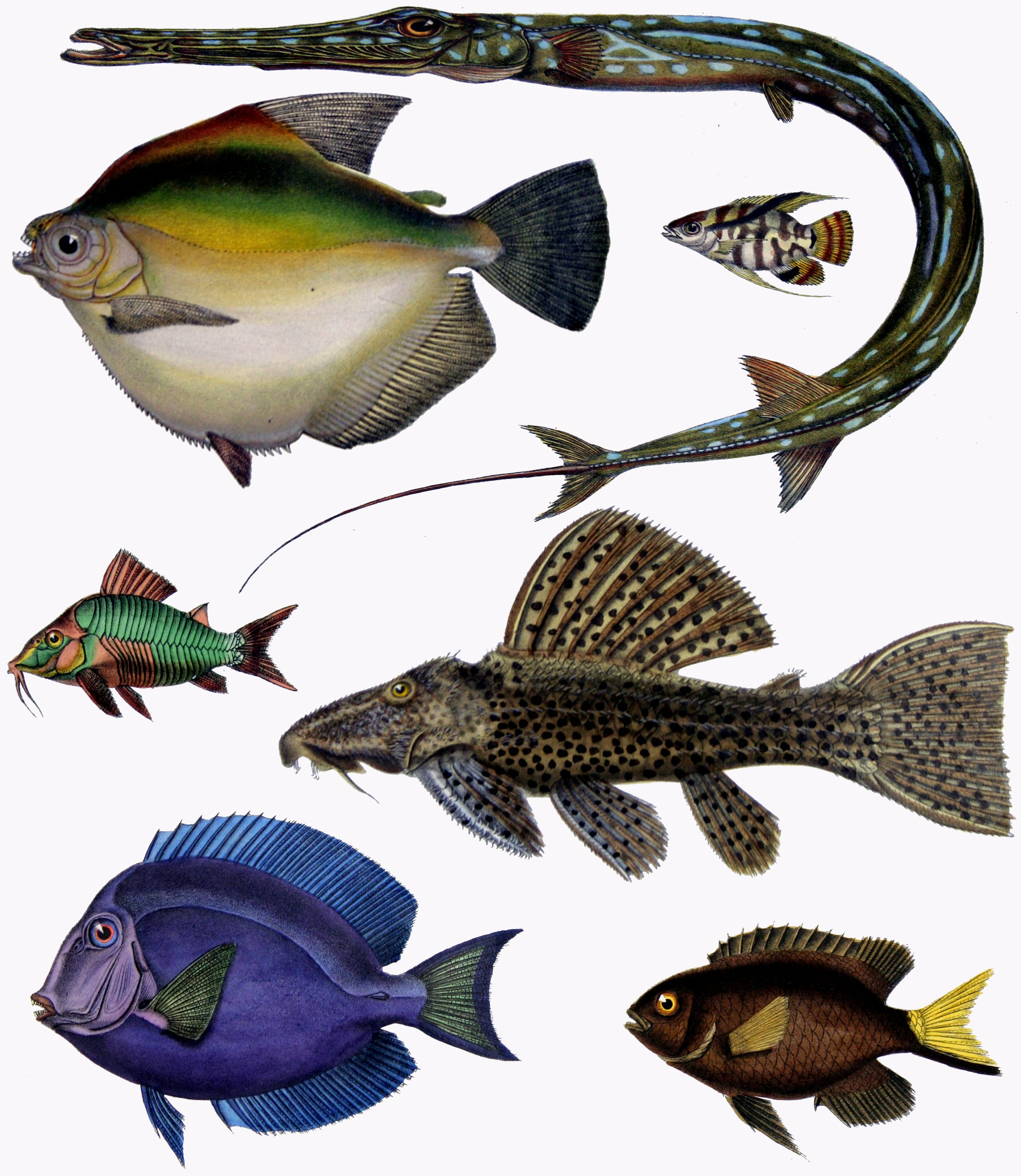
- Teleosts of different orders, painted by Castelnau, 1856 (left to right, top to bottom): Fistularia tabacaria (Syngnathiformes), Mylossoma duriventre (Characiformes), Mesonauta acora (Cichliformes), Corydoras splendens and Pseudacanthicus spinosus (Siluriformes), Acanthurus coeruleus (Acanthuriformes), Stegastes pictus (Blenniiformes)

Scientific classification
- Kingdom: Animalia
- Phylum: Chordata
- Class: Actinopterygii
- Infraclass: Teleosteomorpha
- Division: Teleostei; J. P. Müller, 1845

Subgroups
- See text

= Teleost =

Teleost Temporal range: Early Triassic – Recent

Division or infraclass of fishes

Teleostei (/ˌtɛliˈɒstiaɪ/; from Ancient Greek τέλειος (téleios) 'complete' and ὀστέον (ostéon) 'bone'), members of which are known as teleosts (/ˈtɛliɒsts, ˈtiːli-/), is, by far, the largest group of ray-finned fishes (class Actinopterygii), (Note: The other three groups are the Holostei (bowfins and gars), the Chondrostei (sturgeons and paddlefish), and the Cladistia (bichirs and reedfish).) with 96% of all extant species of fish. The Teleostei, which is variously considered a division or an infraclass in different taxonomic systems, include over 26,000 species that are arranged in about 40 orders and 448 families. Teleosts range from giant oarfish measuring 7.6 m (25 ft) or more, and ocean sunfish weighing over 2 t (2.0 long tons; 2.2 short tons), to the minute male anglerfish Photocorynus spiniceps, just 6.2 mm (0.24 in) long. Including not only torpedo-shaped fish built for speed, teleosts can be flattened vertically or horizontally, be elongated cylinders or take specialised shapes as in anglerfish and seahorses.

The difference between teleosts and other bony fish lies mainly in their jaw bones; teleosts have a movable premaxilla and corresponding modifications in the jaw musculature which make it possible for them to protrude their jaws outwards from the mouth. This is of great advantage, enabling them to grab prey and draw it into the mouth. In more derived teleosts, the enlarged premaxilla is the main tooth-bearing bone, and the maxilla, which is attached to the lower jaw, acts as a lever, pushing and pulling the premaxilla as the mouth is opened and closed. Other bones further back in the mouth serve to grind and swallow food. Another difference is that the upper and lower lobes of the tail (caudal) fin are about equal in size. The spine ends at the caudal peduncle, distinguishing this group from other fish in which the spine extends into the upper lobe of the tail fin.

Teleosts have adopted a range of reproductive strategies. Most use external fertilisation: the female lays a batch of eggs, the male fertilises them and the larvae develop without any further parental involvement. A fair proportion of teleosts are sequential hermaphrodites, starting life as females and transitioning to males at some stage, with a few species reversing this process. A small percentage of teleosts are viviparous and some provide parental care with typically the male fish guarding a nest and fanning the eggs to keep them well-oxygenated.

Teleosts are economically important to humans, as is shown by their depiction in art over the centuries. The fishing industry harvests them for food, and anglers attempt to capture them for sport. Some species are farmed commercially, and this method of production is likely to be increasingly important in the future. Others are kept in aquariums or used in research, especially in the fields of genetics and developmental biology.

== Anatomy ==
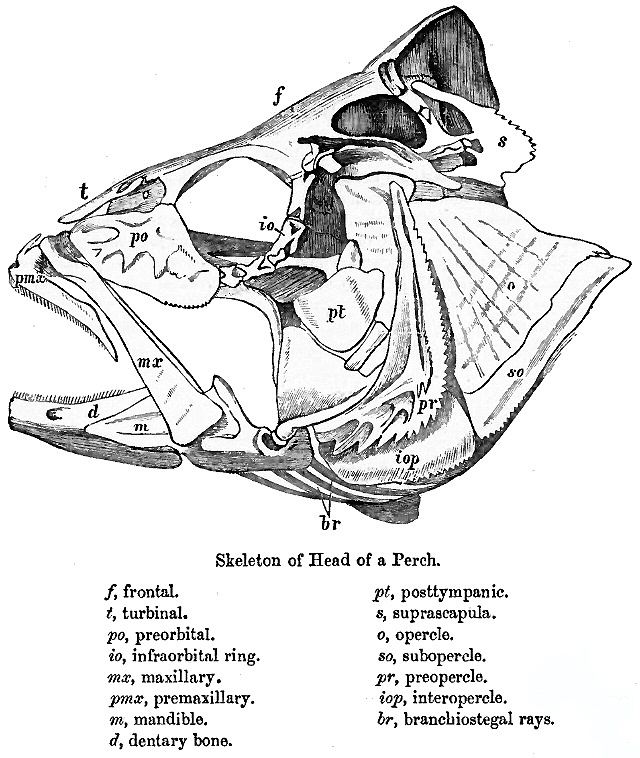
Teleost skull and jaw anatomy enables them both to suck in prey, and to close the mouth without expelling the prey again.

Distinguishing features of the teleosts are mobile premaxilla, elongated neural arches at the end of the caudal fin and unpaired basibranchial toothplates. The premaxilla is unattached to the neurocranium (braincase); it plays a role in protruding the mouth and creating a circular opening. This lowers the pressure inside the mouth, sucking the prey inside. The lower jaw and maxilla are then pulled back to close the mouth, and the fish is able to grasp the prey. By contrast, mere closure of the jaws would risk pushing food out of the mouth. In more advanced teleosts, the premaxilla is enlarged and has teeth, while the maxilla is toothless. The maxilla functions to push both the premaxilla and the lower jaw forward. To open the mouth, an adductor muscle pulls back the top of the maxilla, pushing the lower jaw forward. In addition, the maxilla rotates slightly, which pushes forward a bony process that interlocks with the premaxilla.

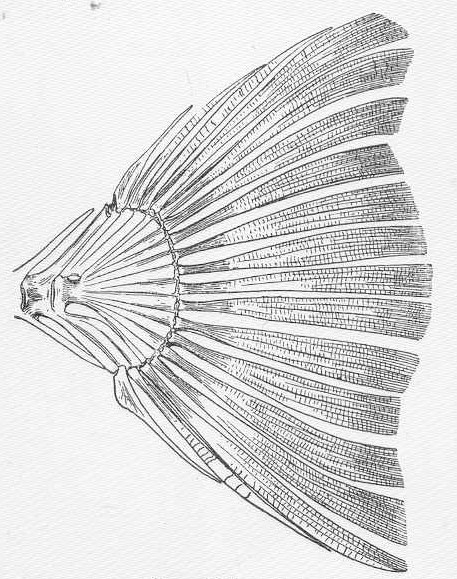
Caudal skeleton showing symmetrical (homocercal) tail

The pharyngeal jaws of teleosts, a second set of jaws contained within the throat, are composed of five branchial arches, loops of bone which support the gills. The first three arches include a single basibranchial surrounded by two hypobranchials, ceratobranchials, epibranchials and pharyngobranchials. The median basibranchial is covered by a toothplate. The fourth arch is composed of pairs of ceratobranchials and epibranchials, and sometimes additionally, some pharyngobranchials and a basibranchial. The base of the lower pharyngeal jaws is formed by the fifth ceratobranchials while the second, third and fourth pharyngobranchials create the base of the upper. In the more basal teleosts the pharyngeal jaws consist of well-separated thin parts that attach to the neurocranium, pectoral girdle, and hyoid bar. Their function is limited to merely transporting food, and they rely mostly on lower pharyngeal jaw activity. In more derived teleosts the jaws are more powerful, with left and right ceratobranchials fusing to become one lower jaw; the pharyngobranchials fuse to create a large upper jaw that articulates with the neurocranium. They have also developed a muscle that allows the pharyngeal jaws to have a role in grinding food in addition to transporting it.

The caudal fin is homocercal, meaning the upper and lower lobes are about equal in size. The spine ends at the caudal peduncle, the base of the caudal fin, distinguishing this group from those in which the spine extends into the upper lobe of the caudal fin, such as most fish from the Paleozoic (541 to 252 million years ago). The neural arches are elongated to form uroneurals which provide support for this upper lobe.

Teleosts tend to be quicker and more flexible than more basal bony fishes. Their skeletal structure has evolved towards greater lightness. While teleost bones are well calcified, they are constructed from a scaffolding of struts, rather than the dense cancellous bones of holostean fish. In addition, the lower jaw of the teleost is reduced to just three bones; the dentary, the angular bone and the articular bone. The genital and urinary tracts end behind the anus in the genital papilla; this is observed to sex teleosts.

== Evolution and phylogeny ==
=== External relationships ===
The teleosts were first recognised as a distinct group by the German ichthyologist Johannes Peter Müller in 1845. The name is from Greek teleios, "complete" + osteon, "bone". Müller based this classification on certain soft tissue characteristics, which would prove to be problematic, as it did not take into account the distinguishing features of fossil teleosts. In 1966, Greenwood et al. provided a more solid classification. The oldest fossils of teleosteomorphs (the stem group from which teleosts later evolved) date back to the Triassic period (Prohalecites, Pholidophorus). However, it has been suggested that teleosts probably first evolved already during the Paleozoic era. During the Mesozoic and Cenozoic eras they diversified widely, and as a result, 96% of all living fish species are teleosts.

The cladogram below shows the evolutionary relationships of the teleosts to other extant clades of bony fish, and to the four-limbed vertebrates (tetrapods) that evolved from a related group of bony fish during the Devonian period. Approximate divergence dates (in millions of years, mya) are from Near et al., 2012.

- Euteleostomi/ Osteichthyes
  - Sarcopterygii (lobe-fins)
    - Actinistia
      Coelacanths
    - Rhipidistia
      - Dipnoi
        Lungfish
      - Tetrapoda
        - Amphibia
          Lissamphibia
        - Amniota
          - Mammals
          - Sauropsida (reptiles, birds)
  - Actinopterygii (ray-fins) 400 mya
    - Cladistia
      Polypteriformes (bichirs, reedfishes)
    - Actinopteri
      - Chondrostei
        Acipenseriformes (sturgeons, paddlefishes)
      - Neopterygii 360 mya
        - Holostei 275 mya
          - Ginglymodi
            Lepisosteiformes (gars)
          - Halecomorphi
            Amiiformes (bowfin)
        - 310 mya
          Teleostei

=== Internal relationships ===
The phylogeny of the teleosts has been subject to long debate, without consensus on either their phylogeny or the timing of the emergence of the major groups before the application of modern DNA-based cladistic analysis. Near et al. (2012) explored the phylogeny and divergence times of every major lineage, analysing the DNA sequences of 9 unlinked genes in 232 species. They obtained well-resolved phylogenies with strong support for the nodes (so, the pattern of branching shown is likely to be correct). They calibrated (set actual values for) branching times in this tree from 36 reliable measurements of absolute time from the fossil record. The teleosts are divided into the major clades shown on the cladogram, with dates, following Near et al. More recent research divide the teleosts into two major groups: Eloposteoglossocephala (Elopomorpha + Osteoglossomorpha) and Clupeocephala (the rest of the teleosts).

- Teleostei 310 mya
  - Eloposteoglossocephala
    - - Osteoglossomorpha
        - Hiodontiformes (mooneyes)
        - 250 mya
          Osteoglossiformes (bonytongues, elephantfishes)
    - Elopomorpha
      - Elopiformes (tenpounders, tarpons)
      - - Albuliformes (Japanese gissus and bonefishes)
        - - Notacanthiformes (deep sea spiny eels)
          - Anguilliformes (true eels)
  - Clupeocephala
    - Otocephala 230 mya
      - Clupei
        Clupeiformes (herrings)
      - - Alepocephali
          Alepocephaliformes (slickheads)
        - Ostariophysi
          - Anotophysa
            Gonorynchiformes (milkfish)
          - Otophysa
            - Cypriniformes (minnows, carps, loaches)
            - - Characiformes (tetras, piranhas)
              - - Gymnotiformes (knifefish and electric eels)
                - Siluriformes (catfish)
    - Euteleostei 240 mya
      - - Lepidogalaxii
          Lepidogalaxiiformes (salamanderfish)
      - - - Protacanthopterygii 225 mya
            - Argentiniformes (marine smelts)
            - - Galaxiiformes (galaxias, mudfishes)
              - - Esociformes (pike)
                - Salmoniformes (salmon, trout)
        - - Stomiati
            - Stomiiformes (dragonfish)
            - Osmeriformes (smelt)
          - Neoteleostei 175 mya
            - Ateleopodia
              Ateleopodiformes (jellynoses)
            - Eurypterygia
              - Aulopa
                Aulopiformes (lizardfish)
              - Ctenosquamata
                - Scopelomorpha
                  Myctophiformes (lanternfish)
                - Acanthomorpha
                  - - Lampripterygii
                      Lampriformes (oarfish, opah, ribbonfish)
                    - Paracanthopterygii
                      - Percopsiformes (troutperches)
                      - - Zeiformes (dories)
                        - - Stylephoriformes (tube-eyes/thread-fins)
                          - Gadiformes (cods)
                  - - Polymixiipterygii
                      Polymixiiformes (beardfish)
                    - Acanthopterygii
                      - - Berycimorphaceae
                          - Beryciformes (alfonsinos, whalefishes)
                          - Trachichthyiformes (pinecone fishes, slimeheads)
                      - - Holocentrimorphaceae
                          Holocentriformes (squirrelfish, soldier fishes)
                        - Percomorpha

The most diverse group of teleost fish today are the Percomorpha, which include, among others, the tuna, seahorses, gobies, cichlids, flatfish, wrasse, perches, anglerfish, and pufferfish. Teleosts, and percomorphs in particular, thrived during the Cenozoic era. Fossil evidence shows that there was a major increase in size and abundance of teleosts immediately after the mass extinction event at the Cretaceous-Paleogene boundary ca. 66 mya.

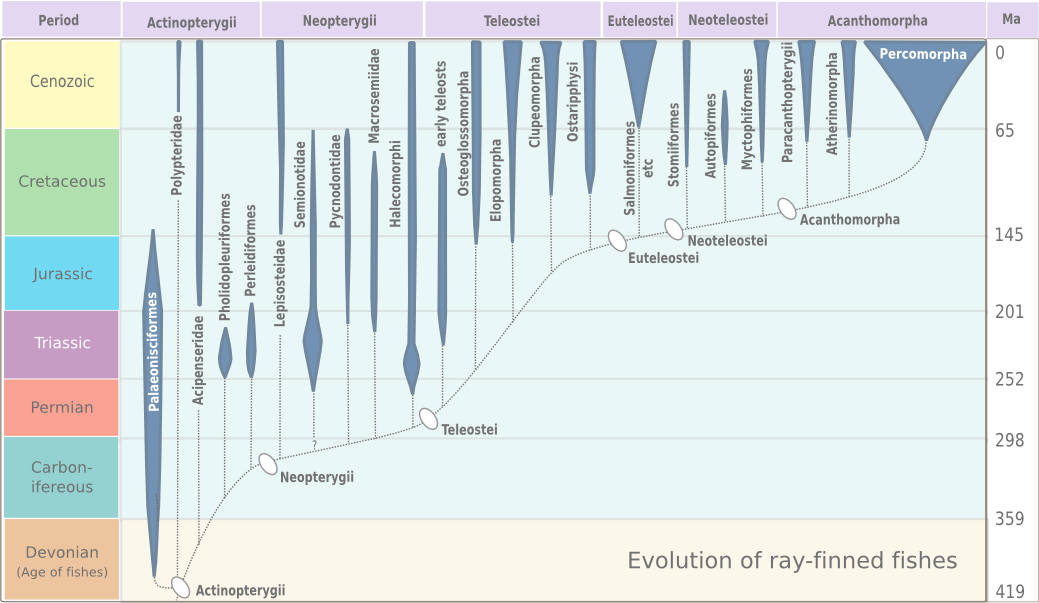
Evolution of ray-finned fishes, Actinopterygii, from the Devonian to the present as a spindle diagram. The width of the spindles are proportional to the number of families as a rough estimate of diversity. The diagram is based on Benton, M. J. (2005) Vertebrate Palaeontology, Blackwell, 3rd edition, Fig 7.13 on page 185.

=== Evolutionary trends ===
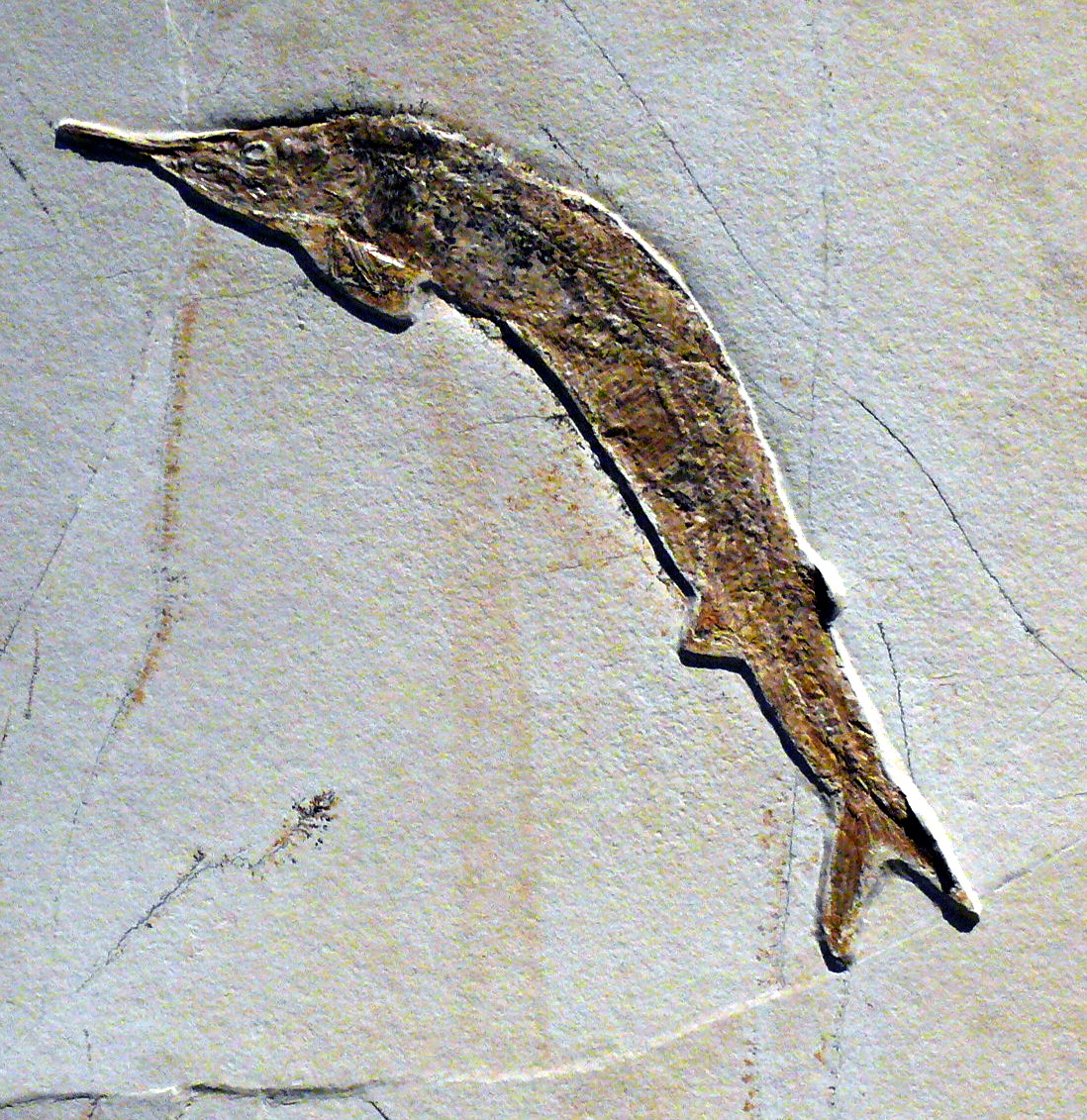
Aspidorhynchus acustirostris, an early teleost from the Middle Jurassic

The first fossils assignable to this diverse group appear in the Early Triassic, after which teleosts accumulated novel body shapes predominantly gradually for the first 150 million years of their evolution (Early Triassic through early Cretaceous).

The most basal of the living teleosts are the Elopomorpha (eels and allies) and the Osteoglossomorpha (elephantfishes and allies). There are 800 species of elopomorphs. They have thin leaf-shaped larvae known as leptocephali, specialised for a marine environment. Among the elopomorphs, eels have elongated bodies with lost pelvic girdles and ribs and fused elements in the upper jaw. The 200 species of osteoglossomorphs are defined by a bony element in the tongue. This element has a basibranchial behind it, and both structures have large teeth which are paired with the teeth on the parasphenoid in the roof of the mouth. The clade Otocephala includes the Clupeiformes (herrings) and Ostariophysi (carps, catfishes and allies). Clupeiformes consists of 350 living species of herring and herring-like fishes. This group is characterised by an unusual abdominal scute and a different arrangement of the hypurals. In most species, the swim bladder extends to the braincase and plays a role in hearing. Ostariophysi, which includes most freshwater fishes, includes species that have developed some unique adaptations. One is the Weberian apparatus, an arrangement of bones (Weberian ossicles) connecting the swim bladder to the inner ear. This enhances their hearing, as sound waves make the bladder vibrate, and the bones transport the vibrations to the inner ear. They also have a chemical alarm system; when a fish is injured, the warning substance gets in the water, alarming nearby fish.

The majority of teleost species belong to the clade Euteleostei, which consists of 17,419 species classified in 2,935 genera and 346 families. Shared traits of the euteleosts include similarities in the embryonic development of the bony or cartilaginous structures located between the head and dorsal fin (supraneural bones), an outgrowth on the stegural bone (a bone located near the neural arches of the tail), and caudal median cartilages located between hypurals of the caudal base. The majority of euteleosts are in the clade Neoteleostei. A derived trait of neoteleosts is a muscle that controls the pharyngeal jaws, giving them a role in grinding food. Within neoteleosts, members of the Acanthopterygii have a spiny dorsal fin which is in front of the soft-rayed dorsal fin. This fin helps provide thrust in locomotion and may also play a role in defense. Acanthomorphs have developed spiny ctenoid scales (as opposed to the cycloid scales of other groups), tooth-bearing premaxilla and greater adaptations to high speed swimming.

The adipose fin, which is present in over 6,000 teleost species, is often thought to have evolved once in the lineage and to have been lost multiple times due to its limited function. A 2014 study challenges this idea and suggests that the adipose fin is an example of convergent evolution. In Characiformes, the adipose fin develops from an outgrowth after the reduction of the larval fin fold, while in Salmoniformes, the fin appears to be a remnant of the fold.

=== Diversity ===
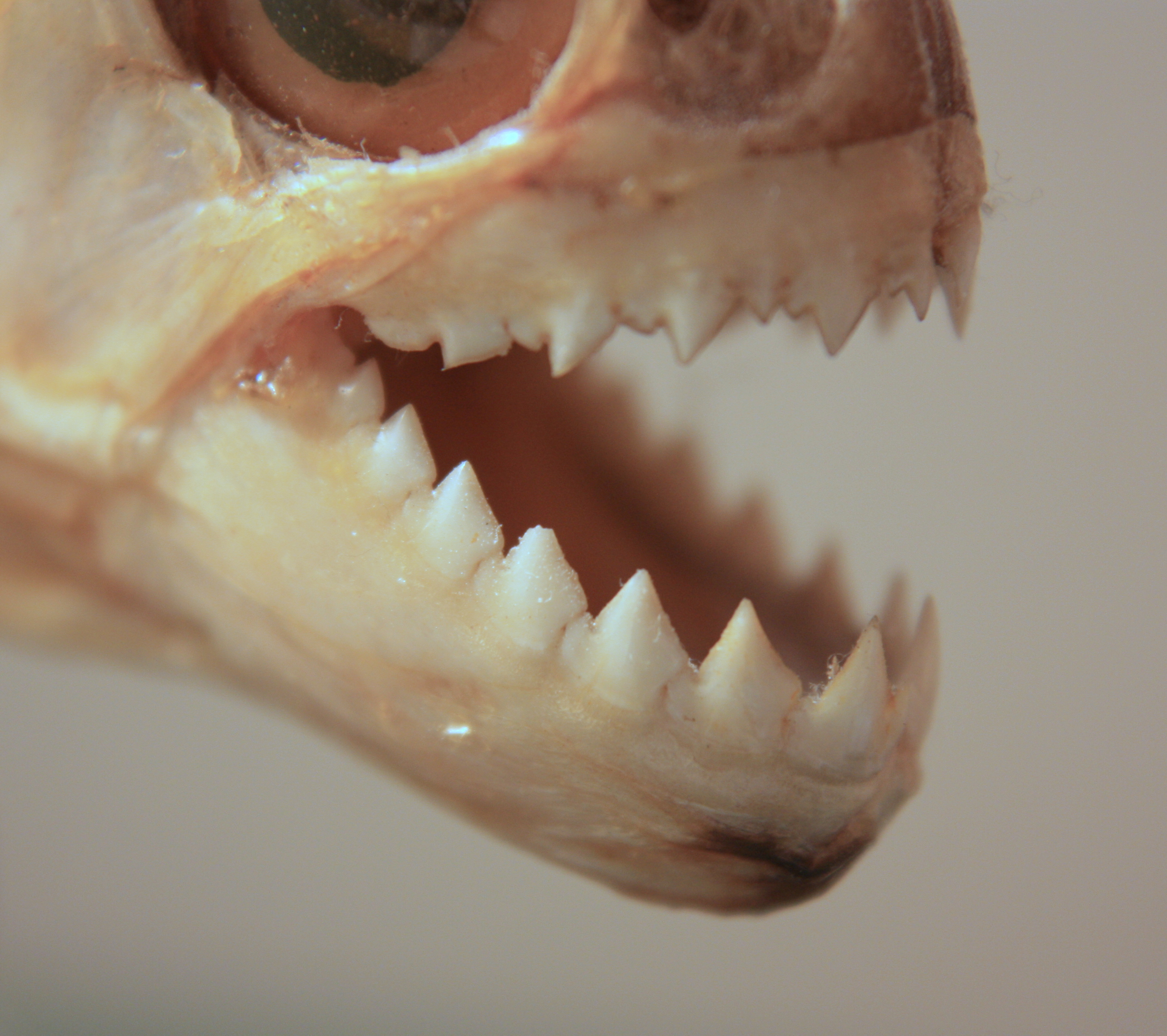
Predatory teleost: the flesh-cutting teeth of a piranha (Serrasalmidae)

There are over 26,000 species of teleosts, in about 40 orders and 448 families, making up 96% of all extant species of fish. Approximately 12,000 of the total 26,000 species are found in freshwater habitats. Teleosts are found in almost every aquatic environment and have developed specializations to feed in a variety of ways as carnivores, herbivores, filter feeders and parasites. The longest teleost is the giant oarfish, reported at 7.6 m (25 ft) and more, but this is dwarfed by the extinct Leedsichthys, one individual of which has been estimated to have a length of 27.6 m (91 ft). The heaviest teleost is believed to be the ocean sunfish, with a specimen landed in 2003 having an estimated weight of 2.3 t (2.3 long tons; 2.5 short tons), while the smallest fully mature adult is the male anglerfish Photocorynus spiniceps which can measure just 6.2 mm (0.24 in), though the female at 50 mm (2 in) is much larger. And Paedocypris progenetica is one of the smallest vertebrates.

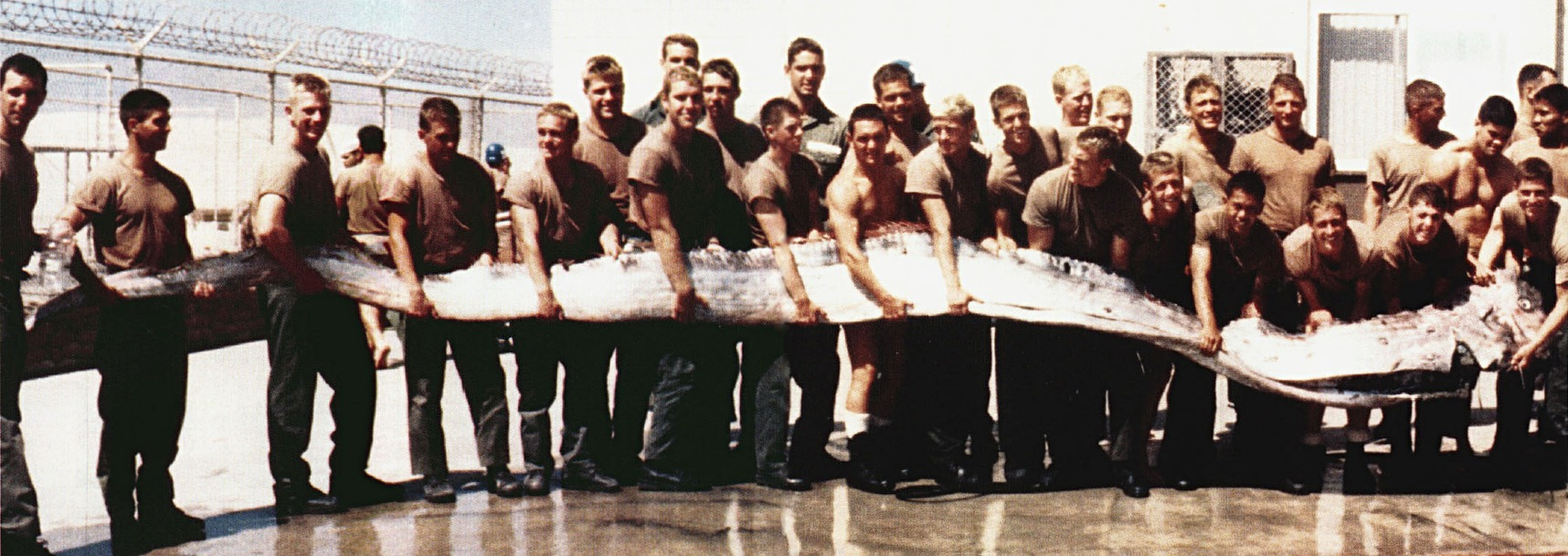
A rare giant oarfish (Regalecus glesne), 7-metre (23 ft) long, captured in 1996

Open water fish are usually streamlined like torpedoes to minimize turbulence as they move through the water. Reef fish live in a complex, relatively confined underwater landscape and for them, manoeuvrability is more important than speed, and many of them have developed bodies which optimize their ability to dart and change direction. Many have laterally compressed bodies (flattened from side to side) allowing them to fit into fissures and swim through narrow gaps; some use their pectoral fins for locomotion and others undulate their dorsal and anal fins. Some fish have grown dermal (skin) appendages for camouflage; the prickly leather-jacket is almost invisible among the seaweed it resembles and the tasselled scorpionfish invisibly lurks on the seabed ready to ambush prey. Some like the foureye butterflyfish have eyespots to startle or deceive, while others such as lionfish have aposematic coloration to warn that they are toxic or have venomous spines.

Flatfish are demersal fish (bottom-feeding fish) that show a greater degree of asymmetry than any other vertebrates. The larvae are at first bilaterally symmetrical but they undergo metamorphosis during the course of their development, with one eye migrating to the other side of the head, and they simultaneously start swimming on their side. This has the advantage that, when they lie on the seabed, both eyes are on top, giving them a broad field of view. The upper side is usually speckled and mottled for camouflage, while the underside is pale.

Some teleosts are parasites. Remoras have their front dorsal fins modified into large suckers with which they cling onto a host animal such as a whale, sea turtle, shark or ray, but this is probably a commensal rather than parasitic arrangement because both remora and host benefit from the removal of ectoparasites and loose flakes of skin. More harmful are the catfish that enter the gill chambers of fish and feed on their blood and tissues. The snubnosed eel, though usually a scavenger, sometimes bores into the flesh of a fish, and has been found inside the heart of a shortfin mako shark.

Some species, such as electric eels, can produce powerful electric currents, strong enough to stun prey. Other fish, such as knifefish, generate and sense weak electric fields to detect their prey; they swim with straight backs to avoid distorting their electric fields. These currents are produced by modified muscle or nerve cells.

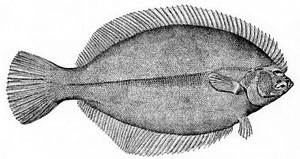
The winter flounder is asymmetrical, with both eyes lying on the same side of the head.

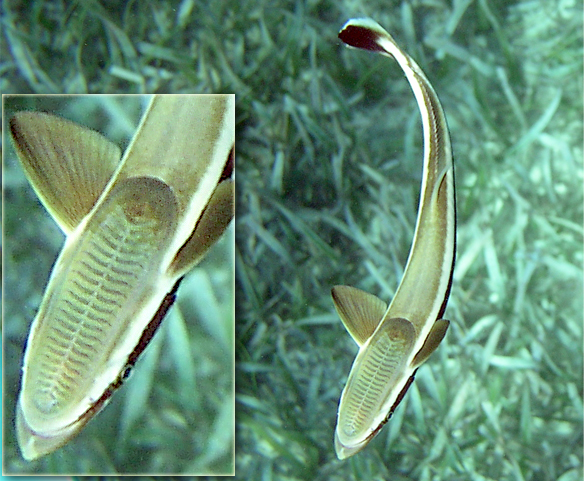
Commensal fish: a remora holds on to its host with a sucker-like organ (detail inset)

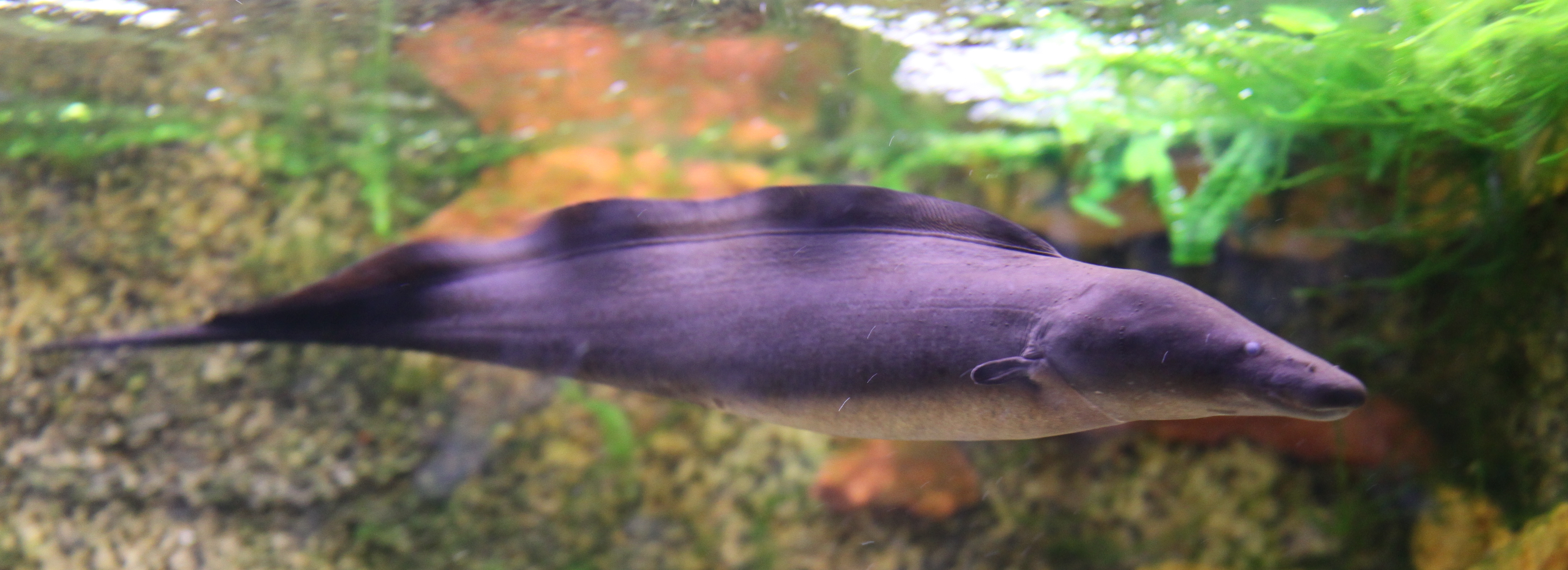
The knifefish Gymnarchus niloticus generates weak electric fields enabling it to detect and locate prey in turbid water.

== Distribution ==
Teleosts are found worldwide and in most aquatic environments, including warm and cold seas, flowing and still freshwater, and even, in the case of the desert pupfish, isolated and sometimes hot and saline bodies of water in deserts. Teleost diversity becomes low at extremely high latitudes; at Franz Josef Land, up to 82°N, ice cover and water temperatures below 0 °C (32 °F) for a large part of the year limit the number of species; 75 percent of the species found there are endemic to the Arctic.

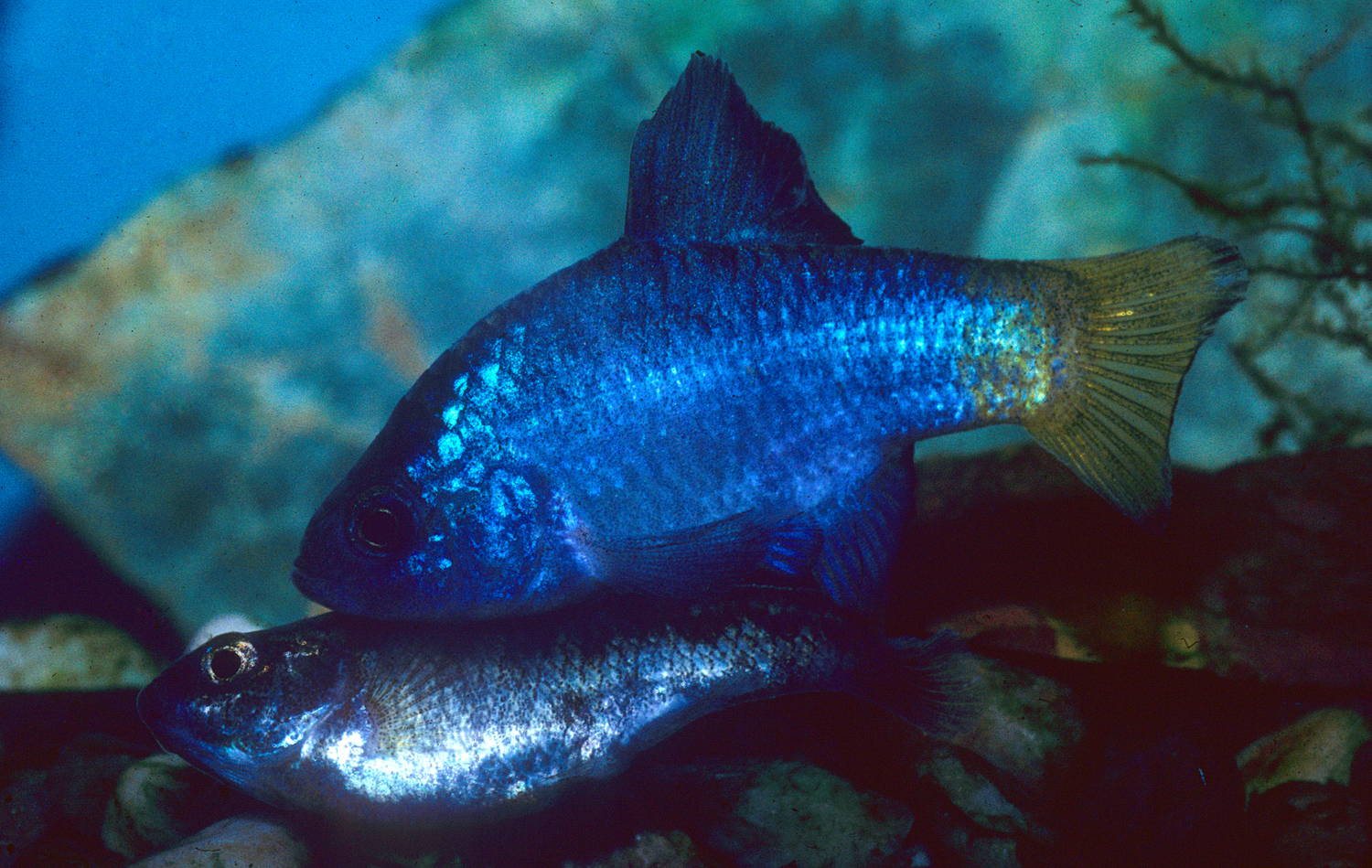
Fish in a hot desert: the desert pupfish

Of the major groups of teleosts, the Elopomorpha, Clupeomorpha and Percomorpha (perches, tunas and many others) all have a worldwide distribution and are mainly marine; the Ostariophysi and Osteoglossomorpha are worldwide but mainly freshwater, the latter mainly in the tropics; the Atherinomorpha (guppies, etc.) have a worldwide distribution, both fresh and salt, but are surface-dwellers. In contrast, the Esociformes (pikes) are limited to freshwater in the Northern Hemisphere, while the Salmoniformes (salmon, trout) are found in both Northern and Southern temperate zones in freshwater, some species migrating to and from the sea. The Paracanthopterygii (cods, etc.) are Northern Hemisphere fish, with both salt and freshwater species.

Some teleosts are migratory; certain freshwater species move within river systems on an annual basis; other species are anadromous, spending their lives at sea and moving inland to spawn, salmon and striped bass being examples. Others, exemplified by the eel, are catadromous, doing the reverse. The fresh water European eel migrates across the Atlantic Ocean as an adult to breed in floating seaweed in the Sargasso Sea. The adults spawn here and then die, but the developing young are swept by the Gulf Stream towards Europe. By the time they arrive, they are small fish and enter estuaries and ascend rivers, overcoming obstacles in their path to reach the streams and ponds where they spend their adult lives.

Teleosts including the brown trout and the scaly osman are found in mountain lakes in Kashmir at altitudes as high as 3,819 m (12,530 ft). Teleosts are found at extreme depths in the oceans; the hadal snailfish has been seen at a depth of 7,700 m (25,300 ft), and a related (unnamed) species has been seen at 8,145 m (26,720 ft).

== Physiology ==
=== Respiration ===
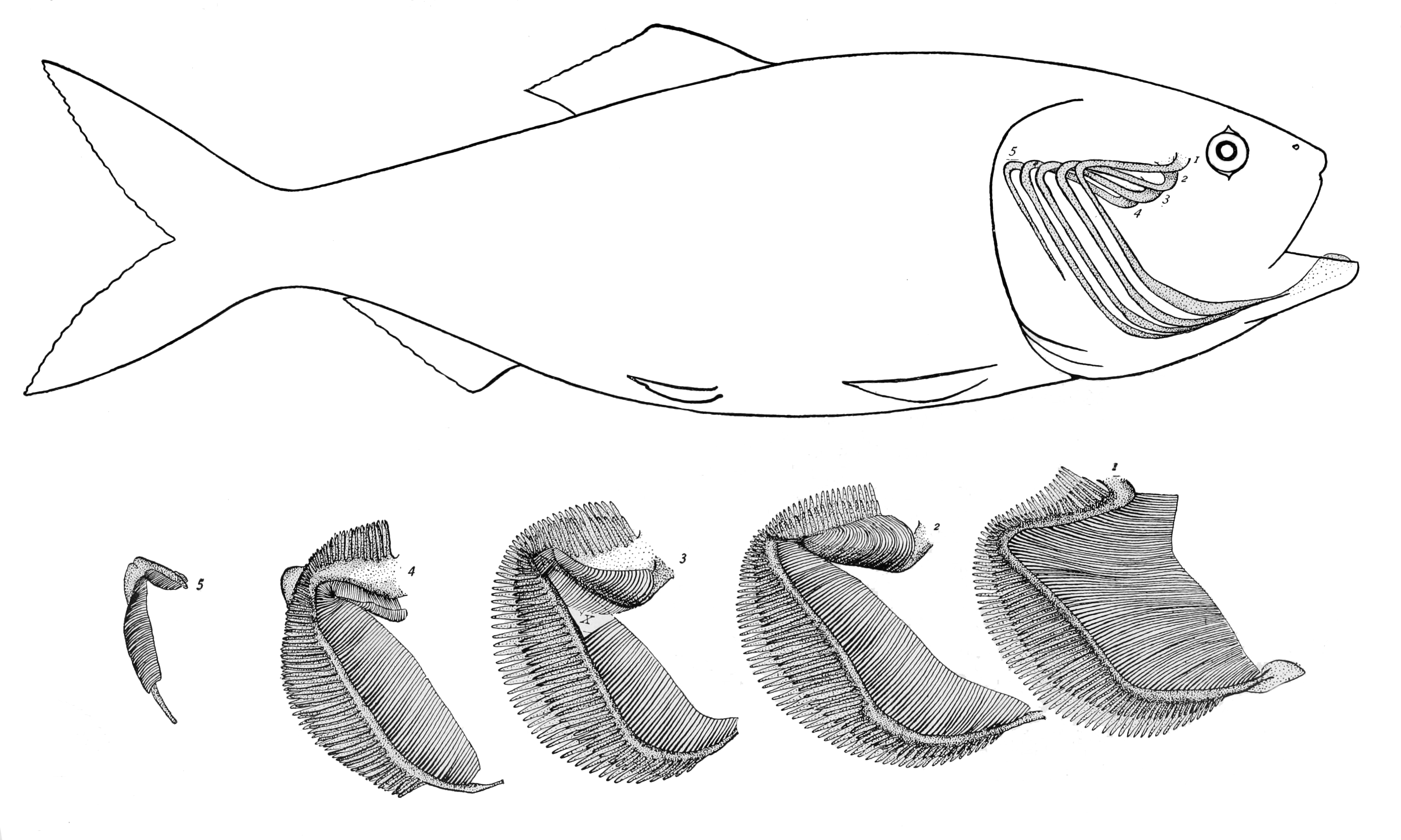
Gills

The major means of respiration in teleosts, as in most other fish, is the transfer of gases over the surface of the gills as water is drawn in through the mouth and pumped out through the gills. Apart from the swim bladder, which contains a small amount of air, the body does not have oxygen reserves, and respiration needs to be continuous over the fish's life. Some teleosts exploit habitats where the oxygen availability is low, such as stagnant water or wet mud; they have developed accessory tissues and organs to support gas exchange in these habitats.

Several genera of teleosts have independently developed air-breathing capabilities, and some have become amphibious. Some combtooth blennies emerge to feed on land, and freshwater eels are able to absorb oxygen through damp skin. Mudskippers can remain out of water for considerable periods, exchanging gases through skin and mucous membranes in the mouth and pharynx. Swamp eels have similar well-vascularised mouth-linings, and can remain out of water for days and go into a resting state (aestivation) in mud. The anabantoids have developed an accessory breathing structure known as the labyrinth organ on the first gill arch and this is used for respiration in air, and airbreathing catfish have a similar suprabranchial organ. Certain other catfish, such as the Loricariidae, are able to respire through air held in their digestive tracts.

=== Sensory systems ===
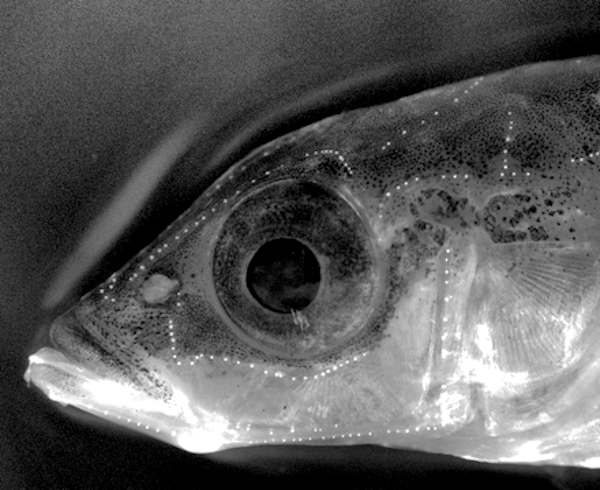
A stickleback stained to show the lateral line elements (neuromasts)

Teleosts possess highly developed sensory organs. Nearly all daylight fish have colour vision at least as good as a normal human's. Many fish also have chemoreceptors responsible for acute senses of taste and smell. Most fish have sensitive receptors that form the lateral line system, which detects gentle currents and vibrations, and senses the motion of nearby fish and prey. Fish sense sounds in a variety of ways, using the lateral line, the swim bladder, and in some species the Weberian apparatus. Fish orient themselves using landmarks, and may use mental maps based on multiple landmarks or symbols. Experiments with mazes show that fish possess the spatial memory needed to make such a mental map.

=== Osmoregulation ===
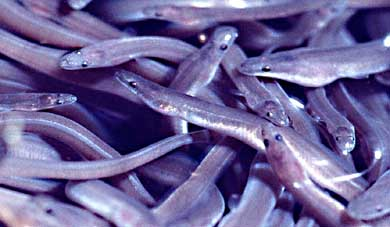
Osmotic challenge: American eels spawn in the sea but spend most of their adult life in freshwater, returning only to spawn.

The skin of a teleost is largely impermeable to water, and the main interface between the fish's body and its surroundings is the gills. In freshwater, teleost fish gain water across their gills by osmosis, while in seawater they lose it. Similarly, salts diffuse outwards across the gills in freshwater and inwards in salt water. The European flounder spends most of its life in the sea but often migrates into estuaries and rivers. In the sea in one hour, it can gain Na^{+} ions equivalent to forty percent of its total free sodium content, with 75 percent of this entering through the gills and the remainder through drinking. By contrast, in rivers there is an exchange of just two percent of the body Na^{+} content per hour. As well as being able to selectively limit salt and water exchanged by diffusion, there is an active mechanism across the gills for the elimination of salt in sea water and its uptake in fresh water.

=== Thermoregulation ===
Fish are cold-blooded, and in general their body temperature is the same as that of their surroundings. They gain and lose heat through their skin, and regulate their circulation in response to changes in water temperature by increasing or reducing the blood flow to the gills. Metabolic heat generated in the muscles or gut is quickly dissipated through the gills, with blood being diverted away from the gills during exposure to cold. Because of their relative inability to control their blood temperature, most teleosts can only survive in a small range of water temperatures.

Teleost species that inhabit colder waters have a higher proportion of unsaturated fatty acids in brain cell membranes compared to fish from warmer waters, which allows them to maintain appropriate membrane fluidity in the environments in which they live. When cold acclimated, teleost fish show physiological changes in skeletal muscle that include increased mitochondrial and capillary density. This reduces diffusion distances and aids in the production of aerobic ATP, which helps to compensate for the drop in metabolic rate associated with colder temperatures.

Tuna and other fast-swimming ocean-going fish maintain their muscles at higher temperatures than their environment for efficient locomotion. Tuna achieve muscle temperatures 11 °C (19 °F) or even higher above the surroundings by having a counterflow system in which the metabolic heat produced by the muscles and present in the venous blood, pre-warms the arterial blood before it reaches the muscles. Other adaptations of tuna for speed include a streamlined, spindle-shaped body, fins designed to reduce drag, and muscles with a raised myoglobin content, which gives these a reddish colour and makes for a more efficient use of oxygen. In polar regions and in the deep ocean, where the temperature is a few degrees above freezing point, some large fish, such as the swordfish, marlin and tuna, have a heating mechanism which raises the temperature of the brain and eye, allowing them significantly better vision than their cold-blooded prey.

=== Buoyancy ===
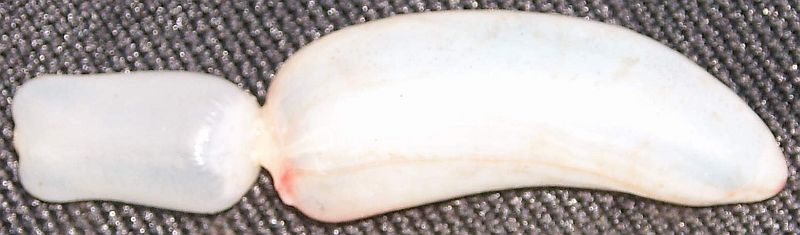
A teleost swim bladder

The body of a teleost is denser than water, so fish must compensate for the difference, or they will sink. A defining feature of Actinopteri (Chondrostei, Holostei and teleosts) is the swim bladder. Originally present in the last common ancestor of the teleosts, it has since been lost independently at least 30–32 times in at least 79 of 425 families of teleosts where the swim bladder is absent in one or more species. This absence is often the case in fast-swimming fishes such as the tuna and mackerel. The swim bladder helps fish adjusting their buoyancy through manipulation of gases, which allows them to stay at the current water depth, or ascend or descend without having to waste energy in swimming. In the more primitive groups like some minnows, the swim bladder is open (physostomous) to the esophagus. In fish where the swim bladder is closed (physoclistous), the gas content is controlled through the rete mirabilis, a network of blood vessels serving as a countercurrent gas exchanger between the swim bladder and the blood.

=== Locomotion ===
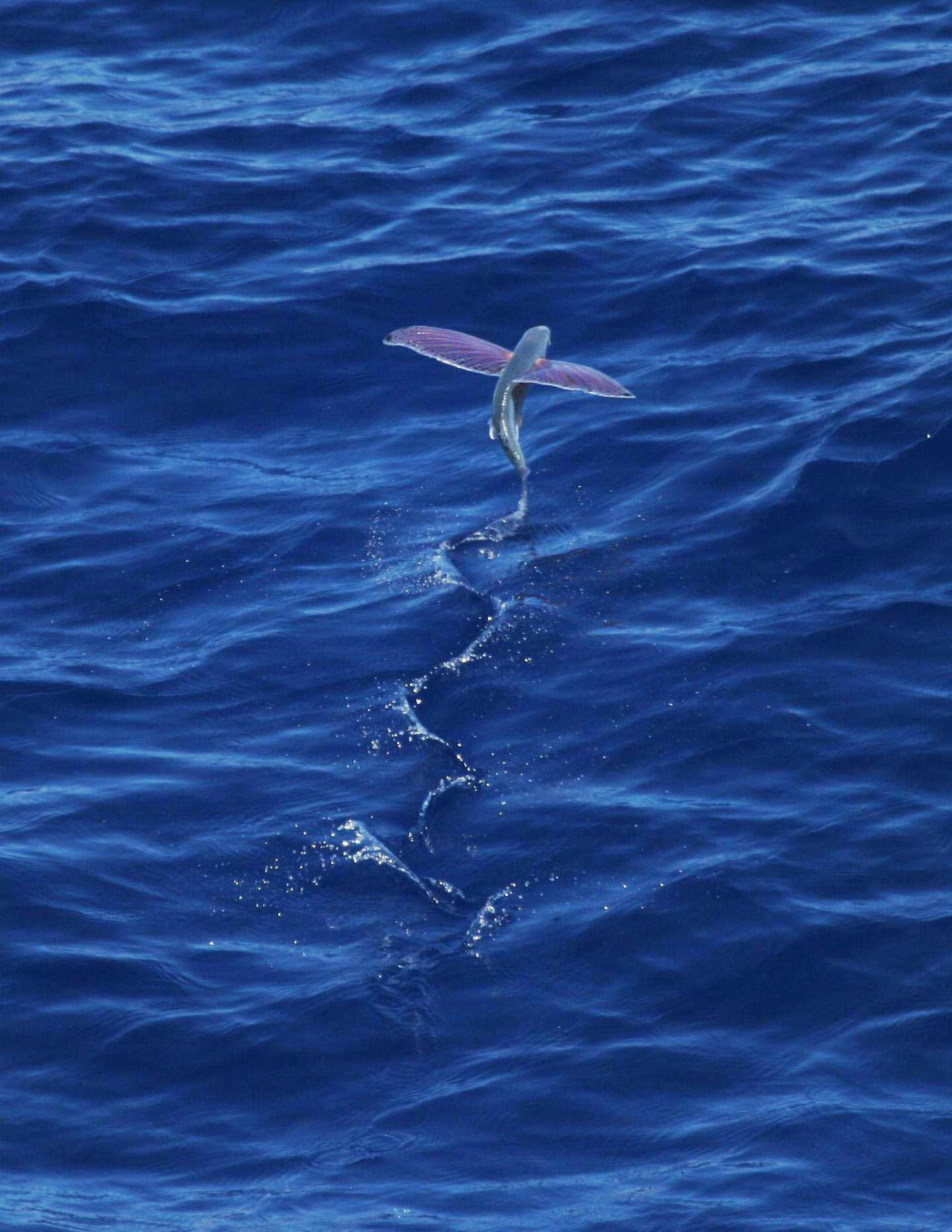
Flying fish combine swimming movements with the ability to glide in air using their long pectoral fins.

A typical teleost fish has a streamlined body for rapid swimming, and locomotion is generally provided by a lateral undulation of the hindmost part of the trunk and the tail, propelling the fish through the water. There are many exceptions to this method of locomotion, especially where speed is not the main objective; among rocks and on coral reefs, slow swimming with great manoeuvrability may be a desirable attribute. Eels locomote by wiggling their entire bodies. Living among seagrasses and algae, the seahorse adopts an upright posture and moves by fluttering its pectoral fins, and the closely related pipefish moves by rippling its elongated dorsal fin. Gobies "hop" along the substrate, propping themselves up and propelling themselves with their pectoral fins. Mudskippers move in much the same way on terrestrial ground. In some species, a pelvic sucker allows them to climb, and the Hawaiian freshwater goby climbs waterfalls while migrating. Gurnards have three pairs of free rays on their pectoral fins which have a sensory function but on which they can walk along the substrate. Flying fish launch themselves into the air and can glide on their enlarged pectoral fins for hundreds of metres.

=== Sound production ===
The ability to produce sound for communication appears to have evolved independently in several teleost lineages. Sounds are produced either by stridulation or by vibrating the swim bladder. In the Sciaenidae, the muscles that attach to the swim bladder cause it to oscillate rapidly, creating drumming sounds. Marine catfishes, sea horses and grunts stridulate by rubbing together skeletal parts, teeth or spines. In these fish, the swim bladder may act as a resonator. Stridulation sounds are predominantly from 1000–4000 Hz, though sounds modified by the swim bladder have frequencies lower than 1000 Hz.

== Reproduction and lifecycle ==
Sockeye salmon spawns, which breed only once and then die soon afterwards

Most teleost species are oviparous, having external fertilisation with both eggs and sperm being released into the water for fertilisation. Internal fertilisation occurs in 500 to 600 species of teleosts but is more typical for Chondrichthyes and many tetrapods. This involves the male inseminating the female with an intromittent organ. Fewer than one in a million of externally fertilised eggs survives to develop into a mature fish, but there is a much better chance of survival among the offspring of members of about a dozen families which are viviparous. In these, the eggs are fertilised internally and retained in the female during development. Some of these species, like the live-bearing aquarium fish in the family Poeciliidae, are ovoviviparous; each egg has a yolk sac which nourishes the developing embryo, and when this is exhausted, the egg hatches and the larva is expelled into the water column. Other species, like the splitfins in the family Goodeidae, are fully viviparous, with the developing embryo nurtured from the maternal blood supply via a placenta-like structure that develops in the uterus. Oophagy is practised by a few species, such as Nomorhamphus ebrardtii; the mother lays unfertilised eggs on which the developing larvae feed in the uterus, and intrauterine cannibalism has been reported in some halfbeaks.

There are two major reproductive strategies of teleosts; semelparity and iteroparity. In the former, an individual breeds once after reaching maturity and then dies. This is because the physiological changes that come with reproduction eventually lead to death. Salmon of the genus Oncorhynchus are well known for this feature; they hatch in fresh water and then migrate to the sea for up to four years before travelling back to their place of birth where they spawn and die. Semelparity is also known to occur in some eels and smelts. The majority of teleost species have iteroparity, where mature individuals can breed multiple times during their lives.

=== Sex identity and determination ===
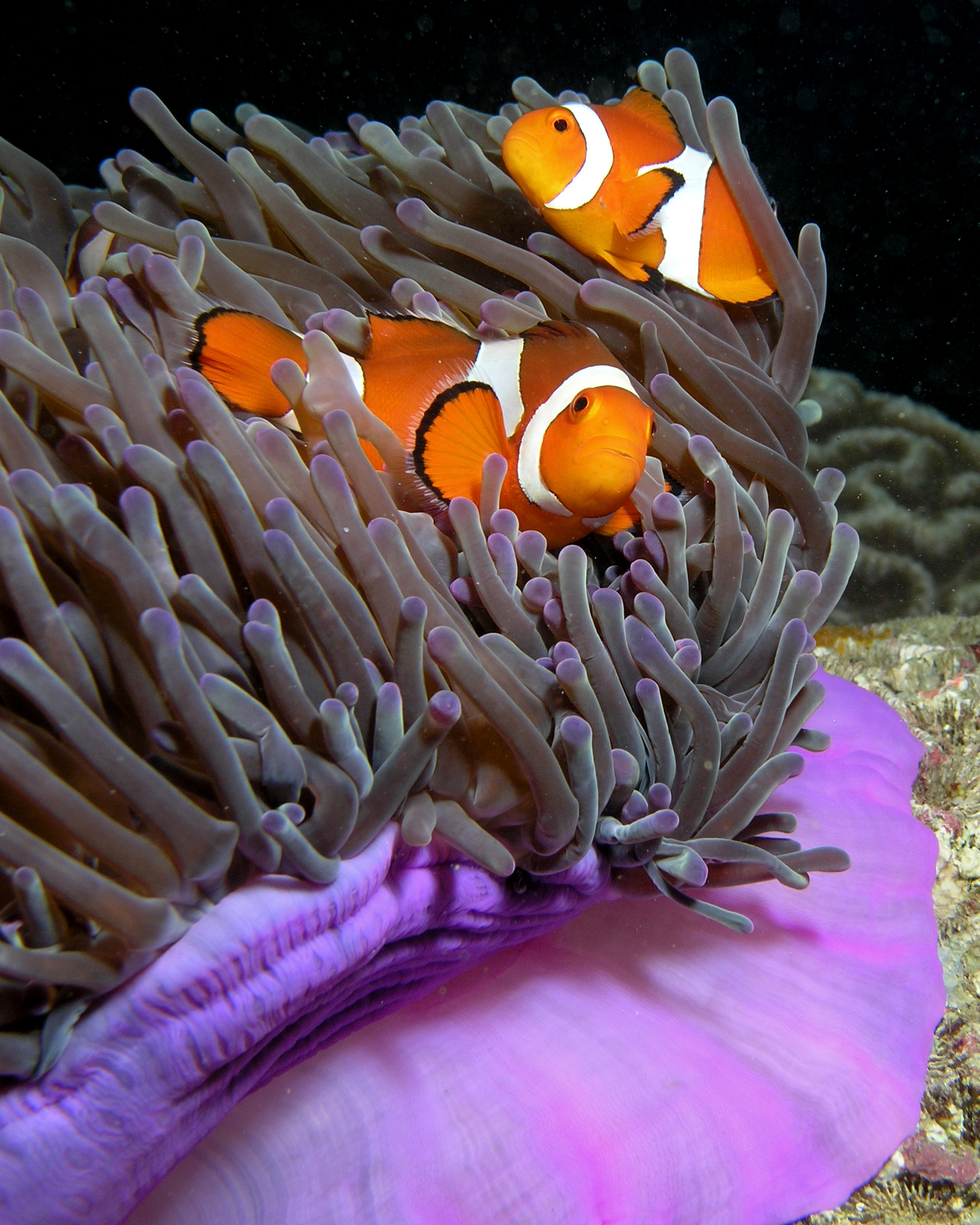
Clownfish are protandrous hermaphrodites; when the female of a breeding pair dies, the male changes sex and a subordinate male takes his place as the breeding male.

88 percent of teleost species are gonochoristic, having individuals that remain either male or female throughout their adult lives. The sex of an individual can be determined genetically as in birds and mammals, or environmentally as in reptiles. In some teleosts, both genetics and the environment play a role in determining sex. For species whose sex is determined by genetics, it can come in three forms. In monofactorial sex determination, a single-locus determines sex inheritance. Both the XY sex-determination system and ZW sex-determination system exist in teleost species. Some species, such as the southern platyfish, have both systems and a male can be determined by XY or ZZ depending on the population.

Multifactorial sex determination occurs in numerous Neotropical species and involves both XY and ZW systems. Multifactorial systems involve rearrangements of sex chromosomes and autosomes. For example, the darter characine has a ZW multifactorial system where the female is determined by ZW_{1}W_{2} and the male by ZZ. The wolf fish has a XY multifactorial system where females are determined by X_{1}X_{1}X_{2}X_{2} and the male by X_{1}X_{2}Y. Some teleosts, such as zebrafish, have a polyfactorial system, where there are several genes which play a role in determining sex. Environment-dependent sex determination has been documented in at least 70 species of teleost. Temperature is the main factor, but pH levels, growth rate, density and social environment may also play a role. For the Atlantic silverside, spawning in colder waters creates more females, while warmer waters create more males.

==== Hermaphroditism ====
Some teleost species are hermaphroditic, which can come in two forms: simultaneous and sequential. In the former, both spermatozoa and eggs are present in the gonads. Simultaneous hermaphroditism typically occurs in species that live in the ocean depths, where potential mates are sparsely dispersed. Self-fertilisation is rare and has only been recorded in two species, Kryptolebias marmoratus and Kryptolebias hermaphroditus. With sequential hermaphroditism, individuals may function as one sex early in their adult life and switch later in life. Species with this condition include parrotfish, wrasses, sea basses, flatheads, sea breams and lightfishes.

Protandry is when an individual starts out male and becomes female while the reverse condition is known as protogyny, the latter being more common. Changing sex can occur in various contexts. In the bluestreak cleaner wrasse, where males have harems of up to ten females, if the male is removed the largest and most dominant female develops male-like behaviour and eventually testes. If she is removed, the next ranking female takes her place. In the species Anthias squamipinnis, where individuals gather into large groups and females greatly outnumber males, if a certain number of males are removed from a group, the same number of females change sex and replace them. In clownfish, individuals live in groups and only the two largest in a group breed: the largest female and the largest male. If the female dies, the male switches sexes and the next largest male takes his place.

In deep-sea anglerfish (sub-order Ceratioidei), the much smaller male becomes permanently attached to the female and degenerates into a sperm-producing attachment. The female and their attached male become a "semi-hermaphroditic unit".

=== Mating tactics ===
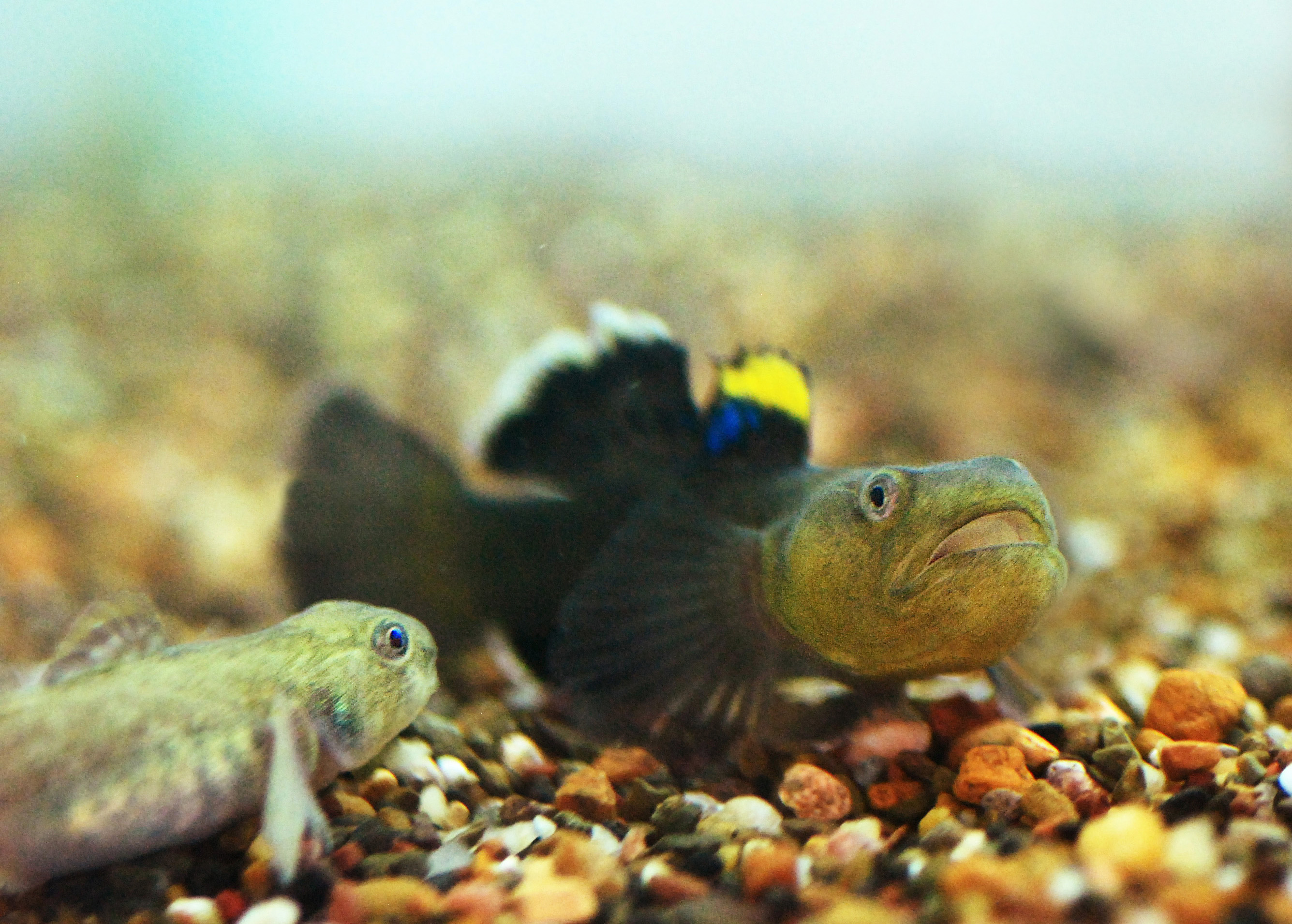
Male desert goby courting a female

There are several different mating systems among teleosts. Some species are promiscuous, where both males and females breed with multiple partners and there are no obvious mate choices. This has been recorded in Baltic herring, Guppies, Nassau groupers, humbug damselfish, cichlids and creole wrasses. Polygamy, where one sex has multiple partners can come in many forms. Polyandry consists of one adult female breeding with multiple males, which only breed with that female. This is rare among teleosts, and fish in general, but is found in the clownfish. In addition, it may also exist to an extent among anglerfish, where some females have more than one male attached to them. Polygyny, where one male breeds with multiple females, is much more common. This is recorded in Sculpins, sunfish, darters, damselfish and cichlids where multiple females may visit a territorial male that guards and takes care of eggs and young. Polygyny may also involve a male guarding a harem of several females. This occurs in coral reef species, such as damselfishes, wrasses, parrotfishes, surgeonfishes, triggerfishes and tilefishes.

Lek breeding, where males congregate to display to females, has been recorded in at least one species Cyrtocara eucinostomus. Lek-like breeding systems have also been recorded in several other species. In monogamous species, males and females may form pair bonds and breed exclusively with their partners. This occurs in North American freshwater catfishes, many butterflyfishes, sea horses and several other species. Courtship in teleosts plays a role in species recognition, strengthening pair bonds, spawning site position and gamete release synchronisation. This includes colour changes, sound production and visual displays (fin erection, rapid swimming, breaching), which is often done by the male. Courtship may be done by a female to overcome a territorial male that would otherwise drive her away.

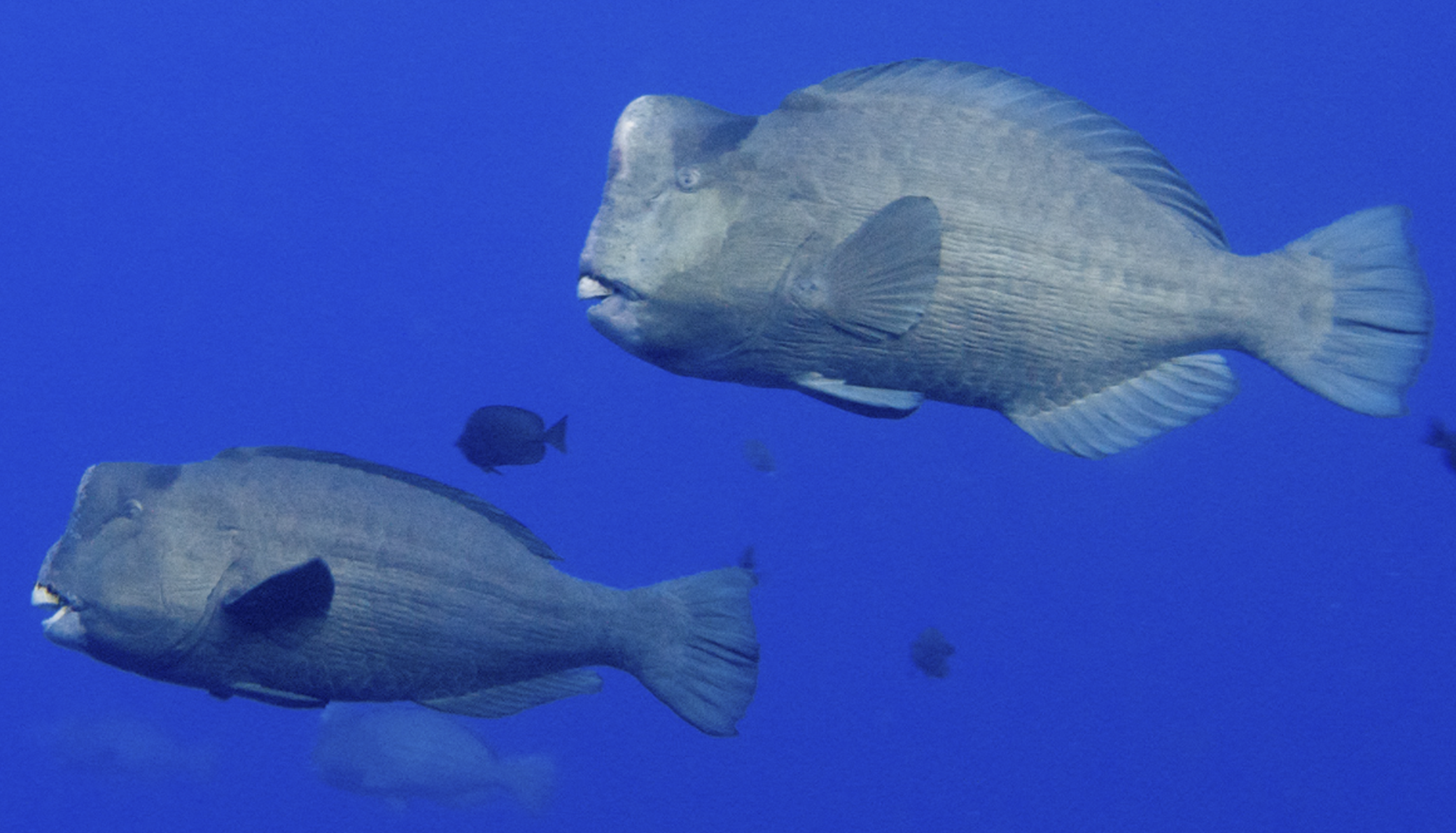
Male (top) and female humphead parrotfish, showing sexual dimorphism

Sexual dimorphism exists in some species. Individuals of one sex, usually males develop secondary sexual characteristics that increase their chances of reproductive success. In dolphinfish, males have larger and blunter heads than females. In several minnow species, males develop swollen heads and small bumps known as breeding tubercles during the breeding season. The male green humphead parrotfish has a more well-developed forehead with an "ossified ridge" which plays a role in ritualised headbutting. Dimorphism can also take the form of differences in coloration. Again, it is usually the males that are brightly coloured; in killifishes, rainbowfishes and wrasses the colours are permanent while in species like minnows, sticklebacks, darters and sunfishes, the colour changes with seasons. Such coloration can be very conspicuous to predators, showing that the drive to reproduce can be stronger than that to avoid predation.

Males that have been unable to court a female successfully may try to achieve reproductive success in other ways. In sunfish species, like the bluegill, larger, older males known as parental males, which have successfully courted a female, construct nests for the eggs they fertilise. Smaller satellite males mimic female behaviour and coloration to access a nest and fertilise the eggs. Other males, known as sneaker males, lurk nearby and then quickly dash to the nest, fertilising on the run. These males are smaller than satellite males. Sneaker males also exist in Oncorhynchus salmon, where small males that were unable to establish a position near a female dash in while the large dominant male is spawning with the female.

=== Spawning sites and parental care ===
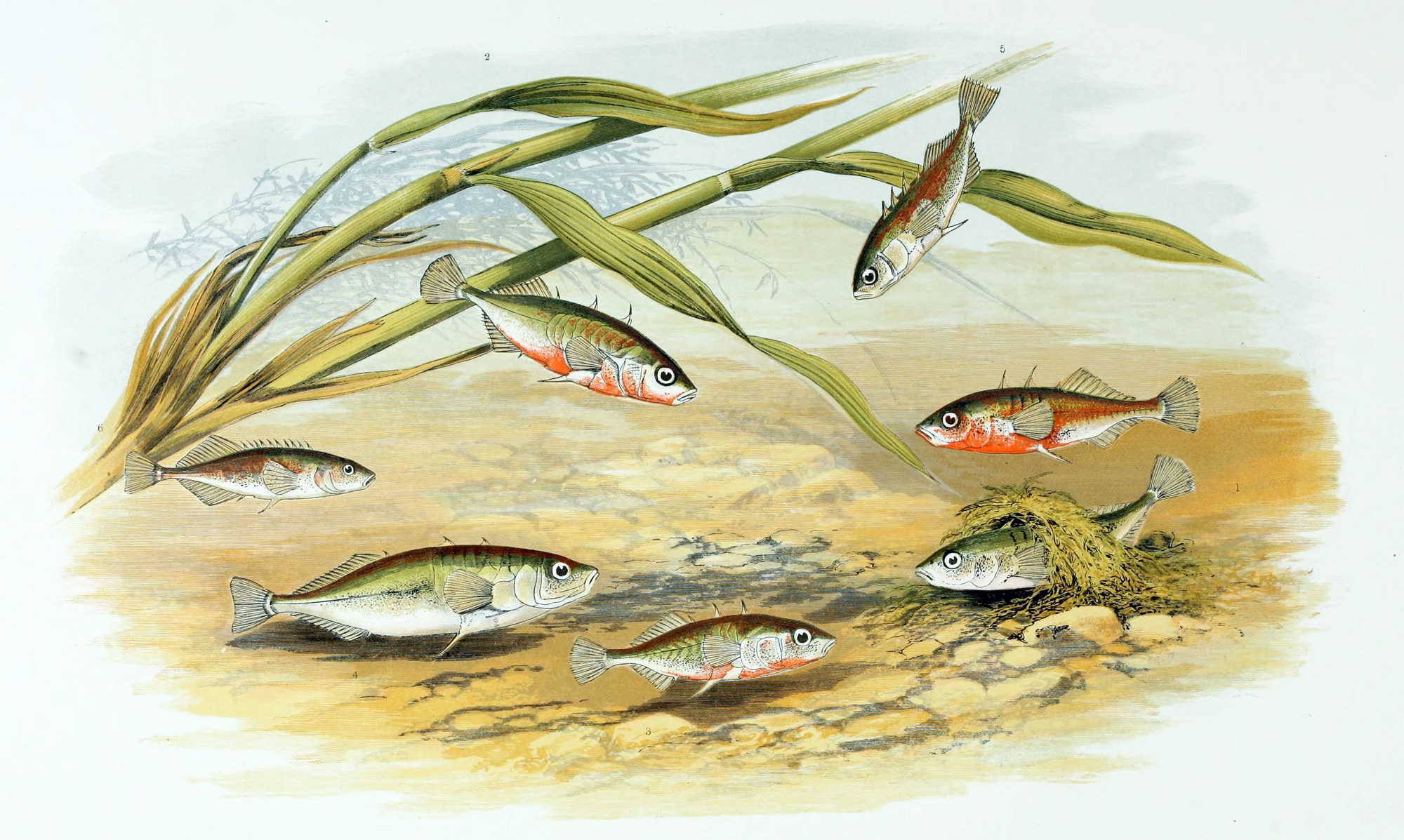
Three-spined stickleback males (red belly) build nests and compete to attract females to lay eggs in them. Males then defend and fan the eggs. Painting by Alexander Francis Lydon, 1879

Teleosts may spawn in the water column or, more commonly, on the substrate. Water column spawners are mostly limited to coral reefs; the fish will rush towards the surface and release their gametes. This appears to protect the eggs from some predators and allow them to disperse widely via currents. They receive no parental care. Water column spawners are more likely than substrate spawners to spawn in groups. Substrate spawning commonly occurs in nests, rock crevices or even burrows. Some eggs can stick to various surfaces like rocks, plants, wood or shells.

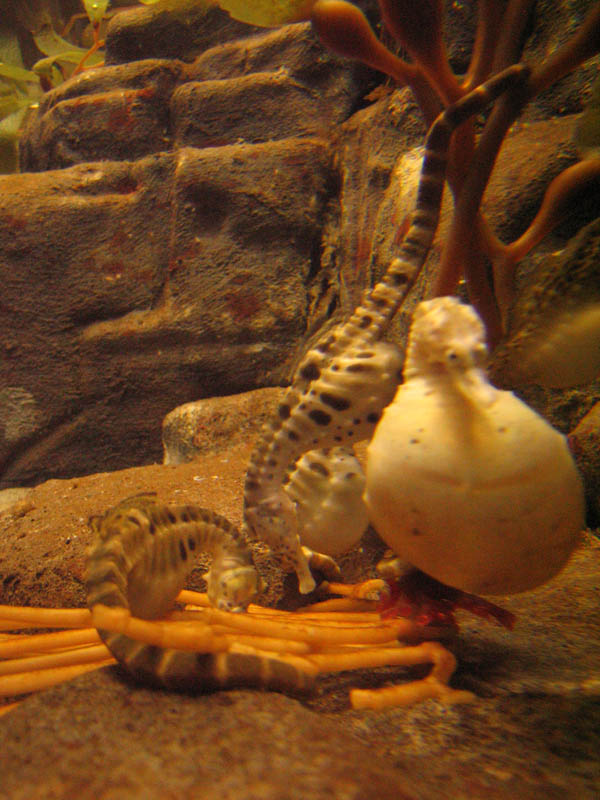
"Pregnant" male seahorse

Of the oviparous teleosts, most (79 percent) do not provide parental care. Male care is far more common than female care. Male territoriality "preadapts" a species to evolve male parental care. One unusual example of female parental care is in discuses, which provide nutrients for their developing young in the form of mucus. Some teleost species have their eggs or young attached to or carried in their bodies. For sea catfishes, cardinalfishes, jawfishes and some others, the egg may be incubated or carried in the mouth, a practice known as mouthbrooding. In some African cichlids, the eggs may be fertilised there. In species like the banded acara, young are brooded after they hatch and this may be done by both parents. The timing of the release of young varies between species; some mouthbrooders release new-hatched young while other may keep then until they are juveniles. In addition to mouthbrooding, some teleost have also developed structures to carry young. Male nurseryfish have a bony hook on their foreheads to carry fertilised eggs; they remain on the hook until they hatch. For seahorses, the male has a brooding pouch where the female deposits the fertilised eggs and they remain there until they become free-swimming juveniles. Female banjo catfishes have structures on their belly to which the eggs attach.

In some parenting species, young from a previous spawning batch may stay with their parents and help care for the new young. This is known to occur in around 19 species of cichlids in Lake Tanganyika. These helpers take part in cleaning and fanning eggs and larvae, cleaning the breeding hole and protecting the territory. They have reduced growth rate but gain protection from predators. Brood parasitism also exists among teleosts; minnows may spawn in sunfish nests as well as nests of other minnow species. The cuckoo catfish is known for laying eggs on the substrate as mouthbrooding cichclids collect theirs and the young catfish will eat the cichlid larvae. Filial cannibalism occurs in some teleost families and may have evolved to combat starvation.

=== Growth and development ===
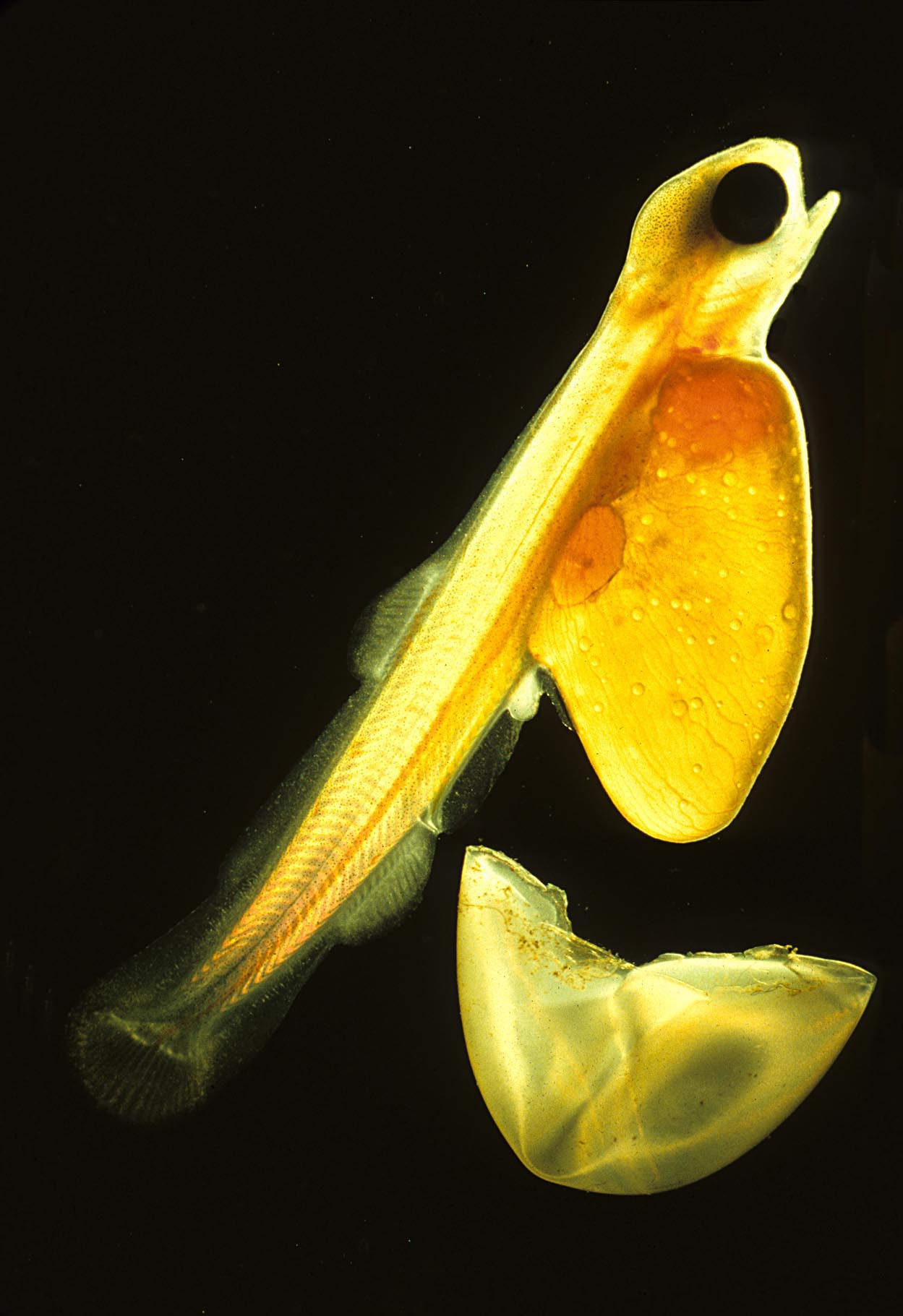
Newly hatched Atlantic salmon with yolk sac

Teleosts have four major life stages: the egg, the larva, the juvenile and the adult. Species may begin life in a pelagic environment or a demersal environment (near the seabed). Most marine teleosts have pelagic eggs, which are light, transparent and buoyant with thin envelopes. Pelagic eggs rely on the ocean currents to disperse and receive no parental care. When they hatch, the larvae are planktonic and unable to swim. They have a yolk sac attached to them which provides nutrients. Most freshwater species produce demersal eggs which are thick, pigmented, relatively heavy and able to stick to substrates. Parental care is much more common among freshwater fish. Unlike their pelagic counterparts, demersal larvae are able to swim and feed as soon as they hatch. Larval teleosts often look very different from adults, particularly in marine species. Some larvae were even considered different species from the adults. Larvae have high mortality rates, most die from starvation or predation within their first week. As they grow, survival rates increase and there is greater physiological tolerance and sensitivity, ecological and behavioural competence.

At the juvenile stage, a teleost looks more like its adult form. At this stage, its axial skeleton, internal organs, scales, pigmentation and fins are fully developed. The transition from larvae to juvenile can be short and fairly simple, lasting minutes or hours as in some damselfish, while in other species, like salmon, squirrelfish, gobies and flatfishes, the transition is more complex and takes several weeks to complete. At the adult stage, a teleost is able to produce viable gametes for reproduction. Like many fish, teleosts continue to grow throughout their lives. Longevity depends on the species with some gamefish like European perch and largemouth bass living up to 25 years. Rockfish appear to be the longest living teleosts with some species living over 100 years.

== Shoaling and schooling ==
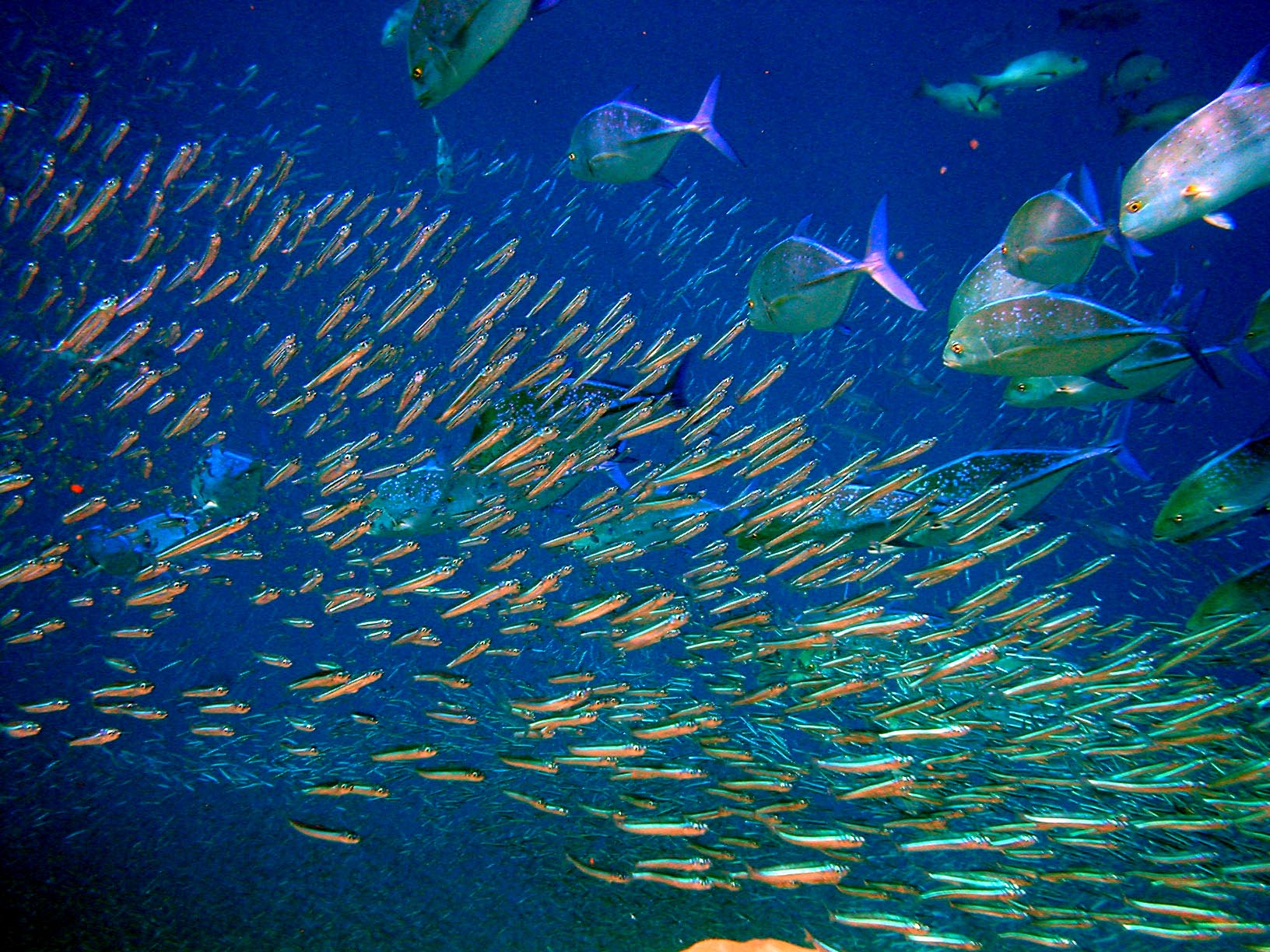
Schooling predatory bluefin trevally sizing up schooling anchovies

Many teleosts form shoals, which serve multiple purposes in different species. Schooling is sometimes an antipredator adaptation, offering improved vigilance against predators. It is often more efficient to gather food by working as a group, and individual fish optimise their strategies by choosing to join or leave a shoal. When a predator has been noticed, prey fish respond defensively, resulting in collective shoal behaviours such as synchronised movements. Responses do not consist only of attempting to hide or flee; antipredator tactics include for example scattering and reassembling. Fish also aggregate in shoals to spawn.

== Relationship with humans ==
=== Economic importance ===
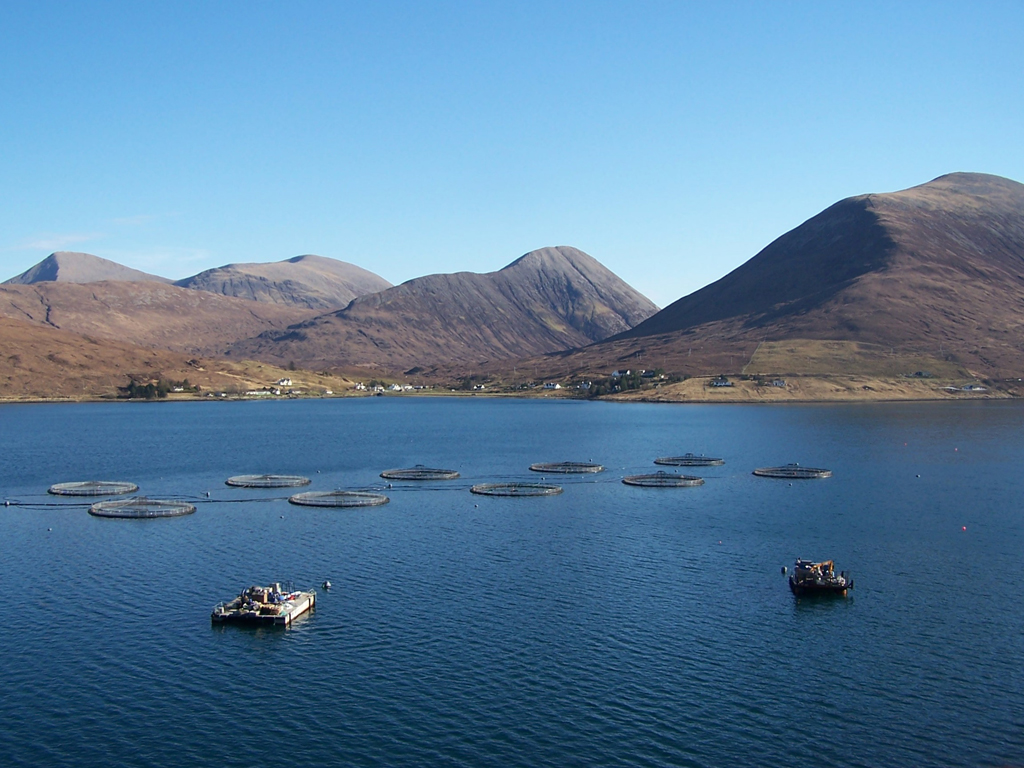
Fish farming in the sea off Scotland

Teleosts are economically important in different ways. They are captured for food around the world. A small number of species such as herring, cod, pollock, anchovy, tuna and mackerel provide people with millions of tons of food per year, while many other species are fished in smaller amounts. They provide a large proportion of the fish caught for sport. Commercial and recreational fishing together provide millions of people with employment.

A small number of productive species including carp, salmon, tilapia and catfish are farmed commercially, producing millions of tons of protein-rich food per year. in 2016 the UN's Food and Agriculture Organization expected production to increase sharply so that by 2030, perhaps sixty-two percent of food fish would be farmed.

Fish are consumed fresh, or may be preserved by traditional methods, which include combinations of drying, smoking, and salting, fermentation, and pickling in vinegar. Modern methods of preservation include freezing, freeze-drying, and heat processing (such as in the canning process). Frozen fish products include breaded or battered fillets, fish fingers and fishcakes. Fish meal is used as a food supplement for farmed fish and for livestock. Fish oils are made either from fish liver, especially rich in vitamins A and D, or from the bodies of oily fish such as sardine and herring, and used as food supplements and to treat vitamin deficiencies.

Some smaller and more colourful species serve as aquarium specimens and pets. Sea wolves are used in the leather industry. Isinglass is made from thread fish and drum fish.

=== Impact on stocks ===
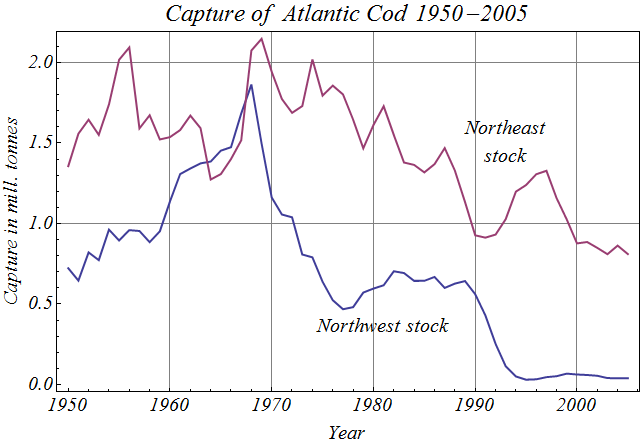
Capture of Atlantic Cod 1950–2005 (FAO)

Human activities have affected stocks of many species of teleost, through overfishing, pollution and global warming. Among many recorded instances, overfishing caused the complete collapse of the Atlantic cod population off Newfoundland in 1992, leading to Canada's indefinite closure of the fishery. Pollution, especially in rivers and along coasts, has harmed teleosts as sewage, pesticides and herbicides have entered the water. Many pollutants, such as heavy metals, organochlorines, and carbamates interfere with teleost reproduction, often by disrupting their endocrine systems. In the roach, river pollution has caused the intersex condition, in which an individual's gonads contain both cells that can make male gametes (such as spermatogonia) and cells that can make female gametes (such as oogonia). Since endocrine disruption also affects humans, teleosts are used to indicate the presence of such chemicals in water. Water pollution caused local extinction of teleost populations in many northern European lakes in the second half of the twentieth century.

The effects of climate change on teleosts could be powerful but are complex. For example, increased winter precipitation (rain and snow) could harm populations of freshwater fish in Norway, whereas warmer summers could increase growth of adult fish. In the oceans, teleosts may be able to cope with warming, as it is simply an extension of natural variation in climate. It is uncertain how ocean acidification, caused by rising carbon dioxide levels, might affect teleosts.

=== Other interactions ===
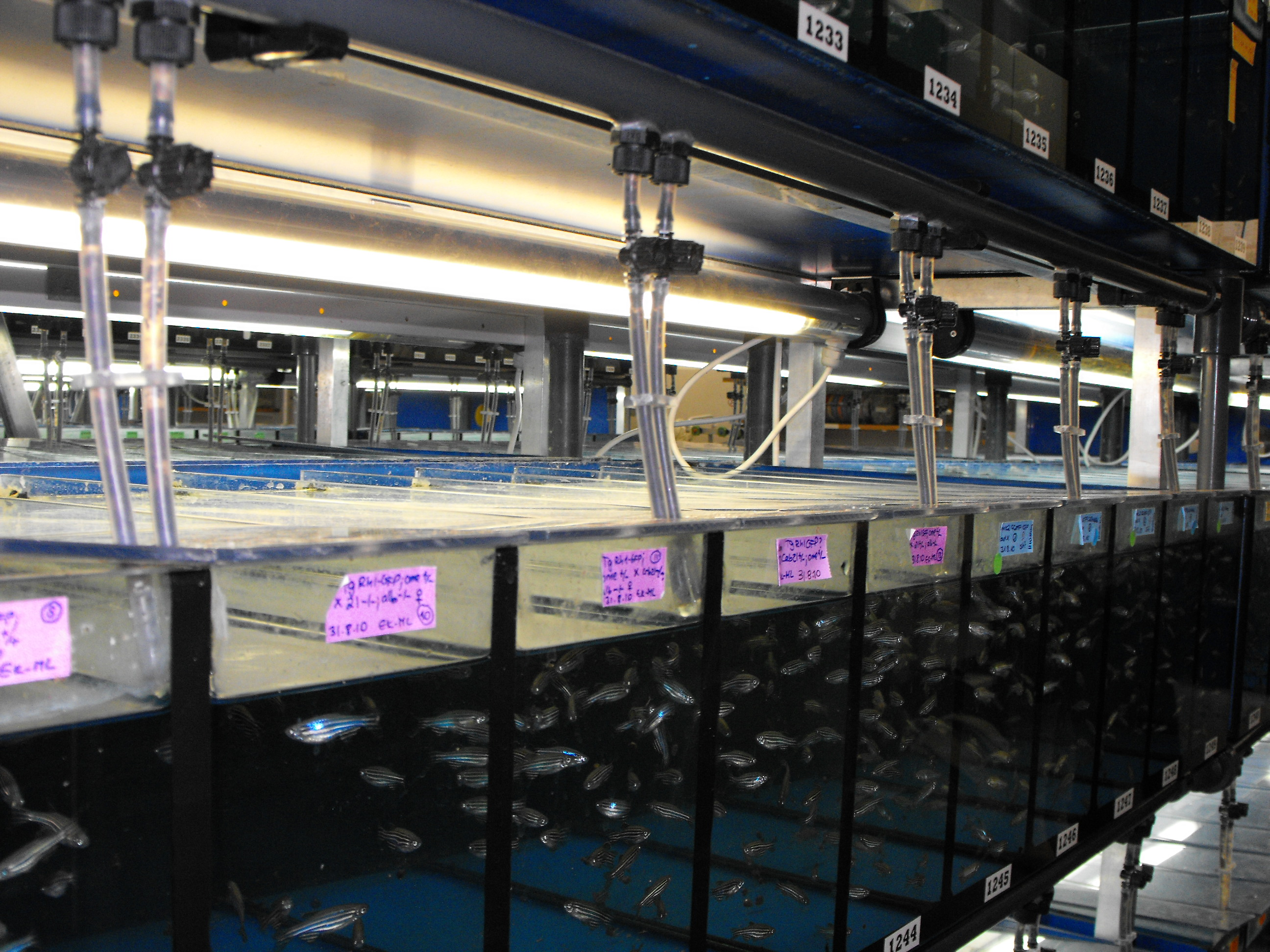
Service to science: zebrafish being bred in a research institute

A few teleosts are dangerous. Some, like eeltail catfish (Plotosidae), scorpionfish (Scorpaenidae) or stonefish (Synanceiidae) have venomous spines that can seriously injure or kill humans. Some, like the electric eel and the electric catfish, can give a severe electric shock. Others, such as the piranha and barracuda, have a powerful bite and have sometimes attacked human bathers. Reports indicate that some of the catfish family can be large enough to prey on human bathers.

Medaka and zebrafish are used as research models for studies in genetics and developmental biology. The zebrafish is the most commonly used laboratory vertebrate, offering the advantages of genetic similarity to mammals, small size, simple environmental needs, transparent larvae permitting non-invasive imaging, plentiful offspring, rapid growth, and the ability to absorb mutagens added to their water.

=== In art ===
Teleost fishes have been frequent subjects in art, reflecting their economic importance, for at least 14,000 years. They were commonly worked into patterns in Ancient Egypt, acquiring mythological significance in Ancient Greece and Rome, and from there into Christianity as a religious symbol; artists in China and Japan similarly use fish images symbolically. Teleosts became common in Renaissance art, with still life paintings reaching a peak of popularity in the Netherlands in the 17th century. In the 20th century, different artists such as Klee, Magritte, Matisse and Picasso used representations of teleosts to express radically different themes, from attractive to violent. The zoologist and artist Ernst Haeckel painted teleosts and other animals in his 1904 Kunstformen der Natur. Haeckel had become convinced by Goethe and Alexander von Humboldt that by making accurate depictions of unfamiliar natural forms, such as from the deep oceans, he could not only discover "the laws of their origin and evolution but also to press into the secret parts of their beauty by sketching and painting".

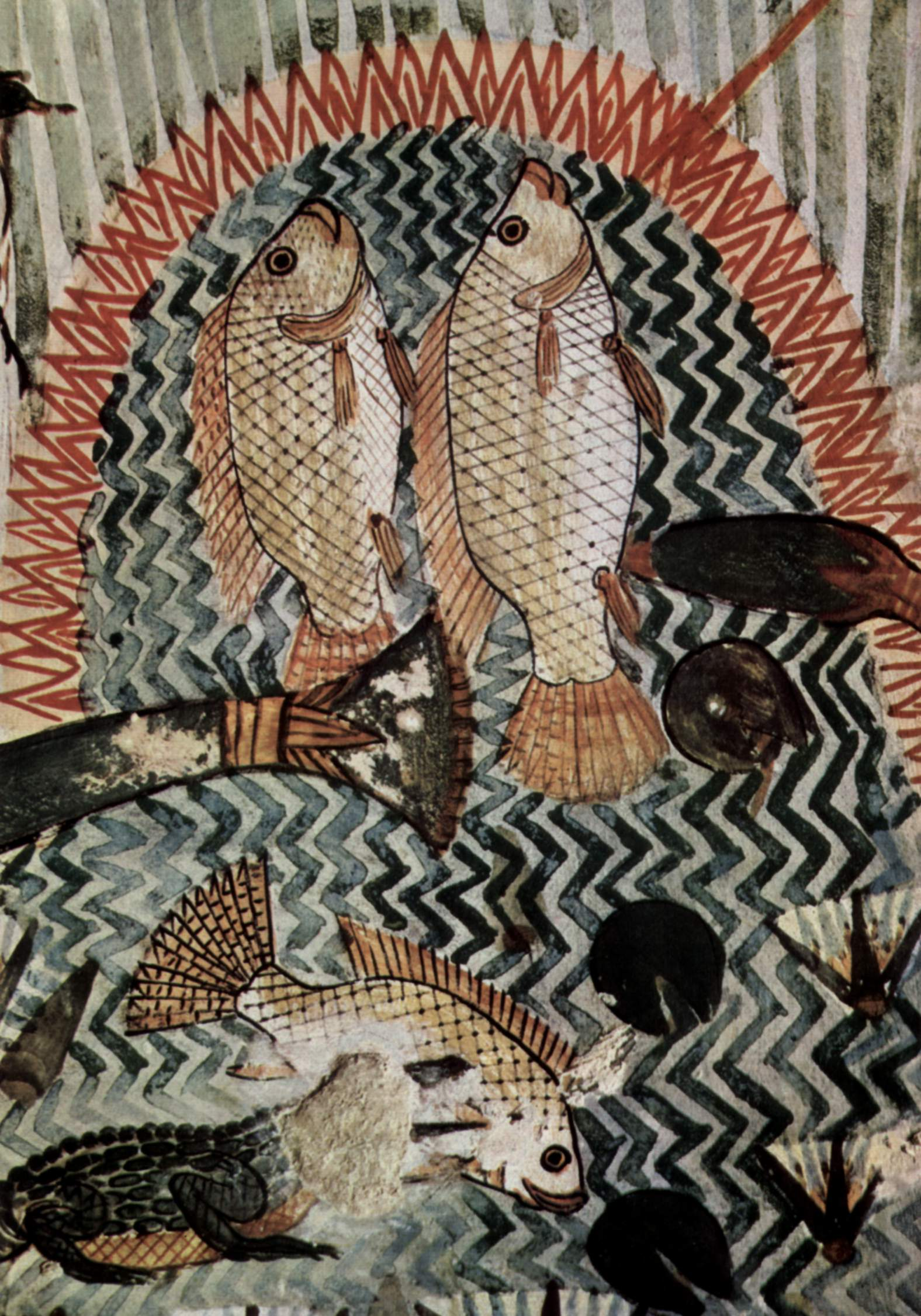
Wall painting of fishing, Tomb of Menna the scribe, Thebes, Ancient Egypt, c. 1422–1411 BC

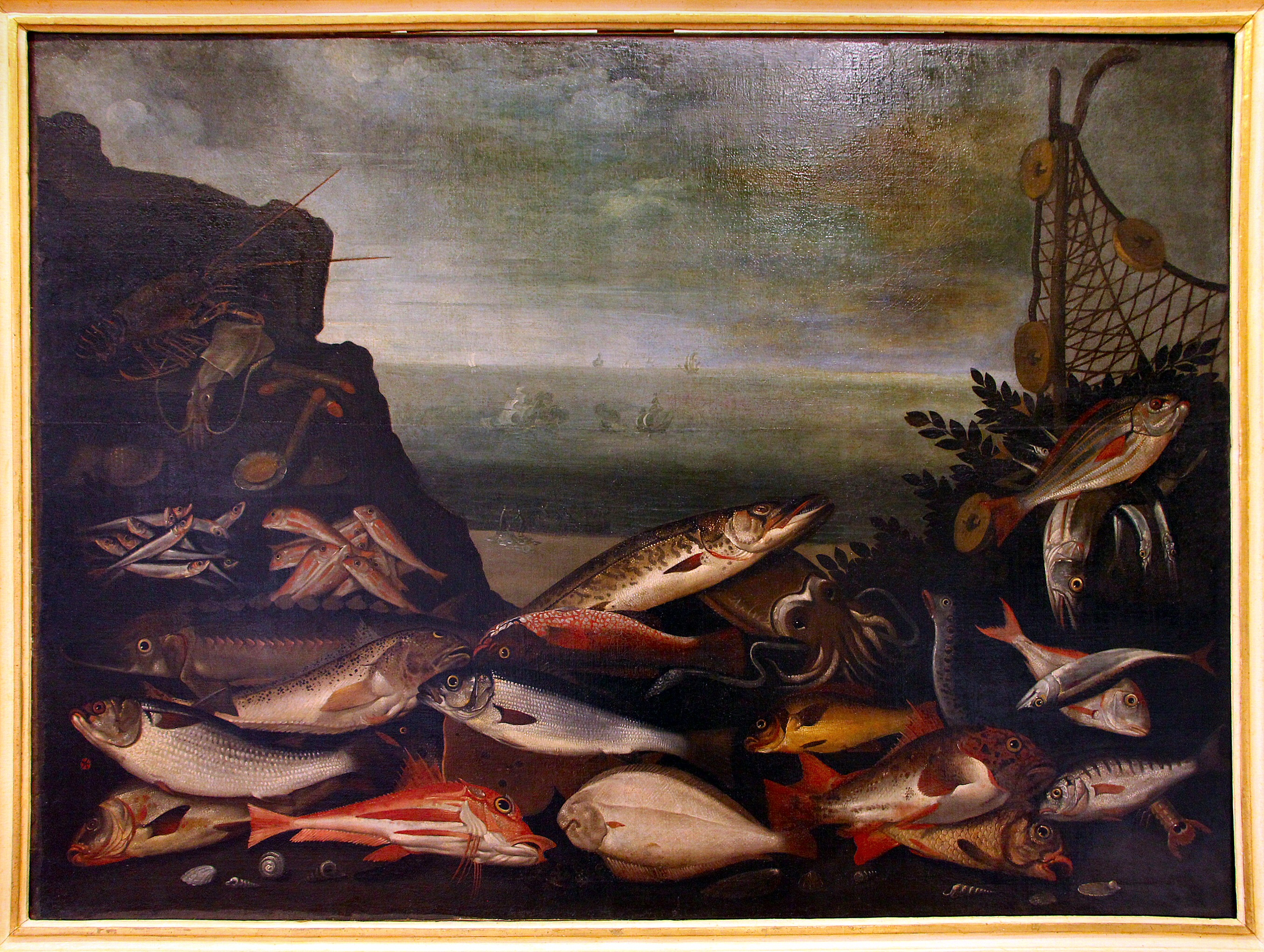
Italian Renaissance: Fish, Antonio Tanari, c. 1610–1630, in the Medici Villa, Poggio a Caiano

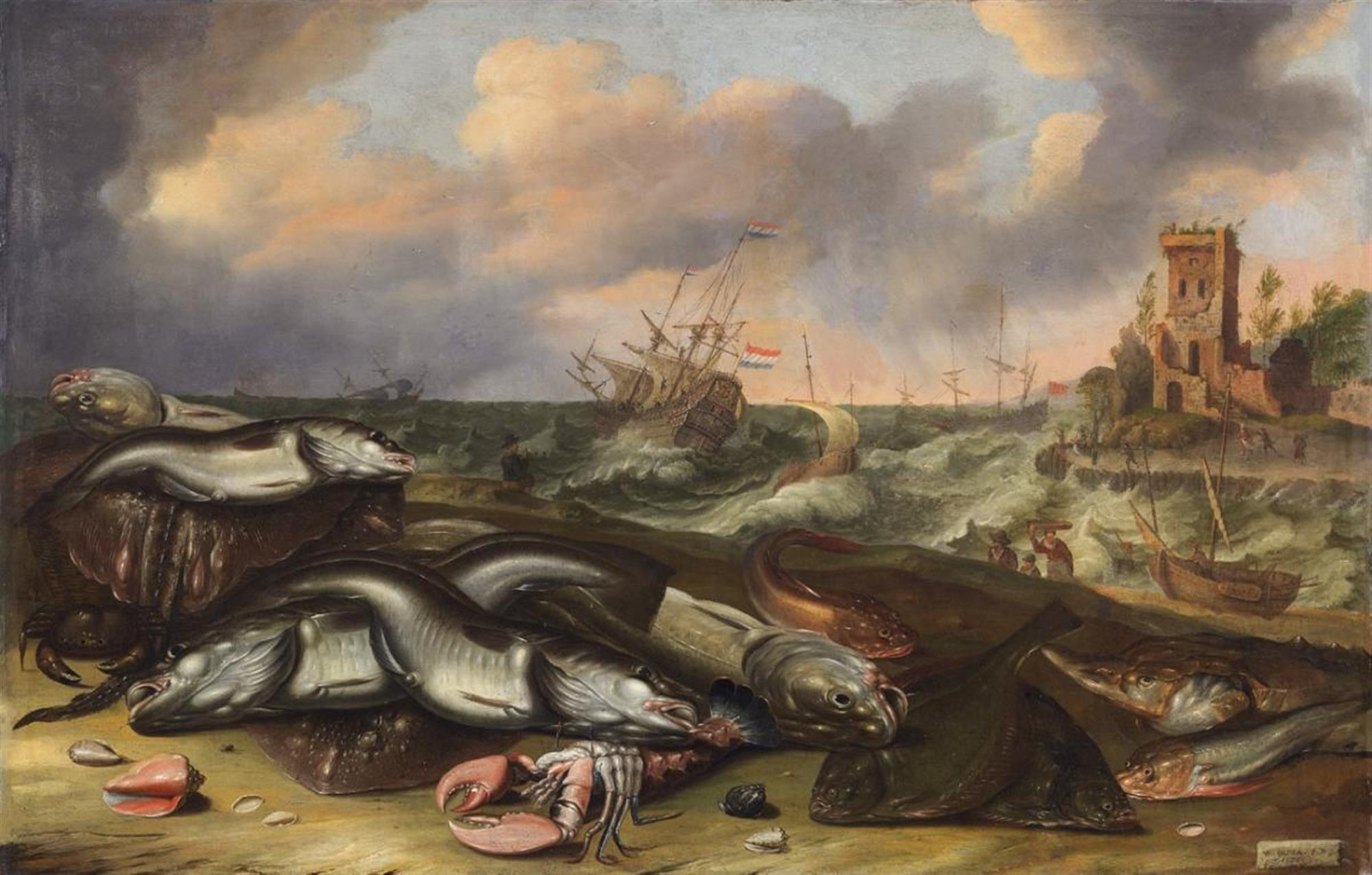
Dutch Golden Age painting: Fish Still Life with Stormy Seas, Willem Ormea and Abraham Willaerts, 1636

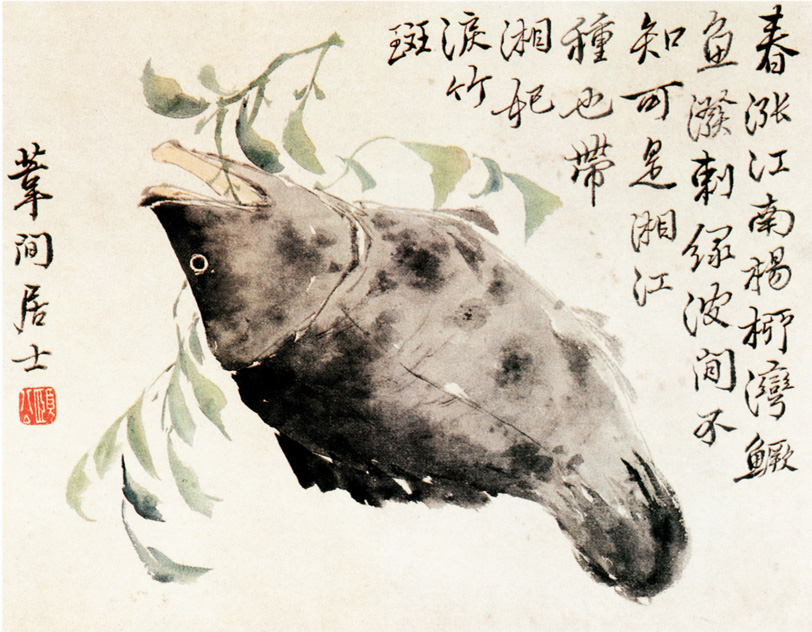
Mandarin Fish by Bian Shoumin, Qing dynasty, 18th century

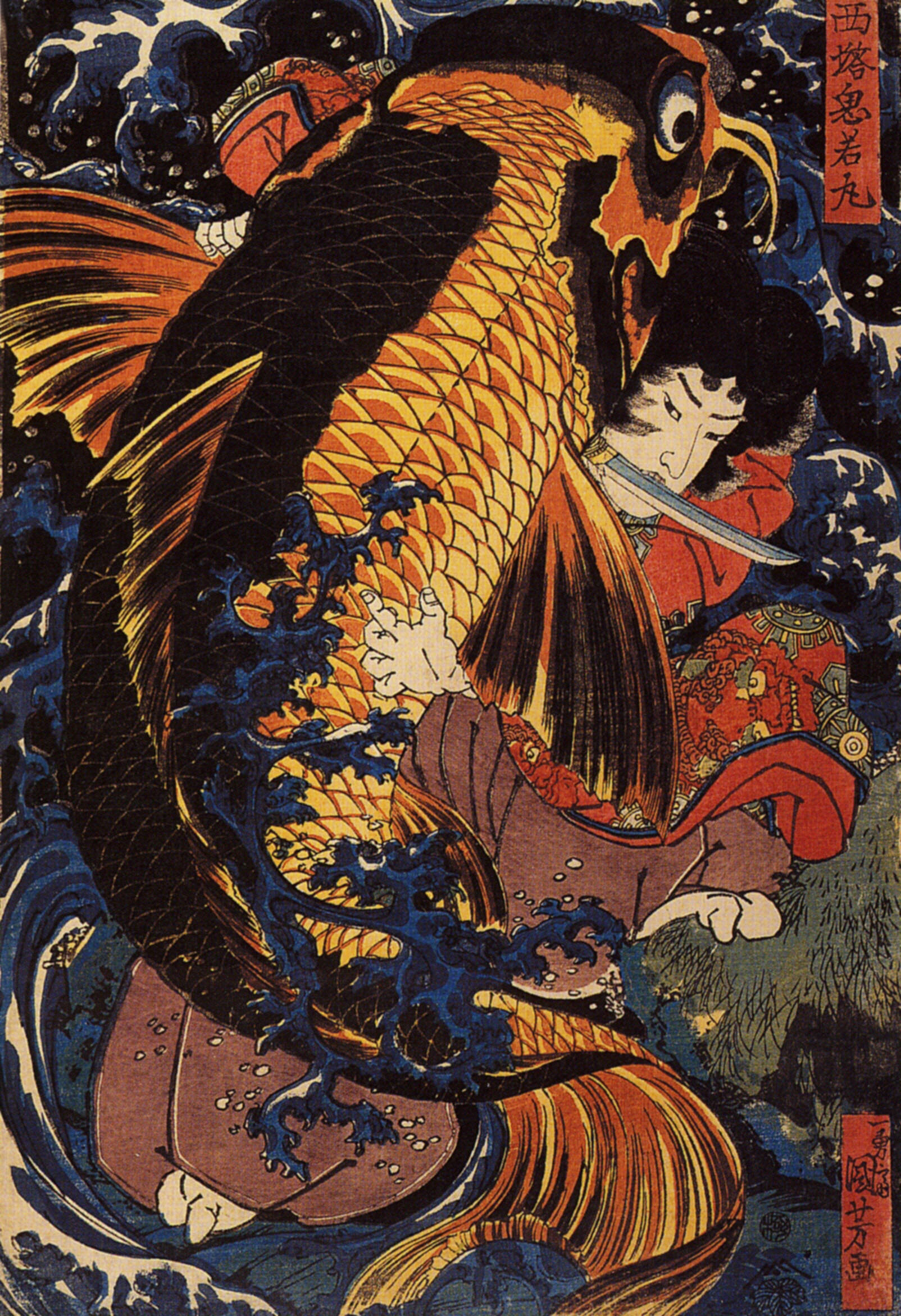
Saito Oniwakamaru fights a giant carp at the Bishimon waterfall by Utagawa Kuniyoshi, 19th century

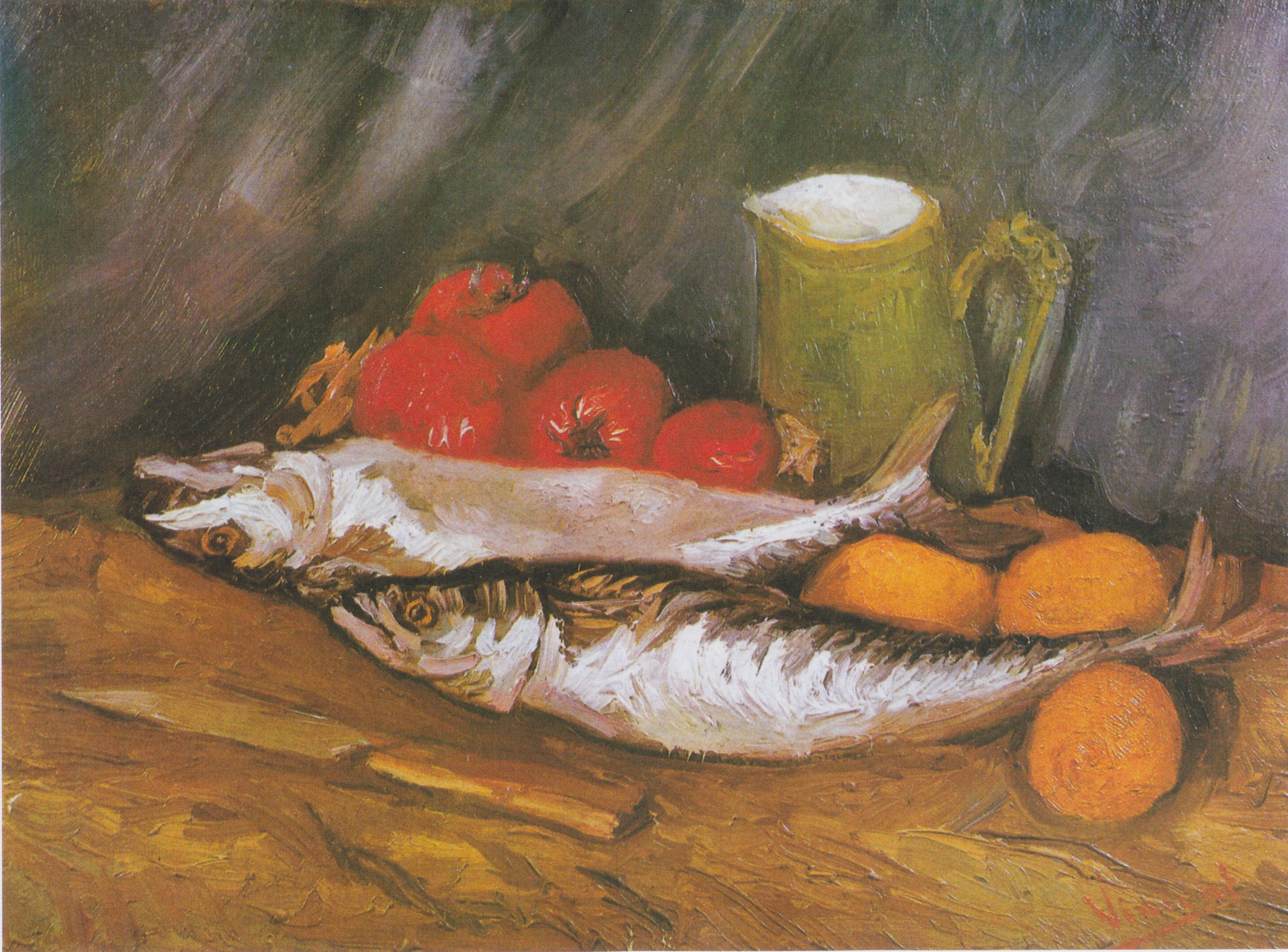
Still Life with Mackerel, Lemons and Tomato, Vincent van Gogh, 1886

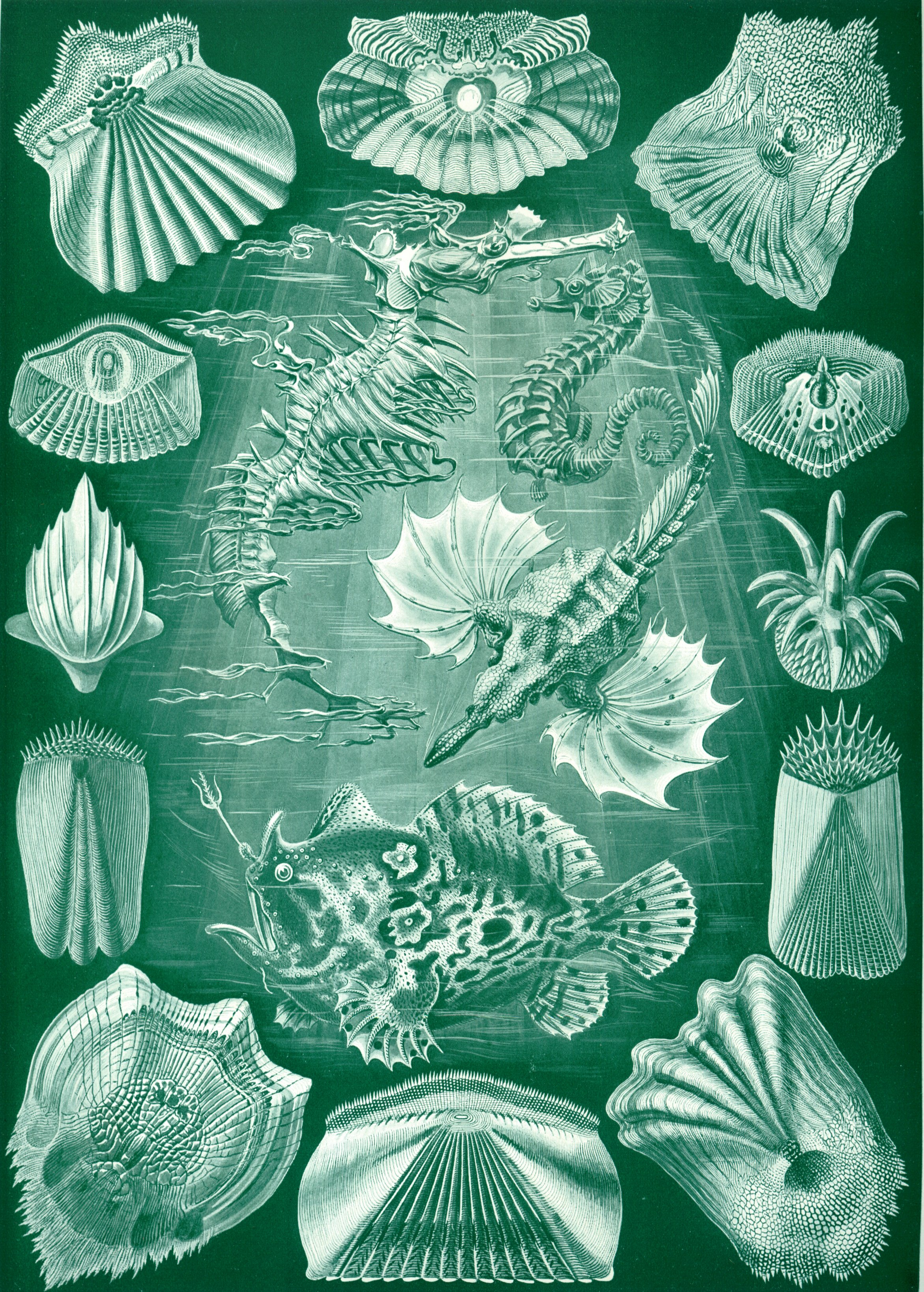
Teleostei by Ernst Haeckel, 1904. Four species, surrounded by scales

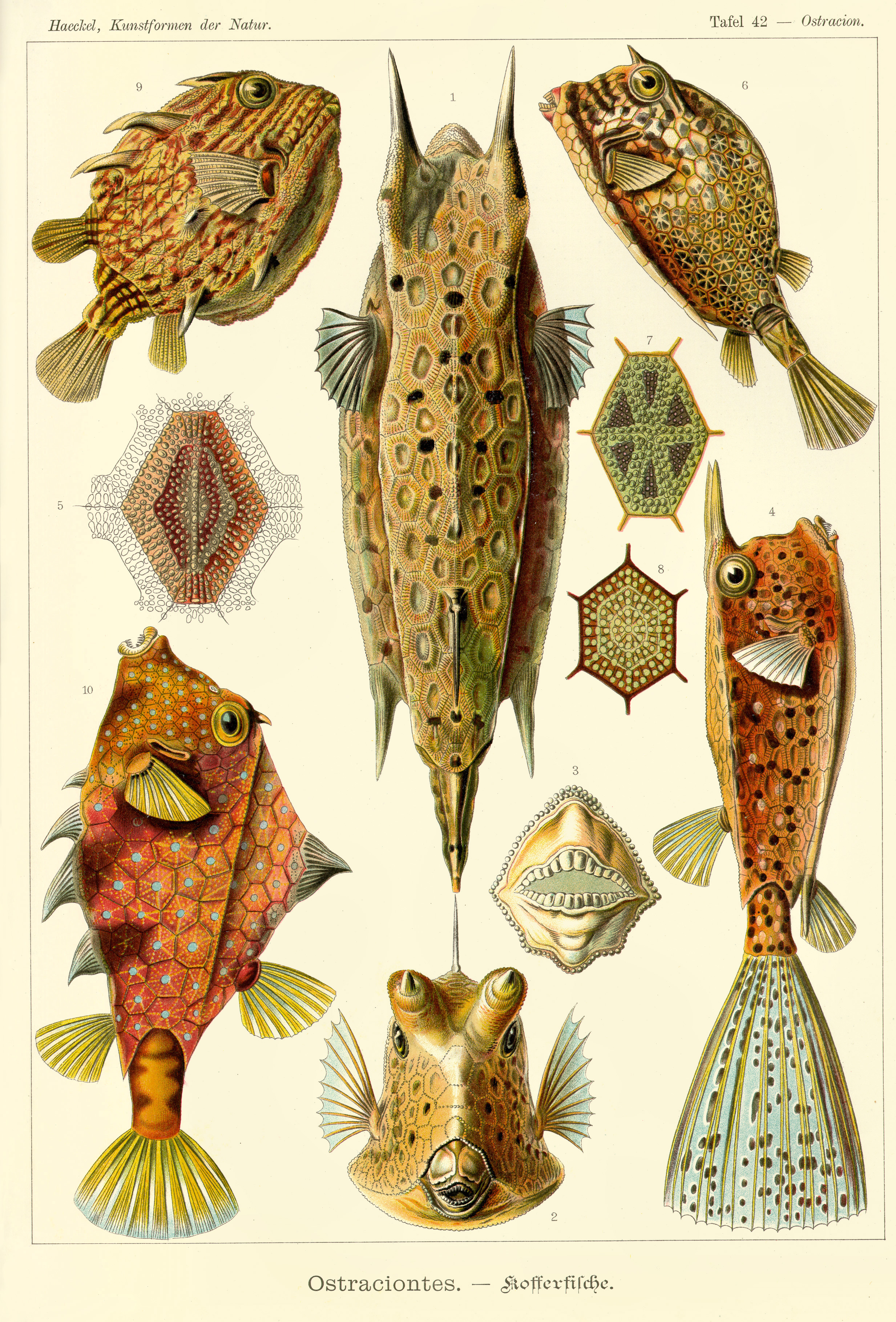
Ostraciontes by Ernst Haeckel, 1904. Ten teleosts, with Lactoria cornuta in centre.

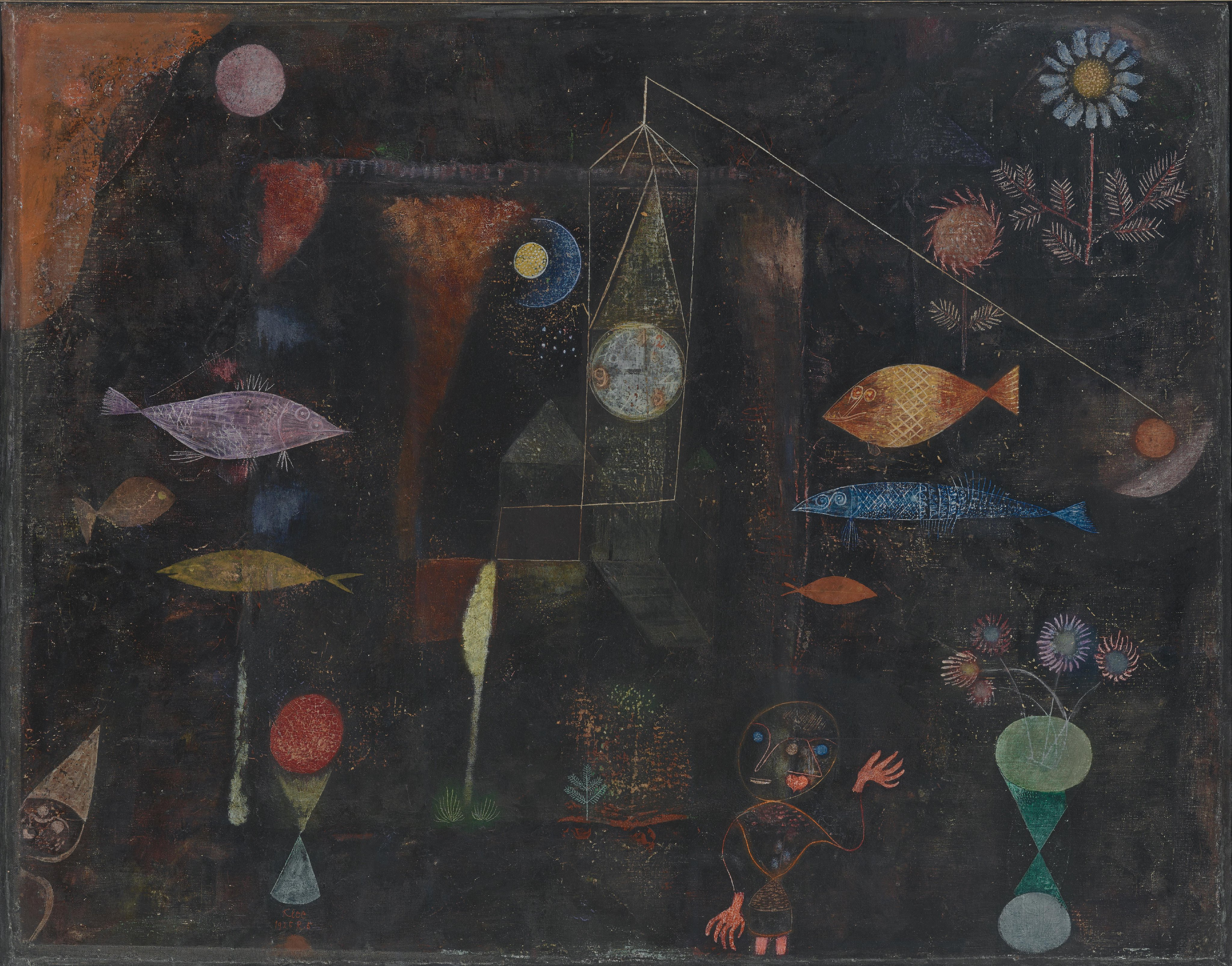
Fish Magic, Paul Klee, oil and watercolour varnished, 1925
