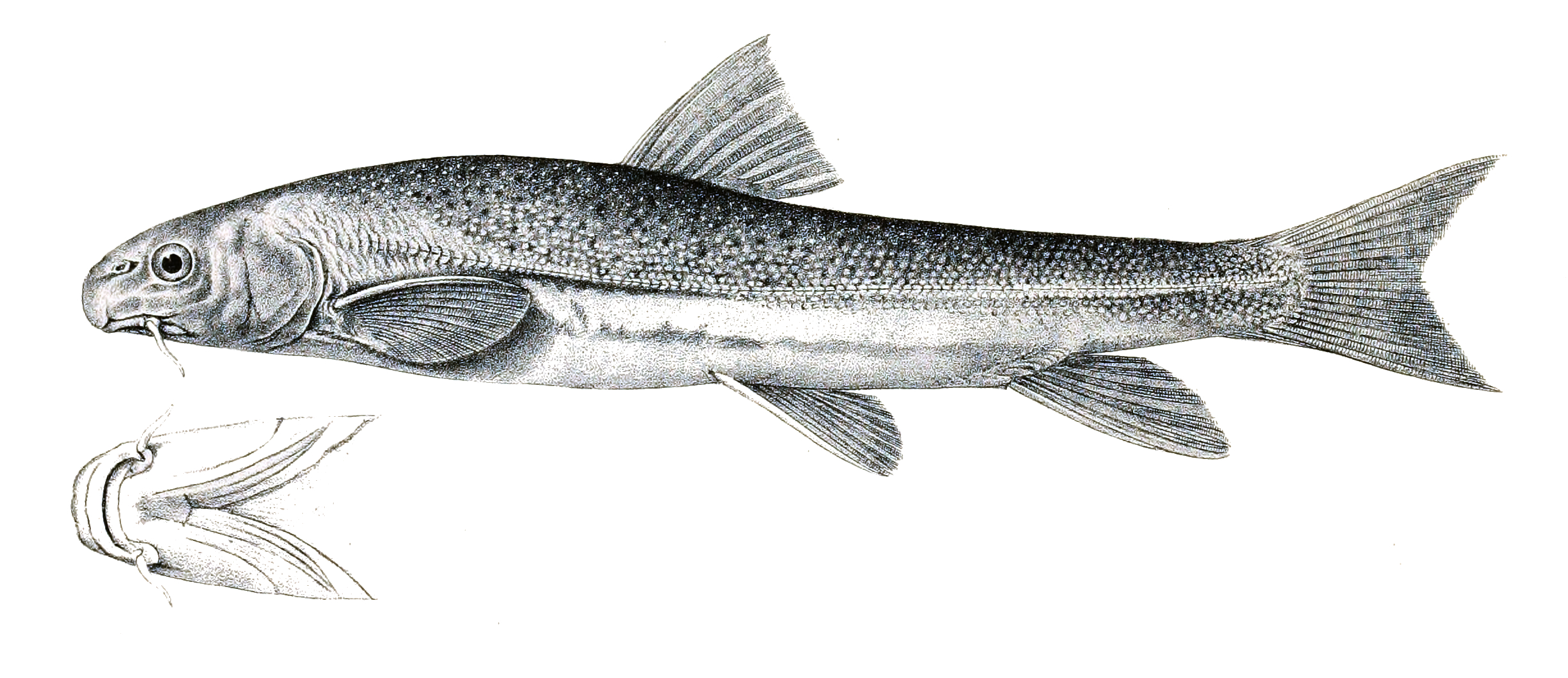

Conservation status
- Least Concern (IUCN 3.1)

Scientific classification
- Kingdom: Animalia
- Phylum: Chordata
- Class: Actinopterygii
- Division: Teleostei
- Order: Cypriniformes
- Family: Cyprinidae
- Subfamily: Schizopygopsinae
- Genus: Diptychus
- Species: D. maculatus

Binomial name
- Diptychus maculatus Steindachner, 1866

Synonyms
- Diptychus gymnogaster Kessler, 1879; Ptychobarbus oschanini Berg, 1905; Diptychus pakistanicus Mirza & Awan, 1979

= Scaly osman =

Species of fish

The scaly osman (Diptychus maculatus) is a species of cyprinid freshwater fish. It is native to Himalaya and the Tibetan Plateau of China, India, Nepal and Pakistan, ranging west to the Tien Shan Mountains and Central Asia. It is up to 70 cm (2 ft 4 in) in total length.

== Genomics ==
The first chromosome-level genome assembly of Diptychus maculatus was published in 2026. The genome is approximately 1.79 Gb in size, with 90.68% of the assembly anchored into 49 pseudo-chromosomes. The assembly has a BUSCO completeness score of 99.3%, and 60,481 protein-coding genes were predicted.
