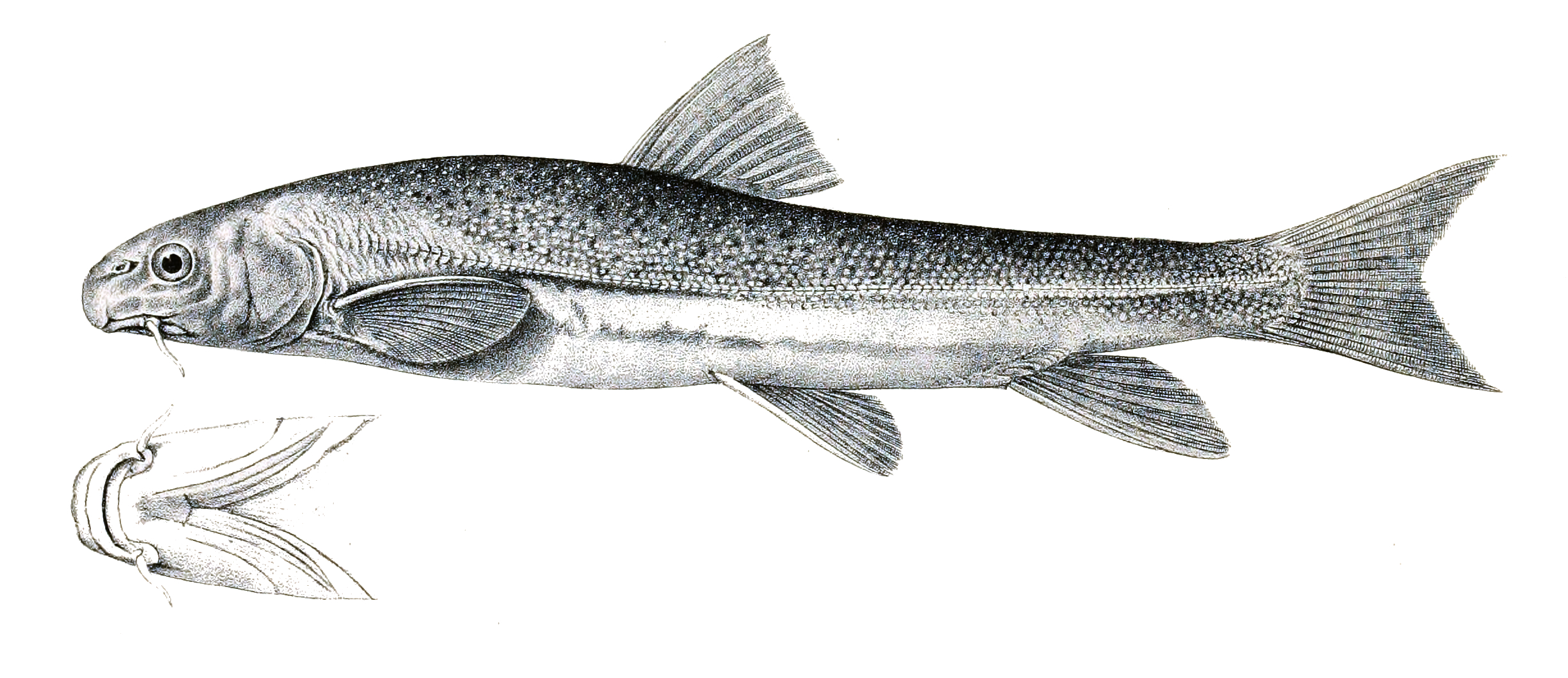
- Diptychus maculatus

Scientific classification
- Kingdom: Animalia
- Phylum: Chordata
- Class: Actinopterygii
- Order: Cypriniformes
- Family: Cyprinidae
- Subfamily: Schizopygopsinae
- Genus: Diptychus; Steindachner, 1866

Type species
- Diptychus maculatus Steindachner, 1866

Species
- See list

= Diptychus =

Genus of fishes

Diptychus is a genus of freshwater ray-finned fish belonging to the family Cyprinidae, the family which includes the carps, barbs and related fishes. This genus is classified within the subfamily Schizopygopsinae, the mountain barbels. The two species in this genus are found in Himalaya and the Tibetan Plateau of China, India, Nepal and Pakistan, ranging west to the Tien Shan Mountains and Central Asia. The type species is the scaly osman, Diptychus maculatus. The name is derived from the Greek word di, meaning "two", and the Greek word ptyx, meaning "fold". Diptychus is up to 70 cm (2.3 ft) in total length.

== Species ==
There are two recognized species in this genus:

- Diptychus maculatus Steindachner, 1866 (Scaly osman)
- Diptychus sewerzowi Kessler, 1872
