= Yongning =

Yongning (simplified Chinese: 永宁; traditional Chinese: 永寧 unless otherwise noted) may refer to:

== Places in China ==
- Yongning County, Ningxia
- Yongning District (邕宁区), Nanning, Guangxi

=== Subdistricts ===
- Yongning Subdistrict, Guangzhou, in Zengcheng District, Guangzhou, Guangdong
- Yongning Subdistrict, Nanjing, in Pukou District, Nanjing, Jiangsu
- Yongning Subdistrict, Yitong County, in Yitong County, Jilin
- Yongning Subdistrict, Luzhou, in Naxi District, Luzhou, Sichuan

=== Towns ===
- Yongning, Beijing, in Yanqing District, Beijing
- Yongning, Fujian, in Shishi, Fujian
- Yongning, Hui County, in Hui County, Gansu
- Yongning, Zhuanglang County, in Zhuanglang County, Gansu
- Yongning, Yangchun, in Yangchun, Guangdong
- Yongning, Guizhou, in Guanling Buyei and Miao Autonomous County, Guizhou
- Yongning, Jiangxi, in Tonggu County, Jiangxi
- Yongning, Liaoning, in Wafangdian, Liaoning
- Yongning, Shaanxi, in Zhidan County, Shaanxi
- Yongning, Cangxi County, in Cangxi County, Sichuan
- Yongning, Wenjiang District, in Wenjiang District, Chengdu, Sichuan
- Yongning, Xinjiang, in Yanqi Hui Autonomous County, Xinjiang

=== Townships ===
- Yongning Township, Chengdu, in Jianyang, Sichuan
- Yongning Township, Wanyuan, in Wanyuan, Sichuan
- Yongning Township, Honghe Prefecture, in Luxi County, Yunnan
- Yongning Township, Ninglang County, in Ninglang Yi Autonomous County, Yunnan
- Yongning, Ankang

== Historical eras ==
- Yongning (120–121), era name used by Emperor An of Han
- Yongning (301–302), era name used by Emperor Hui of Jin
- Yongning (350–351), era name used by Shi Zhi, emperor of Later Zhao

== See also ==
- Yongning Station, a station on the Tucheng Line of the Taipei Rapid Transit System in Taipei, Taiwan
