= Yitong =

Yitong may refer to:

- Yitong Manchu Autonomous County, in Jilin, China
- Yitong Town, county seat of Yitong County, Jilin, China
- Yitong River, in Jilin, China
- Yitong Law Firm, in the People's Republic of China engaged in defense of human rights
- Manchu chess, also known as Yitong.
