= Schizothorax labrosus =

Conservation status
- Critically Endangered (IUCN 3.1)

Scientific classification
- Kingdom: Animalia
- Phylum: Chordata
- Class: Actinopterygii
- Order: Cypriniformes
- Family: Cyprinidae
- Subfamily: Schizothoracinae
- Genus: Schizothorax
- Species: S. labrosus

Binomial name
- Schizothorax labrosus Y. H. Wang, D. D. Zhuang & L. C. Gao, 1981

Synonyms
- Racoma labrosa (Wang, Zhuang & Gao, 1981)

Species of fish

Schizothorax labrosus is a species of ray-finned fish in the genus Schizothorax from Lugu Lake in Ninglang, Yunnan.
