= Lugu Lake =

Lake in northwest of Yunnan plateau

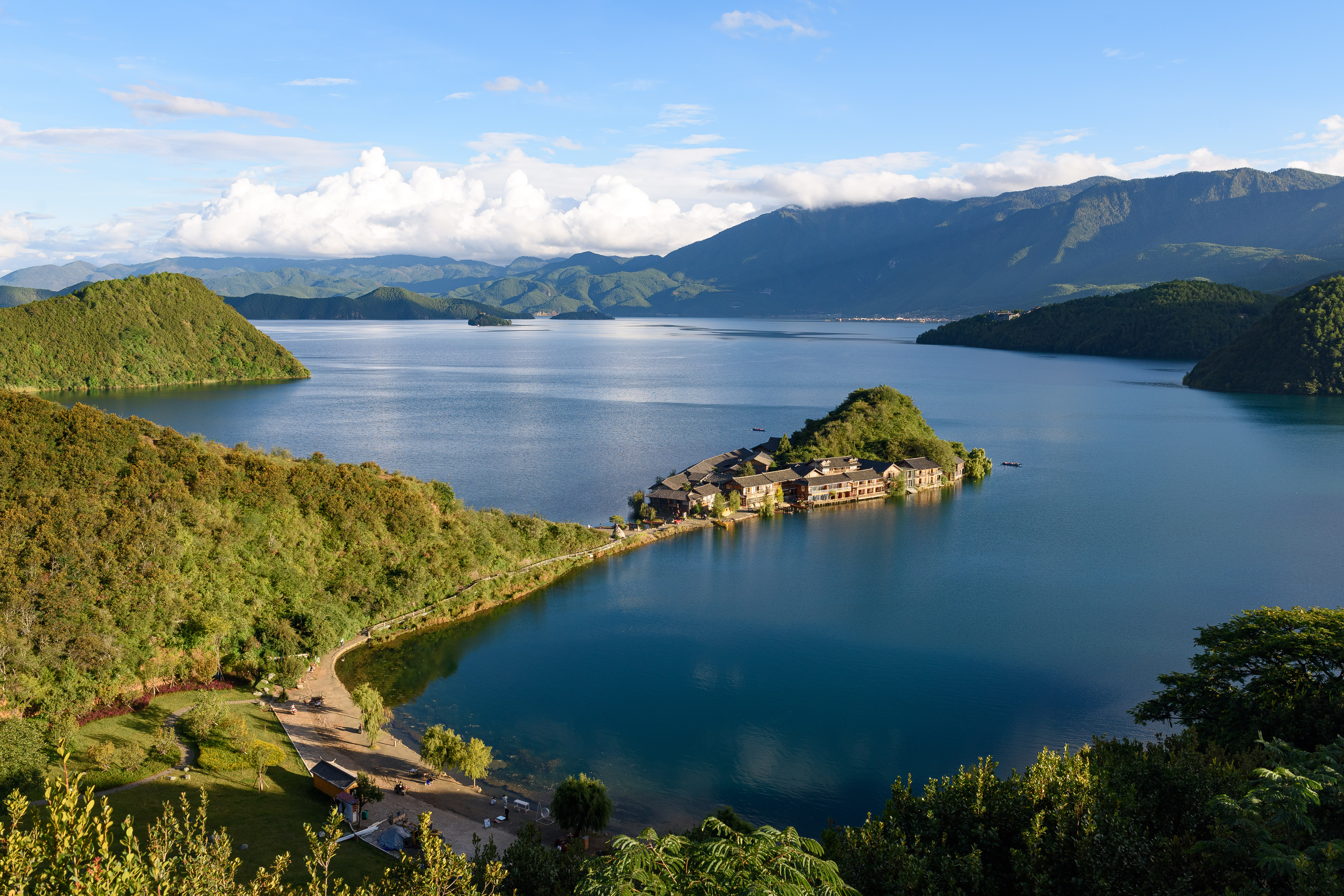
- Lugu Lake's Lige

- Location in Sichuan Location in Yunnan Lugu Lake (China)
- Location: Yanyuan County, Sichuan; Ninglang Yi Autonomous County, Yunnan
- Coordinates: 27.7°N 100.8°E
- Primary inflows: Mosuo River
- Primary outflows: Gaizu River (seasonal) joining Yalong River
- Catchment area: 171.4 square kilometres (66.2 sq mi)
- Basin countries: China
- Max. length: 9.4 kilometres (5.8 mi)
- Max. width: 5.2 kilometres (3.2 mi) (average)
- Surface area: 48.5 square kilometres (18.7 sq mi)
- Max. depth: 93.5 metres (307 ft)
- Residence time: 18 years
- Surface elevation: 2,685 metres (8,809 ft)
- Islands: Five

Lugu Lake (simplified Chinese: 泸沽湖; traditional Chinese: 瀘沽湖; pinyin: Lúgū Hú) is located in the northwest of the Yunnan plateau, with the middle of the lake forming the border between the Ninglang County of Yunnan Province and the Yanyuan County of Sichuan Province. The formation of the lake is thought to have occurred in a geological fault belonging to the geological age of the Late Cenozoic. It is an alpine lake at an elevation of 2,685 metres (8,809 ft) and is the highest lake in the Yunnan Province. The lake is surrounded by mountains and has five islands, four peninsulas, fourteen bays and seventeen beaches.

The lake's shores are inhabited by many minority ethnic groups, such as the Mosuo, Norzu, Yi, and Pumi. The most numerous of these are the Mosuo people (also spelt "Moso"), said to be a sub clan of the Naxi people (as per Chinese records of Minorities in China) with ancient family structure considered as "a live fossil for researching the marital development history of Human beings" and "the last quaint Realm of Matriarchy." It is considered as the home of the Moso Tribe However, Mosuo have a separate identity from the Naxis, as it is said that the Chinese used the word Mosuo as a generic term for different ethnic groups, including the Naxi.

Lugu Lake is called the "mother lake" by the Mosuo people. The lake is also well known in Chinese travel pamphlets as the region of "Amazons," "The Kingdom of Women" and "Home of the Matriarchal Tribe", this last name highlighting the dominant role of the Mosuo women in their society. The marriage rites of the Mosuo people are known as "azhu marriage" ceremony and this unique aspect of their social culture has given the title "exotic land of daughters" to the area. It is also known as "A Quaint Realm of Matriarchy." The matriarchal and matrilineal society of the Mosuos is also termed the "Women's World."

== Etymology ==
In the Mosuo language, Lugu means "falling into the water" and hu means "lake" in Chinese, which combined give the name of the lake.

== Geography ==
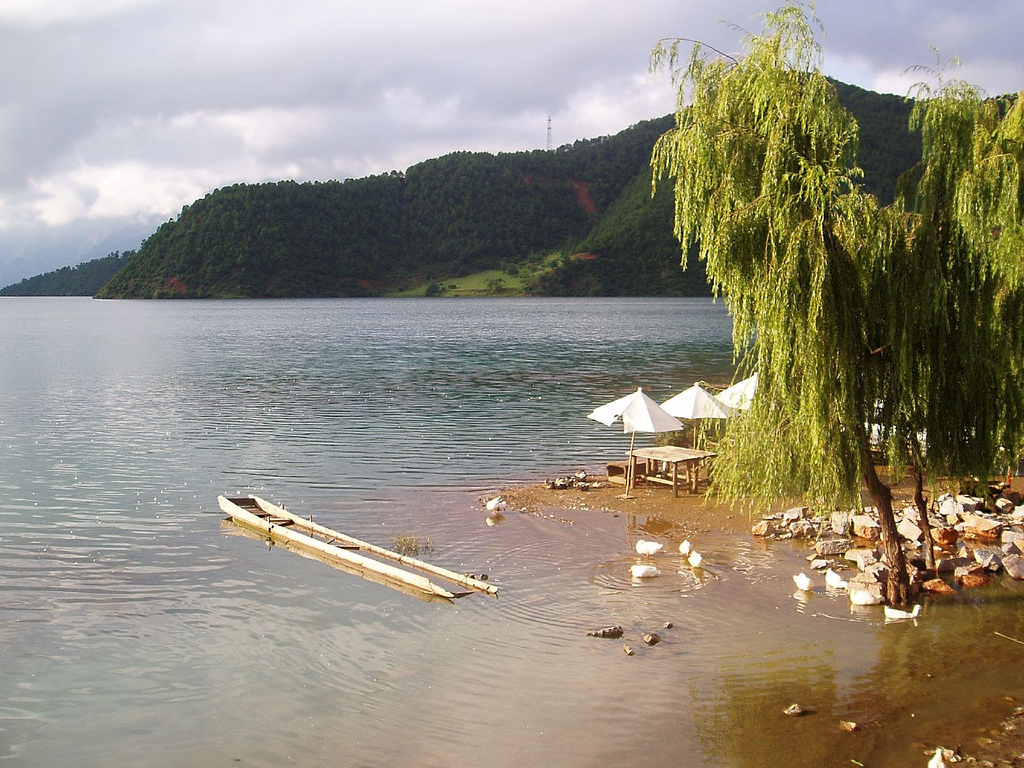
Lugu Lake in the morning

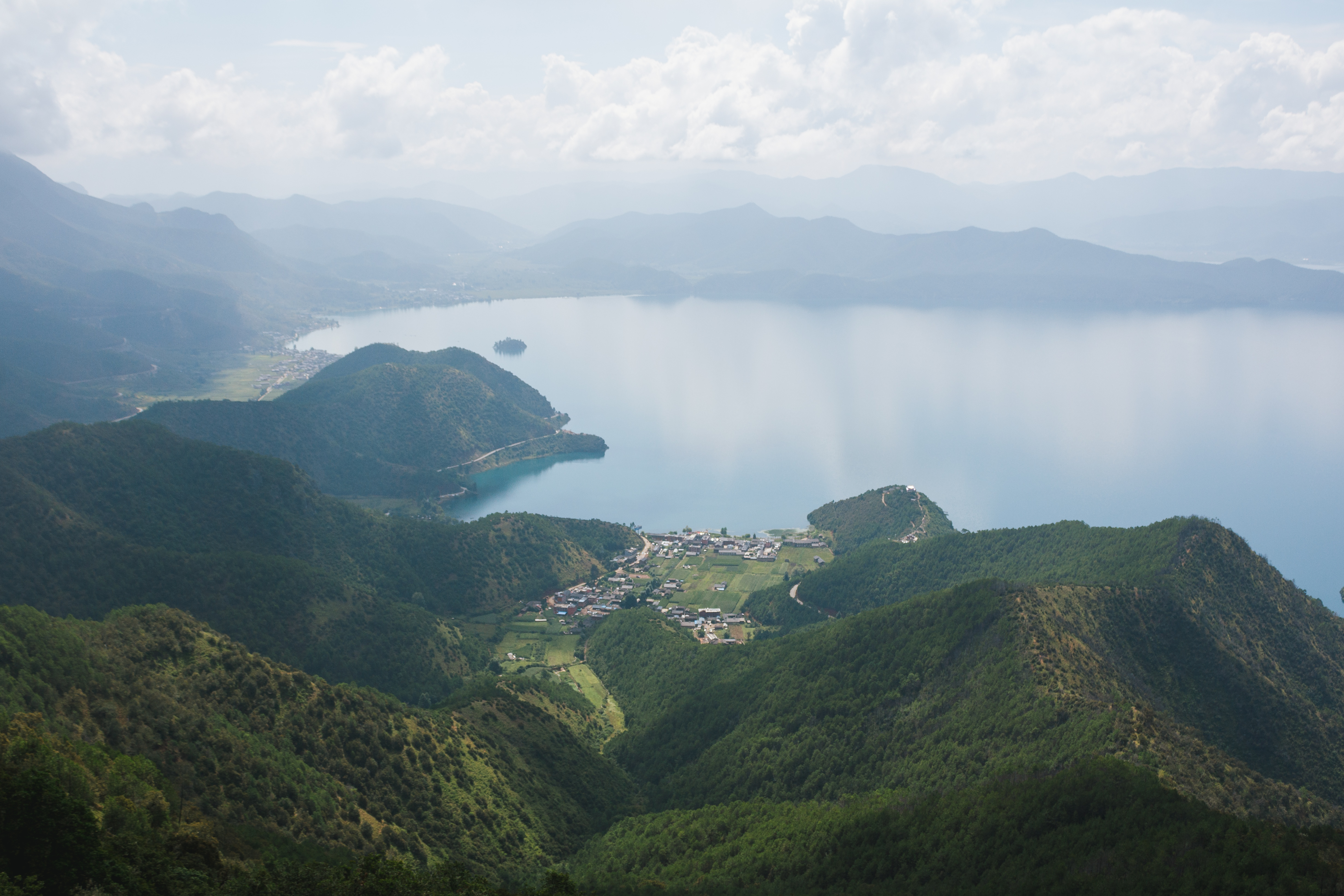
A view of Lugu Lake from a nearby cable car

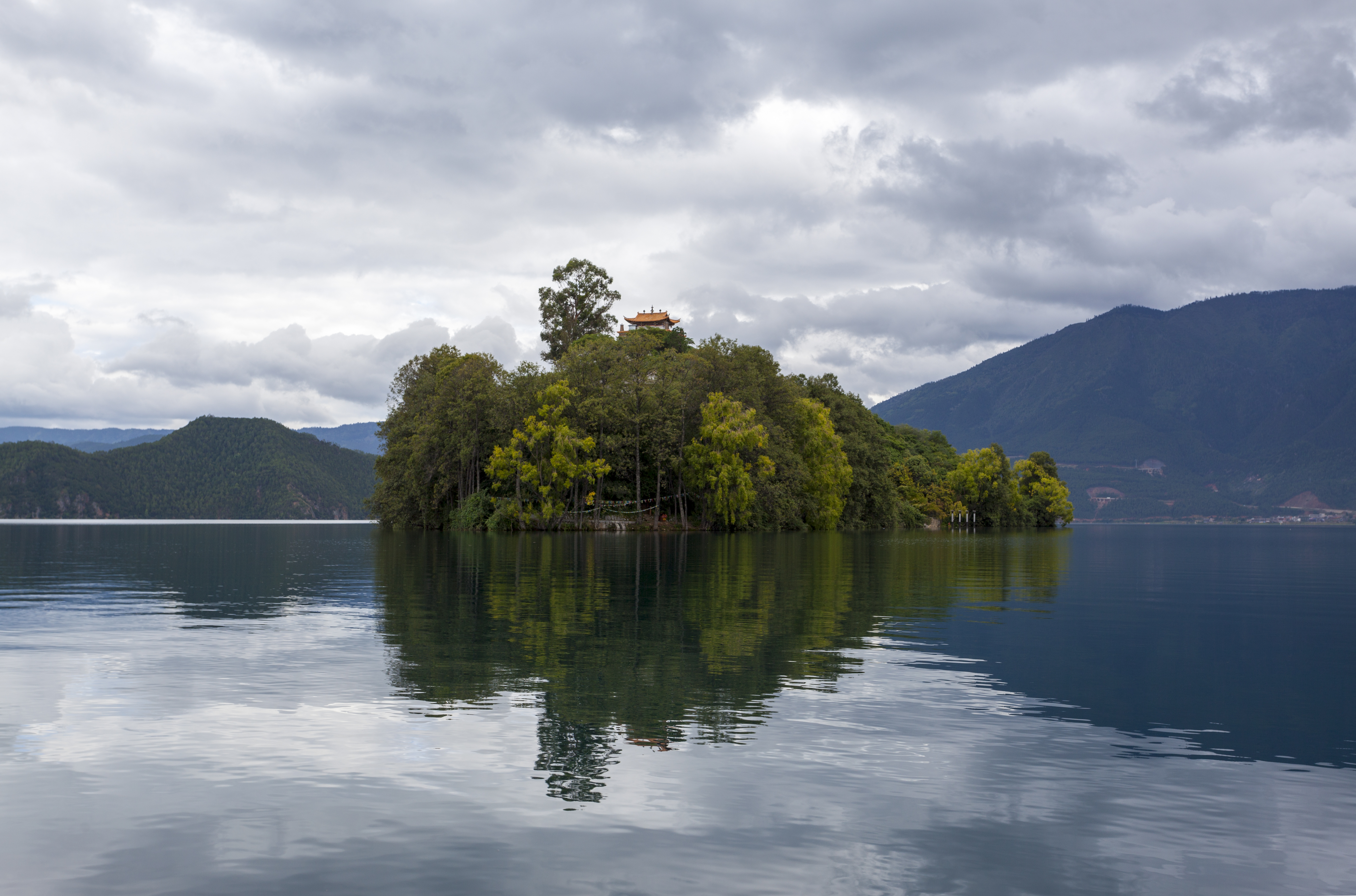
The island on which Joseph Rock lived

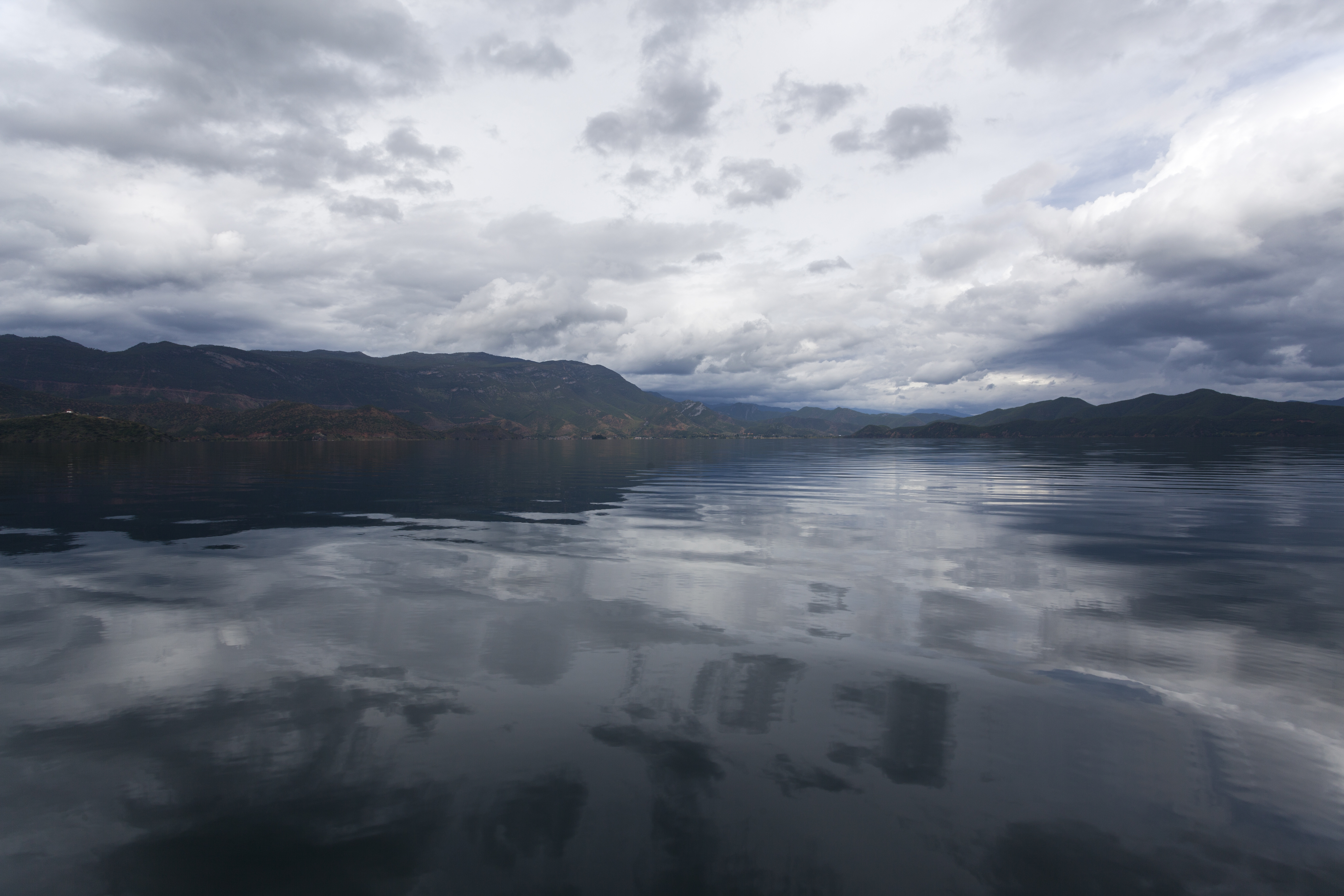
From a boat on Lugu lake

Lugu Lake is a natural lake in the Hengduan Mountain System, and has a horseshoe shape. It is bounded within geographic coordinates of 27.683°N 100.75°E and 27.75°N 100.833°E. It is located in a high plateau amidst the Xiaoliangshan hills of Western Yunnan. The Lion Mountain that surrounds the lake, which is worshipped as the goddess Gammo, is the chief deity of the Mosuo people who inhabit the area. The lake has a drainage catchment of 171.4 square kilometres (66.2 sq mi). The lake's main storage is from rainfall and its waters display a turquoise blue colour. The south shoreline of the lake is located in Yi Autonomous region of Ningland. The lake has a length of 9.4 kilometres (5.8 mi) with a width of 8 kilometres (5.0 mi) (mean width is 5.2 kilometres (3.2 mi)) and a water spread area of 50 square kilometres (19 mi^{2}) (48.5 square kilometres (18.7 mi^{2}) is also mentioned) and an average depth of 45 metres (148 ft). The maximum depth in the lake is reported at 93.5 metres (307 ft) (90 metres (300 ft) is also mentioned in some references) which makes it the second deepest lake in China, after the Fuxianhu Lake. Lugu Lake is hemmed on both sides by steep mountains and partially forested slopes; it is fed by the Mosuo River and drained by the Gaizu River, which joins the Yalong River and eventually merges into the Jingshajiang River or the Yangtze River. Geologically, it is inferred as one of the youngest fault lakes in the Yunnan Plateau.

The Gaizu River, flowing out of the lake at its southeast end, has a controlled outlet that is only operated during the rainy season and remains closed from September to May. Lugu Lake is snowbound for three months a year; in the autumn and spring, it has a cool and dry climate with warm daytime temperatures.

Its waters exhibit transparency to a depth of 11 metres (36 ft) and the lake itself has four prominent peninsulas and five islands. The five islands are: Heiwawu Island in the centre of the lake is inhabited by a variety of birds, Liwubi Island, Lige Island, Nixi Island (the smallest island, which is an oblong-shaped rock covered with shrubs and moss), and Lama Island. Three peninsulas and an island are linked to a seawall on the shore by a stone-paved path.

The winding shoreline of the lake is occupied by several ethnic minorities belonging to the Mosuo, Norzu, Yi, and Pumi tribes. Villages on the shore include Luoshui and Lige, which are tourist centres. Thus many beaches have been developed, which have become tourist attractions. A walking tour along the periphery of the lake is a common way of viewing the lake and its precincts.

Until 1982 there were no roads to the lake. The lake is 200 kilometres (120 mi) away from the Lijiang city, the headquarters of the Ninglang province, along a road that passes through some of the most scenic sights en route between Zhongdian and Dequin. The road, however, is affected by bad weather. The village roadhead on the shores of the lake that is connected with Lijiang city is known as Luoshui, a village, part of a larger Luoshui Administrative Village.

Luoshui village on the Yunnan side and Mukua village on the Sichuan side of the lake can be approached by canoes via the Lama Island. The canoes are known as "zhucaochuan" in the local language, which means the "pig-trough boats". The trek route, which is popular among Buddhist pilgrims, starts at Luoshoi and also ends there. Buddhism is prevalent around the lake, as the shores of the lake have Tibetan-type monasteries, mostly of the Gelugpa Order, established by the people who have settled around the lake; the important monasteries on the shore are: The Daming Gonpa or Yradzong Gonpa, Shubi Gonpa, Ozer Gonpa, Galong Gonpa and the Dzembu Monastery, the last named belongs to the Sakya Order.

The history of the place, however, is also well known for its matriarchal culture and also the dress of the Mosuo women and girls in particular, which is distinctly conspicuous for its maroon blouses and skirts that establish an aura of authority.

== Climate ==
Climate data for Lugu Lake
Month	Jan	Feb	Mar	Apr	May	Jun	Jul	Aug	Sep	Oct	Nov	Dec	Year
Mean daily maximum °C (°F)	12.3 (54.1)	13.5 (56.3)	16.4 (61.5)	19.3 (66.7)	22.0 (71.6)	22.1 (71.8)	22.2 (72.0)	21.8 (71.2)	20.3 (68.5)	18.1 (64.6)	15.2 (59.4)	12.9 (55.2)	18.0 (64.4)
Daily mean °C (°F)	4.4 (39.9)	6.1 (43.0)	8.9 (48.0)	12.2 (54.0)	15.5 (59.9)	17.1 (62.8)	17.7 (63.9)	17.1 (62.8)	15.6 (60.1)	12.4 (54.3)	8.1 (46.6)	5.1 (41.2)	11.7 (53.0)
Mean daily minimum °C (°F)	−3.4 (25.9)	−1.3 (29.7)	1.5 (34.7)	5.1 (41.2)	9.0 (48.2)	12.1 (53.8)	13.2 (55.8)	12.4 (54.3)	10.9 (51.6)	6.8 (44.2)	1.0 (33.8)	−2.6 (27.3)	5.4 (41.7)
Average precipitation mm (inches)	3 (0.1)	6 (0.2)	13 (0.5)	26 (1.0)	64 (2.5)	176 (6.9)	219 (8.6)	177 (7.0)	143 (5.6)	64 (2.5)	12 (0.5)	4 (0.2)	907 (35.6)
Source: Climate-Data.org

== History ==
Kublai Khan, with his Mongolian army, established his army headquarters south of Lugu Lake. A feudal government ensued when officers and troops were stationed here. Kublai Khan introduced Buddhism and enforced rules of civil administration, coupled with religious tenets around Lugu Lake and Yongning. It was during this time that the practice of monogamous marriage practised by officials of Mongol army also came into vogue among the ethnic Mosuo people, particularly in the Yankouba and Tuodian villages.

== Legend ==
An ancient legend linked to the lake is that a beautiful female spirit by the name of Gemu had many local mountain spirits as her male friends. The young spirit was pretty and also had male friends among the male spirits from other mountain regions. During one of her intimate dalliances with a local male spirit, a mountain spirit from a distant mountain came to her house on horseback. When he found her in the company of a local male spirit, he felt humiliated and quickly turned his horse round and started going back. Gemu heard the neigh of the horse and realized that a distant mountain spirit had come on horseback to visit her. She came out of the house and started running after the visitor spirit. She could only see a large hoof print at the foot of the mountain where the male spirit had disappeared. As it was getting dark, Gemu could not proceed further and she started weeping frenziedly, which resulted in the hoofprint turning into a lake with her tears. When the male spirit heard her crying, and saw that the hoofprint had turned into a lake with her tears, he lovingly threw a few pearls and flowers into the lake. The pearls are identified now as the islands in the lake and the flowers which floated to the lake shore are said to be scented azaleas and other flowers, which bloom every year.

Another legend narrated about the creation of the lake is that Gemu had many lovers. One such lover was a god named Waru Shila. During their first meeting and romance amidst a garden of flowers they were oblivious to their surroundings without even realizing that daybreak had occurred. In order to escape discovery of their affair, Waru Shila fled from the scene on his horse towards the hill, while Gemu fondly looked at him from the shore of Lugu Lake. While trying to look back at his fiancée, Waru Shila was holding the reins of the horse very tight. As a result, the horse stumbled and fell. This caused a deep depression in the ground. Since daybreak had occurred, Waru could not return to his heaven and therefore transformed himself into a mountain, to the east of the lake. Looking aghast at this turn of events, Gemu cried intensely, which resulted in the depression being filled by her tears and eventually turning into Lugu Lake. She then cast seven of her pearls into the lake, which became the seven islands. She also turned herself into a mountain in order to keep a watch on the lake and to look at her lover in the east, who had also earlier turned into a mountain.

== Flora and fauna ==
Lugu Lake, set in the subalpine zone in the southern Hengduan Mountains, is a pine-covered ecoregion. Apart from hosting endemic species of fish, Lugu Lake is visited by wintering water birds. The catchment of the lake in the Ninglang province has a fairly rich forest cover. The plant and tree species identified in the forest are: Yunnan pines, Chinese pines, lacquer, camphor, Bombax ceiba (the red kapok) and dragon spruce trees.

The fauna found in the area include fox, musk deer, vultures, hawks and leopard.

=== Avifauna ===
The reported avifauna consists of migrant birds such as the bar-headed geese. Black-necked cranes (Grus nigricollis) are found in the Lugu Lake area which is under the Vu (vulnerable category as per IUCN).

=== Aquatic fauna ===
Four endemic species of fish were reported in the lake - three Schizothorax species and one Misgurnus anguillicaudatus. The endemic species of fish in the genus of Schizothorax include the thick lip species known as S. labrosus. These are also called snow trout as they have the shape of a trout with tiny scales.

Fish species and the development of fisheries in Lugu Lake have been researched during 2001, 2002 and 2004. The studies reported that there are now 12 fish species in Lugu Lake, which belong to 10 genera, four families and three orders. Changes to the proliferation of fish in the lake has been due to the deposition of silt in the lake following heavy deforestation of lake's catchment. In addition to the four endemic species, eight exotic species were identified and these dominate the fish population in the lake to the detriment of the endemic species. Fishing is normally carried out using gillnets. The nets are spread over the lake's entire length and width at different depths with mesh size varying to suit needs; they are usually spread from late afternoon to the morning hours of the following day. The eight exotic species, introduced to the lake in 1958 as part of commercial fishing activity, dominate the fishing resources of the lake, and three of the native species have been declared endangered. As a result of commercial fishing activity, the fish resources initially netted amounted to 500 tonnes. However, overfishing in the last few decades by trawlers has resulted in a drastic decline of the yield and in 1980 it was reported to be only 30 tonnes. The main reasons attributed for this decline are the heavy deforestation that occurred once in 1970 and then again between 1980 and 1990, which caused heavy siltation of the lake; the siltation advanced 100 metres (330 ft) into the lake causing destruction of many spawning grounds of the three Schizothorax fishes, followed by the decrease of their stocks. Another reason given for the decrease in endemic fish stocks is the introduction of the exotic species, which has led to a decline in the indigenous Schizothoracid species.

== Mosuo people ==
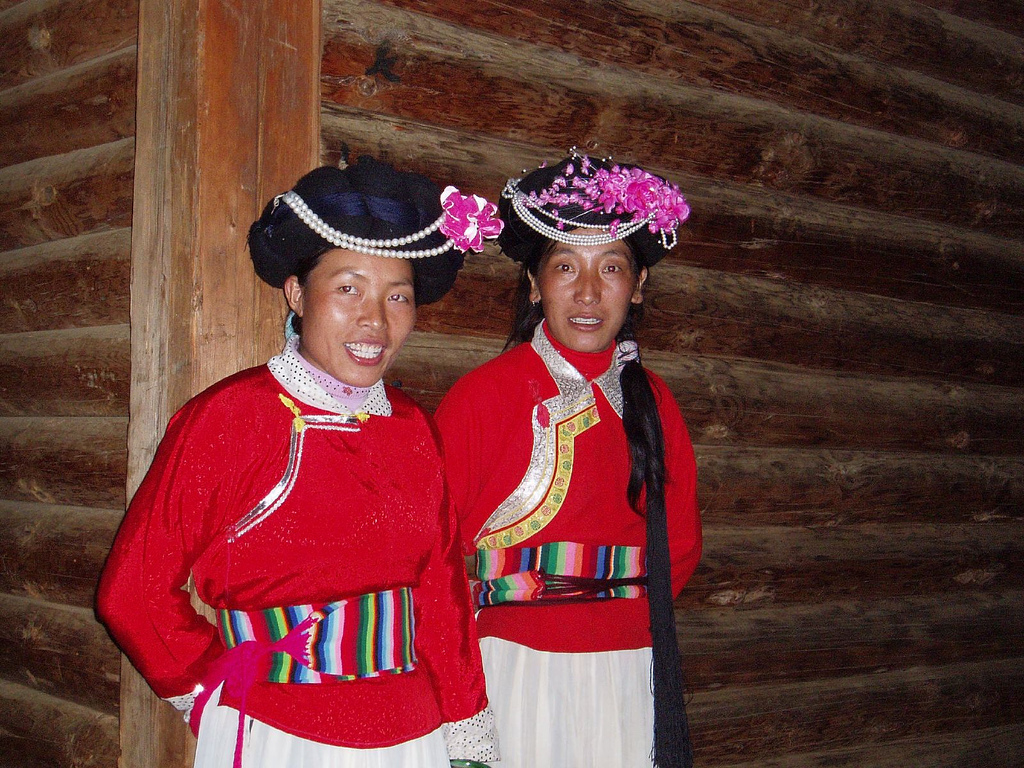
Colourfully attired Mosuo girls

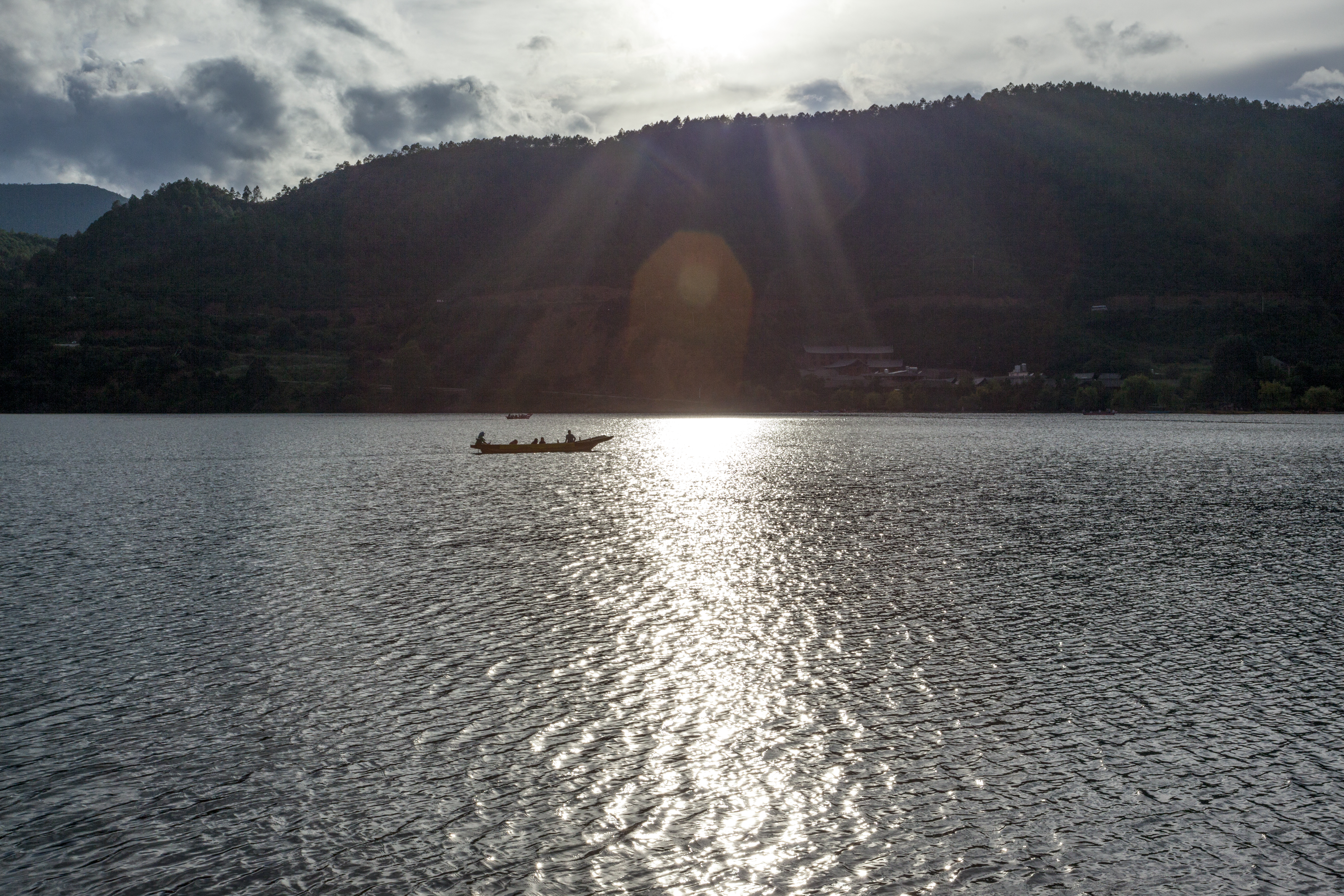
Local Mosuo boat on Lugu Lake

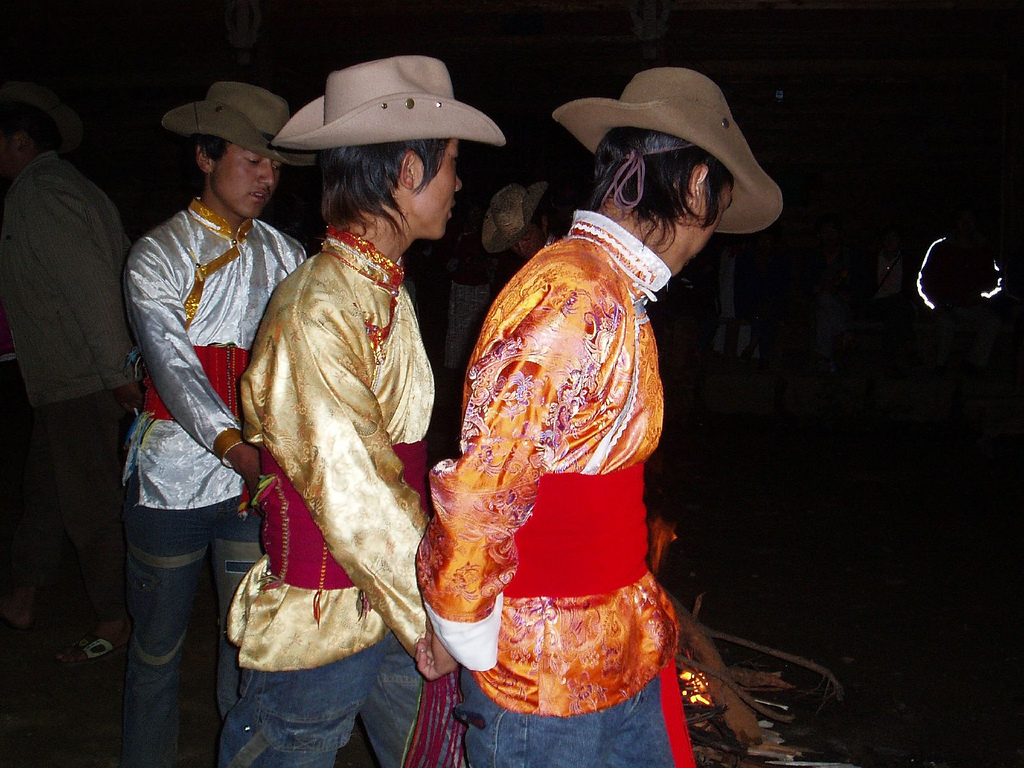
Musuo boys

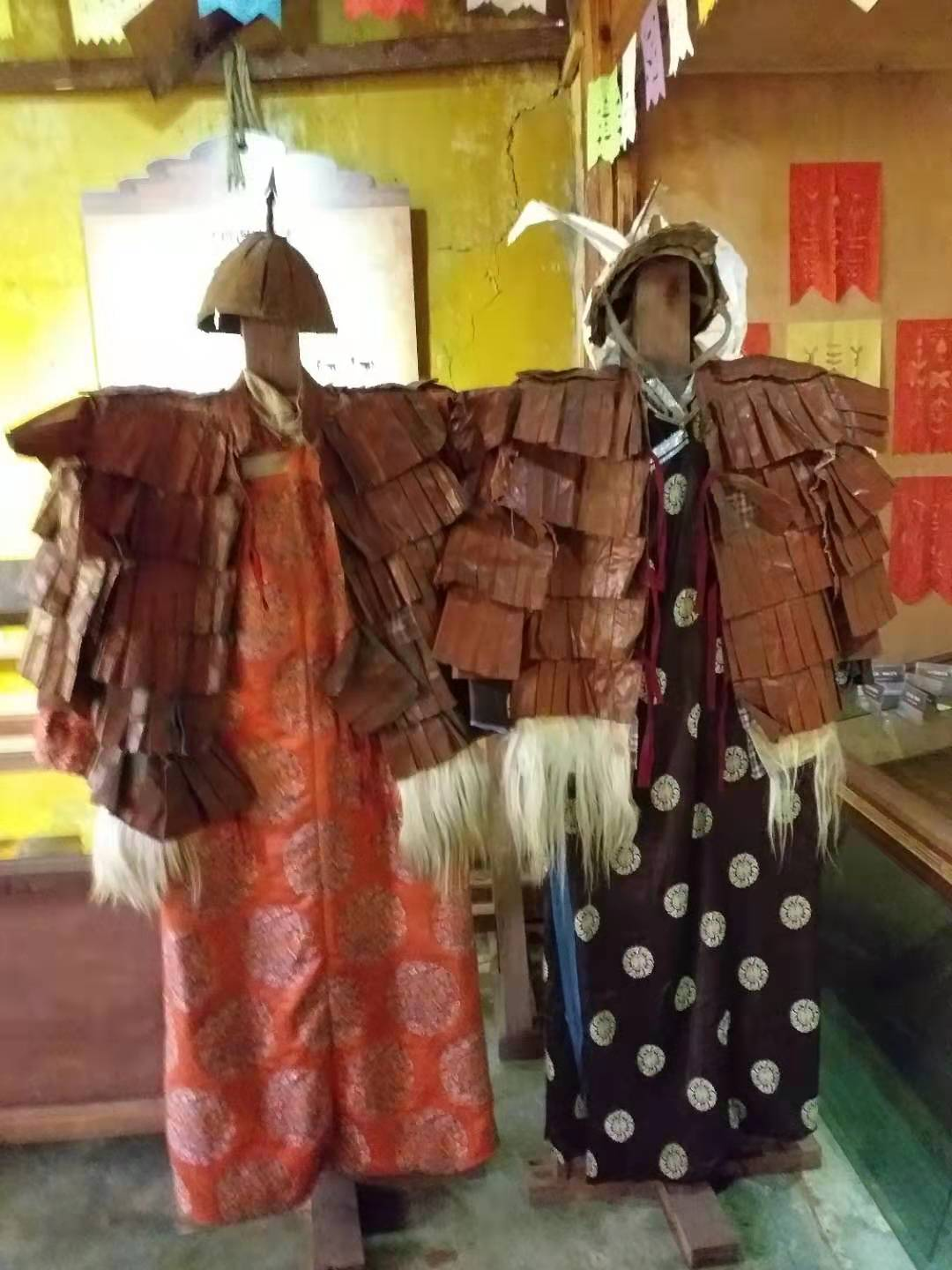
Clothes of religious ceremonies of Moso, photo taken at Moso's Folk museum

The Mosuo people's ancient history is identified with Lugu Lake and their interests are now protected by the "Lugu Lake Mosuo Cultural Development Association". They are advertised as a major tourist attraction of Lugu Lake for their matriarchal traditions and "walking marriages," where marriage is not sacrosanct as women exercise the right to choose and change their husbands at will. According to the 1990 database, there were 90,000 Mosuos, mostly concentrated around Lugu Lake. Their ethnicity has been defined as Masuo people belonging to the Pumi tribe, similar to the Mongolian ethnicity and a branch of the Naxi. Azu marriage is the way of living of the Mosuo people, and Azu in the local Mosuo language (which does not have its own script) means "intimate sweet heart". It is a convenient arrangement in which the partners come and go as they like. Three types of Azu marriages have been mentioned namely, the "travelling marriage," which is marriage without cohabitation; and the second type is the marriage with cohabitation that have developed into deep feelings after living under "travelling marriage" practice; they then live together and raise children as a family. The third type of marriage, which is linked to the history of Mongolian people occupying Lugu Lake who inculcated the practice of monogamous marriage among the Mosuo people, is called as "One on one marriage." However, in all the three types of marriages, women have the rightful ownership of land, houses and full rights to the children born to them. The children carry their mother's family name and pay greatest respect to their mothers who in turn enjoy high social status. It is for these reasons that Mosuo people of Lugu Lake are an attraction. The male companions are known as "axias" and they work for the women. Lugu Lake and Mosuo culture, though identified as syncratic, they are spread throughout the hills surrounding the lake. The heart of Mosuo culture is concentrated in Yongning, known as the cultural capital of Mosuo people and their largest religious Tibetan monastery is located here. Yang Erche Namu, a Chinese born in a small village near Lugu Lake, is a writer and singer of Mosuo ethnicity. She has written several books including the one titled Leaving Mother Lake, her first book in English. Her career and life is a story of controversies. The minority report in Time mentions "Sex appeals. And today, the area around Lugu Lake, the Mosuo homeland where Namu grew up, has become a chic tourist destination, thanks almost entirely to the renown that Namu's book has brought it." She had even proposed to the then divorced French president Nicolas Sarkozy during his visit to China; in a recorded video introduction uploaded to the internet, she praised the colour of his skin and stated that she would be "a perfect wife for him".

== Ethnic beliefs about the lake ==
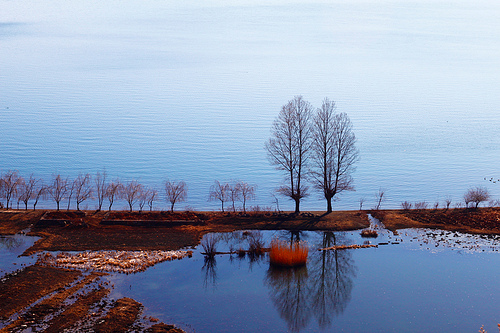
Marshy land in the periphery of Lugu Lake

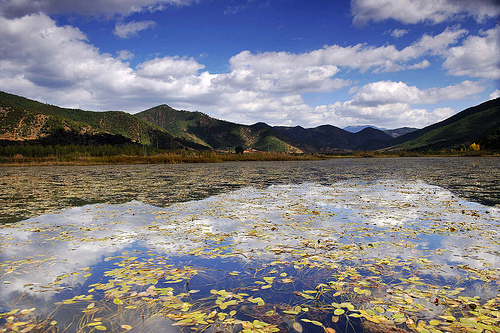
A view of Grass Sea on the shores of Lugu Lake

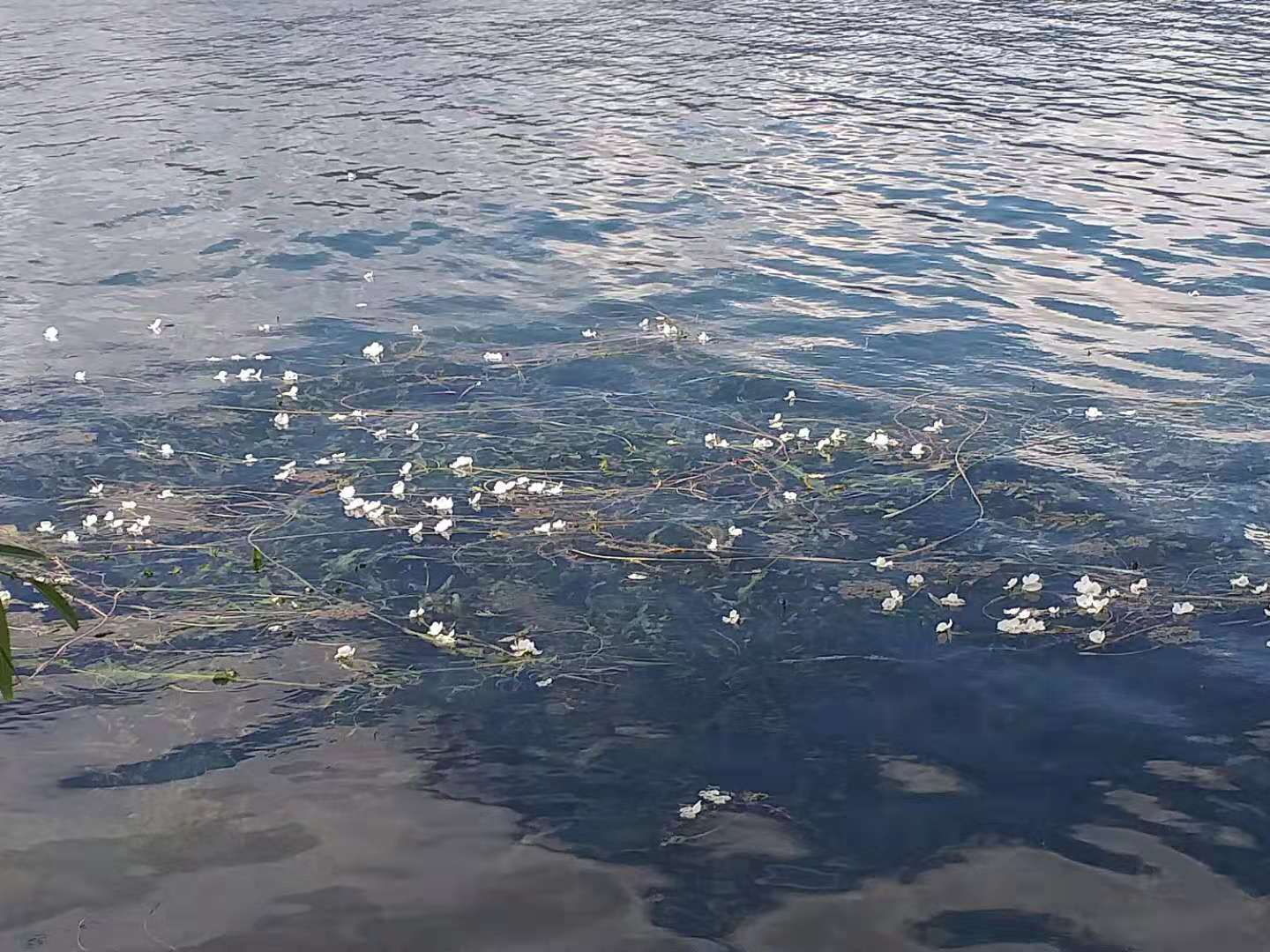
Ottelia acuminata var. crispa. Currently, we can only see it in Lugu Lake because it can only grow in extremely pure water. During the blossom season, the scene of the small white flowers covering the lake is spectacular.

The minority tribal community, which resides on the shores of Lugu Lake, have many beliefs and taboos linked to the lake. They hold the lake in sacred reverence and have taboos on killing of animals and felling of trees; and Mosuos, in particular consider animals and trees as innocent. Any body desecrating the lake, as a reparation, has to sacrifice an animal used in tilling and offer the meat to the villagers to eat, contact a "dingba or hangui, a shaman, to appease the spirits and restore topo-cosmic harmony" and pay obeisance to a Tibetan Buddhist Lama or local Lama. The fisher folk of the lake who practice zoned fishing in the lake believe that a black footed crane (Grus spp.) returning to Lugu Lake ushers prosperity.

As devout Buddhists, the Mosuo people make a devout annual circumambulation of the lake's shore in a clockwise direction. The prayer walk around the lake involves 35 miles (56 km) of trekking covering the numerous temples and stupas around the lake's shore. Generally, this parikrama is covered in a day. However, a leisurely three-day walk also takes place. The Buddhist influence on the lake's shore is also seen in the form of prayer flags and pyramidal stupas or chortens. The religious trek passes through the Lusoshui village of the Mosuo, farms, orchards, temples in islands, pebble beaches, crosses a fork which directs towards the Yongning, once the capital of Mosuo people. It passes under the shadow of Mount Gama, trees wound with multicoloured cloths, rainbow coloured Buddhist prayer flags with an animal symbol and Buddhist scriptures printed on them, rows of pine trees, pig trough canoes on the lake, wooden houses with upturned roofs (similar to those found in Lijiang city), agricultural land of red soils, white gulls on the lake waters; a change of territory into Sichuan from Yunnan region, pyramidal stupas made with square segments affixed with flat prayer inscribed stones; the Lama Temple (a three tiered red and white Buddhist structure with upturned eaves surrounded by colourful fluttering prayer flags and a 15 feet (4.6 m) fresco with a monk praying amidst scenic surroundings of mountains and clouds, altars, drums brass gongs and so forth) near the Grass Sea. It then passes through the house of the iconic Yang Erche Namu (the Lugu Lake native who is famous for her writings on Musuo and its people and for her singing and artistic talents) known as "China's Sexiest Woman", and continues through eucalyptus groves and marshes, finally ending the trek at the lake.

== Gallery ==
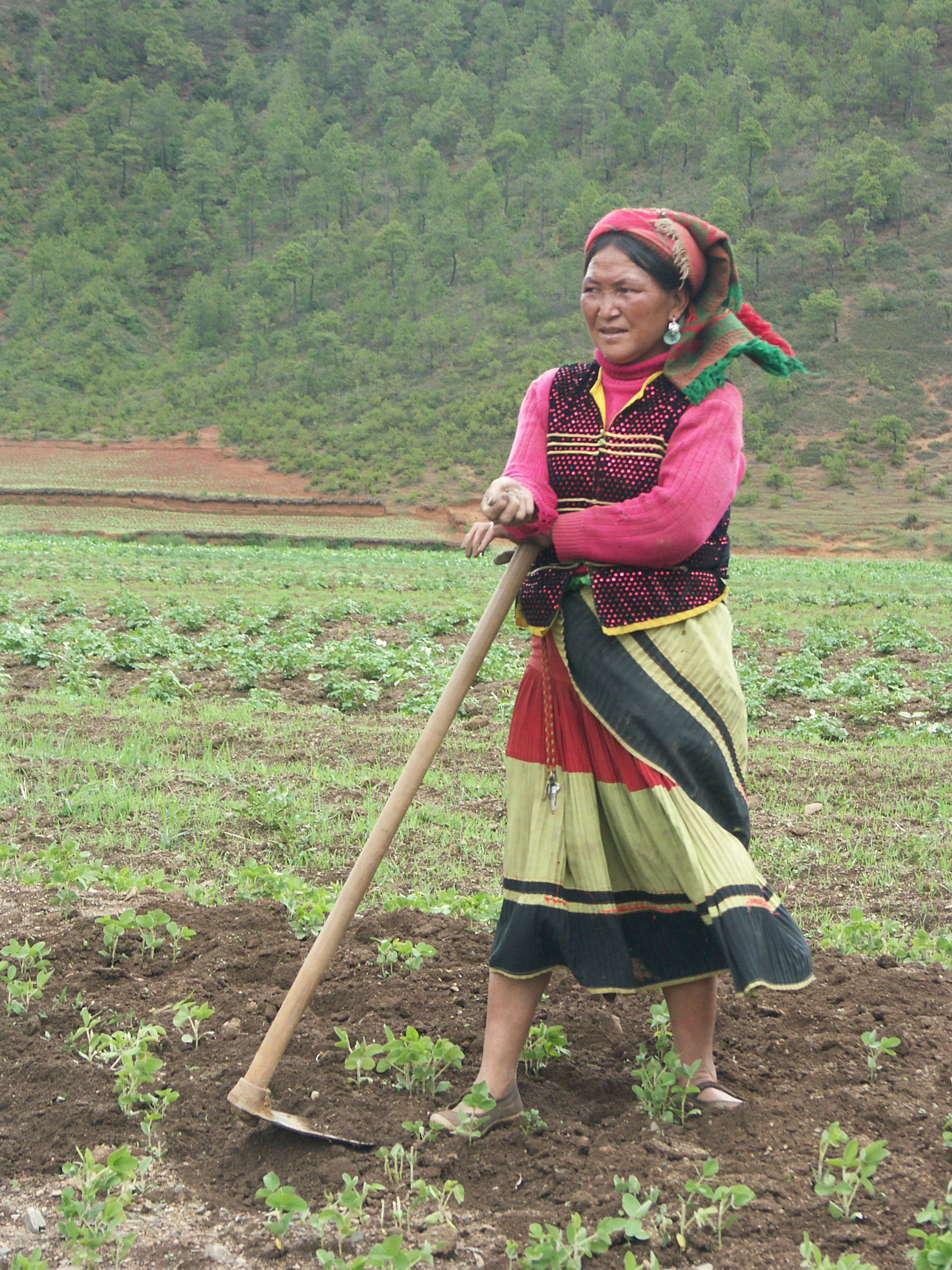
A Yi woman near Lugu Lake

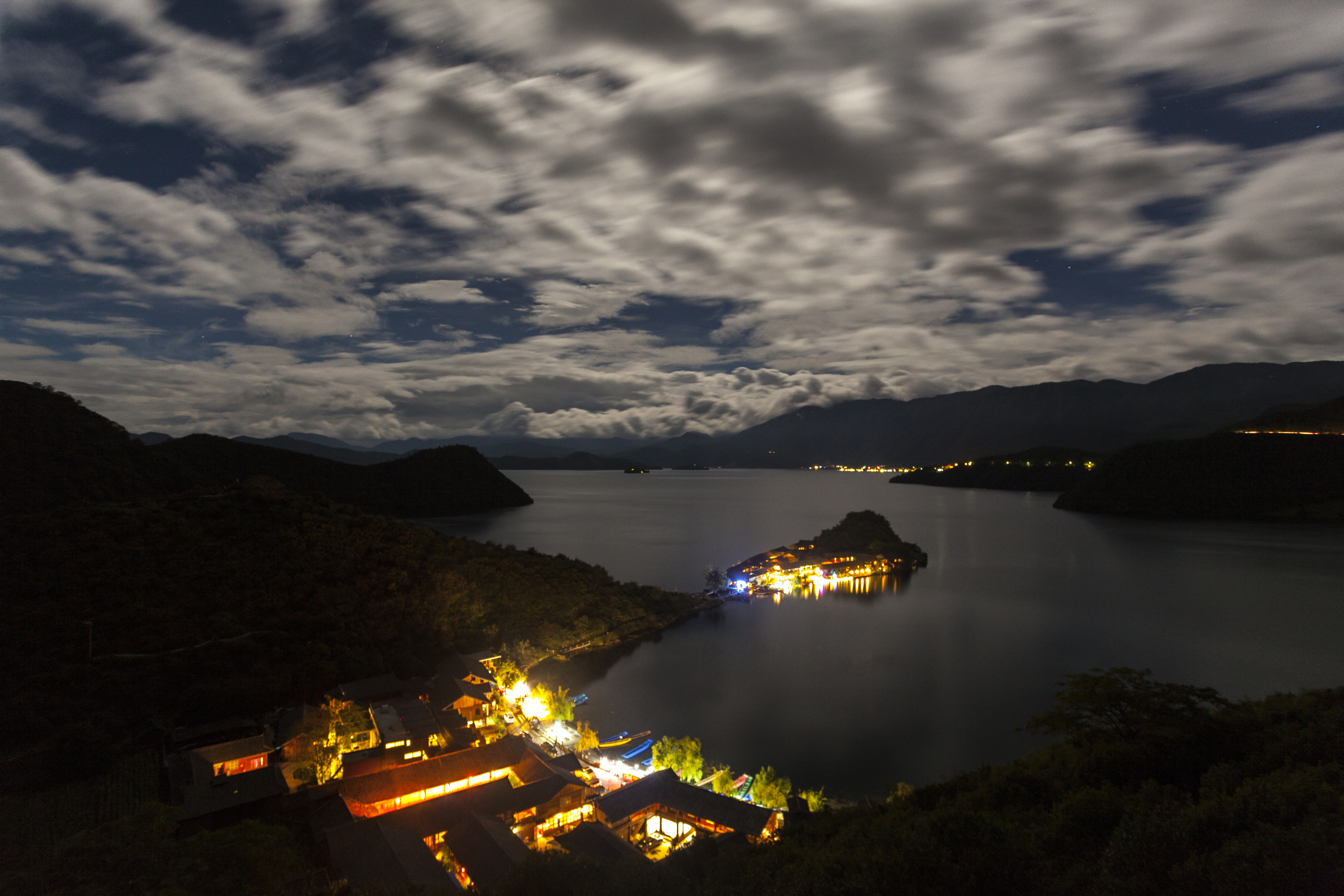
Lugu lake at night

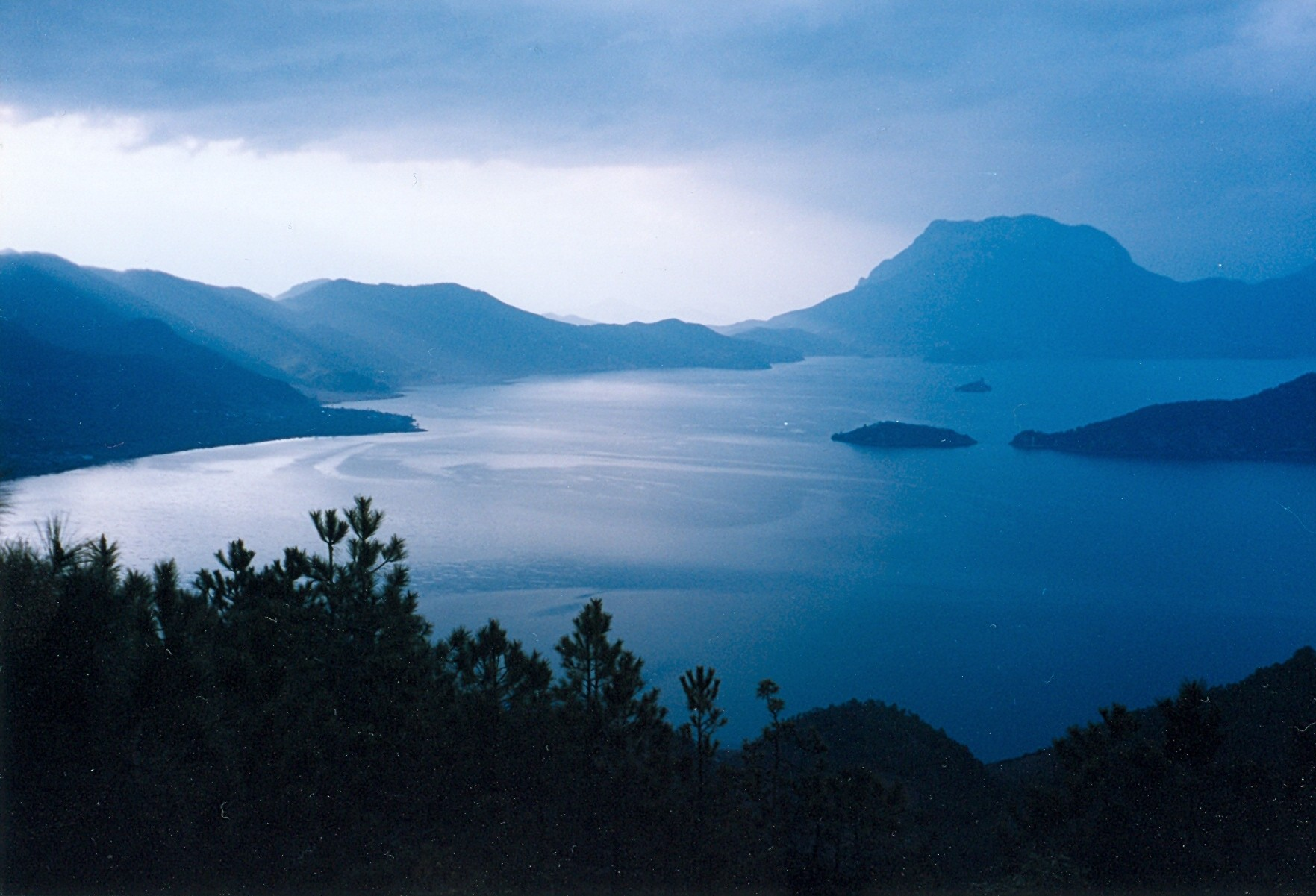
Lugu Lake

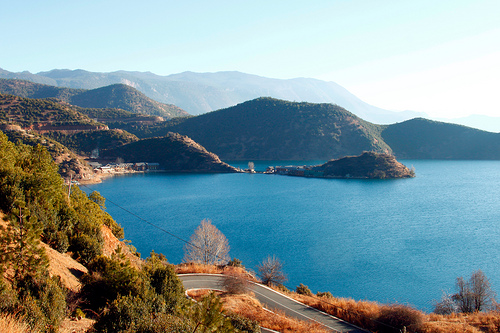
Lugu Lake

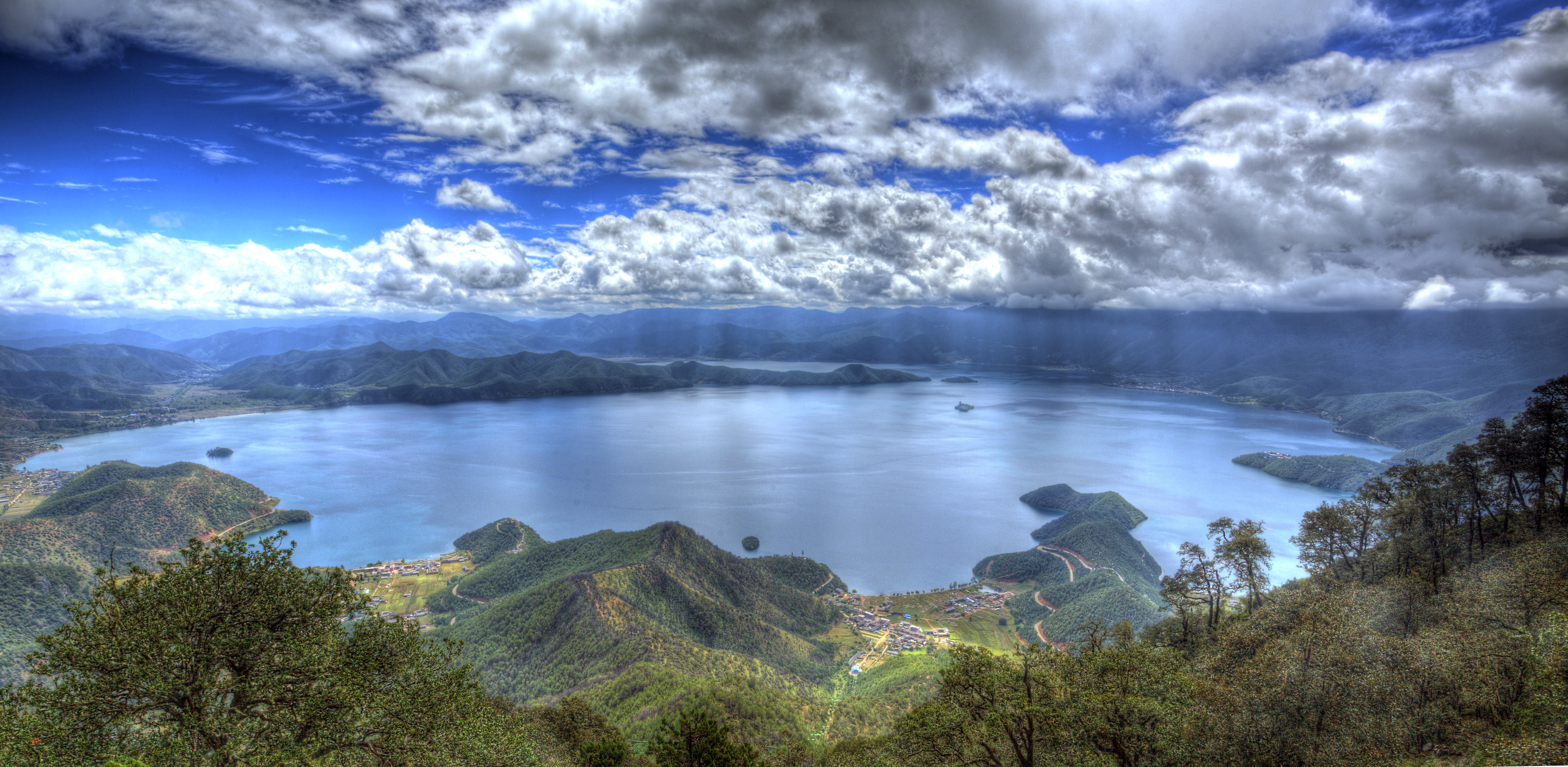
Lugu Lake on the border of Yunnan and Sichuan provinces, China. Taken from Lion Mountain
