= Chiefdom of Yongning =

Mosuo Tusi chiefdom (1381–1956)

Chiefdom of Yongning 永寧土司
- 1381–1956
- Capital: Yongning
- Common languages: Naxi language
- Government: Monarchy
- Chieftain
  - 1381–?: Budu Geji (first)
  - 1930–1956: A Minhan (last)
- History
  - Established: 1381
  - Disestablished: 1956
Preceded by	Succeeded by
Yuan dynasty	People's Republic of China
- Today part of: China

Chiefdom of Yongning (simplified Chinese: 永宁土司; traditional Chinese: 永寧土司; pinyin: Yǒngníng Tǔsī) was a Mosuo autonomous Tusi chiefdom during the Ming and Qing dynasties. The chiefdom was located at present-day Ninglang Yi Autonomous County at the convergence of Yunnan, Sichuan and Tibet.

According to legend, the ancestor of Yongning chieftains was from Tibet. He arrived at Yongning in 24 AD. Yongning was a part of Nanzhao and later a part of the Dali Kingdom. The Mongol Empire invaded Dali in 1253. He Zi (和字), the chieftain of Yongning, surrendered to the Mongol Empire. The chiefdom later came under the administration of the Yuan dynasty.

Yongning swore allegiance to the Ming dynasty since 1371. Chieftain Budu Geji (卜都各吉) went to the Ming capital to have an audience with the Hongwu Emperor in 1381, from then on, Yongning joined the Ming Tusi System. Since 1406, the hereditary chieftains received the official position "Magistrate of Yongning" (永寧知府) from the Ming emperor.

A Ju (阿苴) was the first chieftain who used the surname "A" (阿). Joseph Rock stated that the surname was given by the Ming emperor. On one occasion the chieftain came to have an audience with the Ming emperor. The chieftain did not understand the Chinese language. When the Ming emperor spoke to him, he replied "ah", so was given the surname "A".

According to The Ancient Nakhi Kingdom of Southwest China by Joseph Rock, Yongning used to be great power. However, in 1648, Muli was given to a lama and established the Chiefdom of Muli; later, in 1710, Yongning was divided into several chiefdoms under the order of the Kangxi Emperor.

In 1917, Chiefdom of Langqu (蒗蕖土司) was abolished, its territory merged into Yongning. Since then, Yongning changed its name to Ninglang. Yongning Chiefdom was abolished by the Chinese Communist Party in 1956.

== List of chieftains of Yongning ==
Name	Reign	Notes
Budu Geji 卜都各吉	1381 –?	
Geji Bahe 各吉巴合	? – 1414	
Busa 卜撒	1414 – October 1417	murdered by Lamafei
Lamafei 剌馬非	October 1417 – July 31, 1423	usurper chieftain of Zuosuo (左所土司)
Nanba 南八	July 31, 1423 – 1458	
A Ju 阿苴	July 28, 1458 – 1484	started to use the Chinese surname "A" (阿)
A Chuo 阿綽	September 12, 1484 – 1496	
A Gui 阿貴	February 22, 1496 – 1515	
A Hui 阿暉	July 24, 1515 – 1530	
A He 阿和	May 29, 1540 – 1557	
A Ying 阿英	September 27, 1557 – 1574	
A Xiong 阿雄	September 19, 1574 – 1586	
A Chengzhong 阿承忠	1591 – 1610	
A Quan 阿銓	1610 – ?	coronation: July 11, 1614
A Zhenlin 阿鎮麟	? – August 27, 1669	
A Tingkun 阿庭錕	1670 – 1705	
A Jinhui 阿錦暉	January 23, 1707 – December 29, 1711	
A Jinxian 阿錦先	May 16, 1727 – May 24, 1727	
A Youwei 阿有威	April 28, 1728 – April 26, 1740	
A Shichang 阿世昌	November 1741 – 1770	
A Liangbi 阿良弼	1770 – 1771	not recognized by China
A Qichang 阿啓昌	October 16, 1771 – March 28, 1796	
A Liangfu 阿良輔	April 27, 1798 – October 21, 1815	
A Huiyuan 阿會元	March 12, 1817 – March 4, 1867	
A Yuxing 阿毓興	1867 – 1879	not recognized by China
A Hengfang 阿恒芳	April 23, 1879 – 1894	
A Yingrui 阿應瑞	1894–October 6, 1923	
A Minhan 阿民漢	March 1930 – 1956	title abolished

== See also ==
- Mosuo
- Chiefdom of Lijiang
- Nakhi people
