= Daxing, Ninglang County =

Daxing 大兴镇
- Town
- Location in Yunnan
- Coordinates: 27°16′53″N 100°51′0″E
- Country: People's Republic of China
- Province: Yunnan
- Prefecture-level city: Lijiang
- Autonomous county: Ninglang Yi Autonomous County
- Time zone: UTC+8 (China Standard)

Daxing (simplified Chinese: 大兴; traditional Chinese: 大興; pinyin: Dàxīng) is a town under the administration of Ninglang Yi Autonomous County, Yunnan, China. As of 2018, it has seven residential communities and six villages under its administration.
