= Hui County =

Hui County 徽县
- County
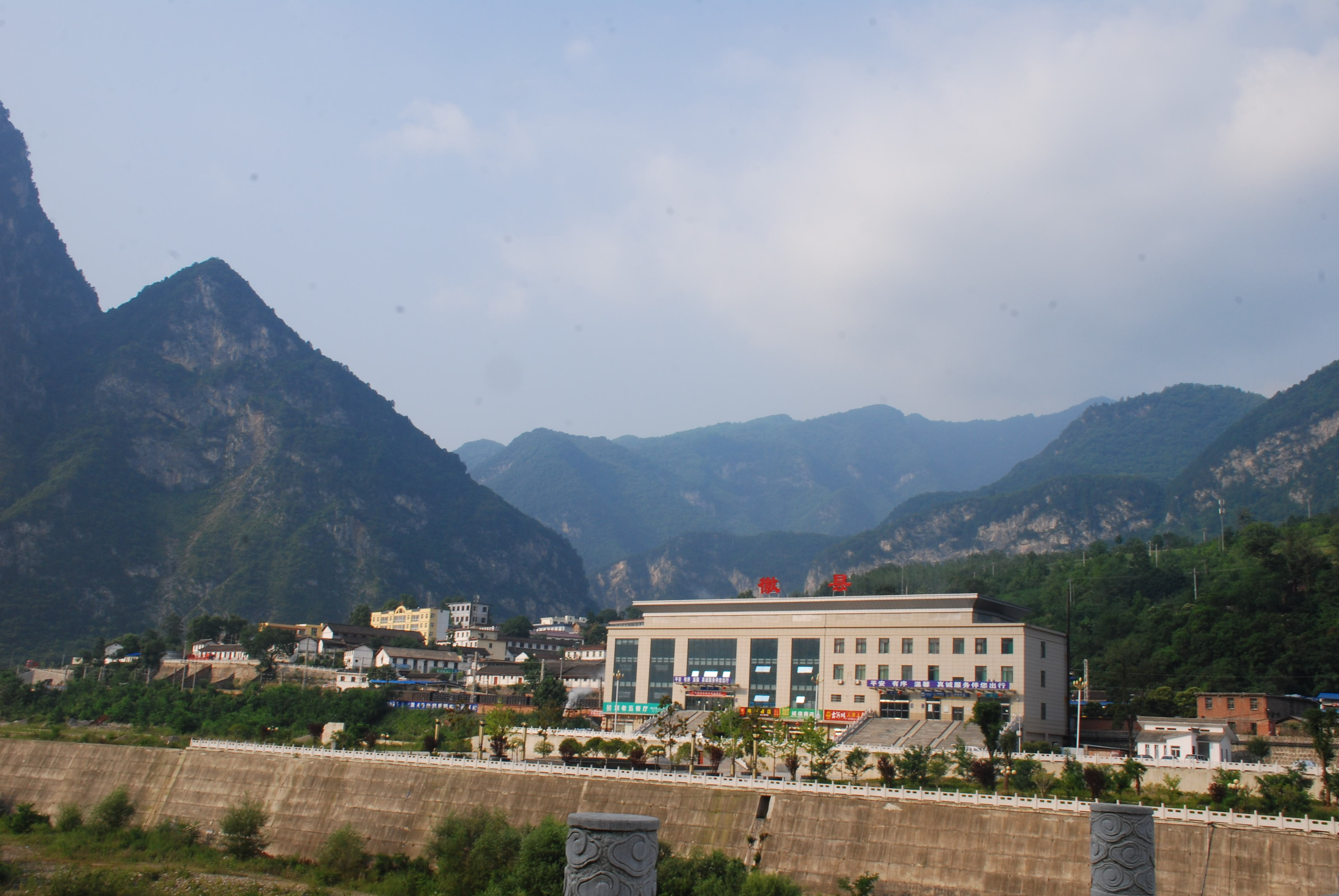
- Hui County railway station

- Location of the seat in Gansu
- Coordinates: 33°51′54.00″N 106°01′19.20″E
- Country: China
- Province: Gansu
- Prefecture-level city: Longnan
- County seat: Chengguan

Area
  - Total: 2,722.9 km^{2} (1,051.3 sq mi)
- Highest elevation (near Jialing Town): 2,504 m (8,215 ft)
- Lowest elevation (near Yuguan Township): 704 m (2,310 ft)

Population (2015)
  - Total: 223,500
  - Density: 82.08/km^{2} (212.6/sq mi)
- Time zone: UTC+8 (China Standard)
- Postal code: 742300
- Website: zwfw.gshxzf.gov.cn/webSite/index.html

Hui County or Huixian (simplified Chinese: 徽县; traditional Chinese: 徽縣; pinyin: Huī Xiàn) is a county under the administration of Longnan City, in the southeast of Gansu Province, China, bordering Shaanxi province to the south. The postal code is 742300.

The population was 209,113 in 1999.

== Administrative divisions ==
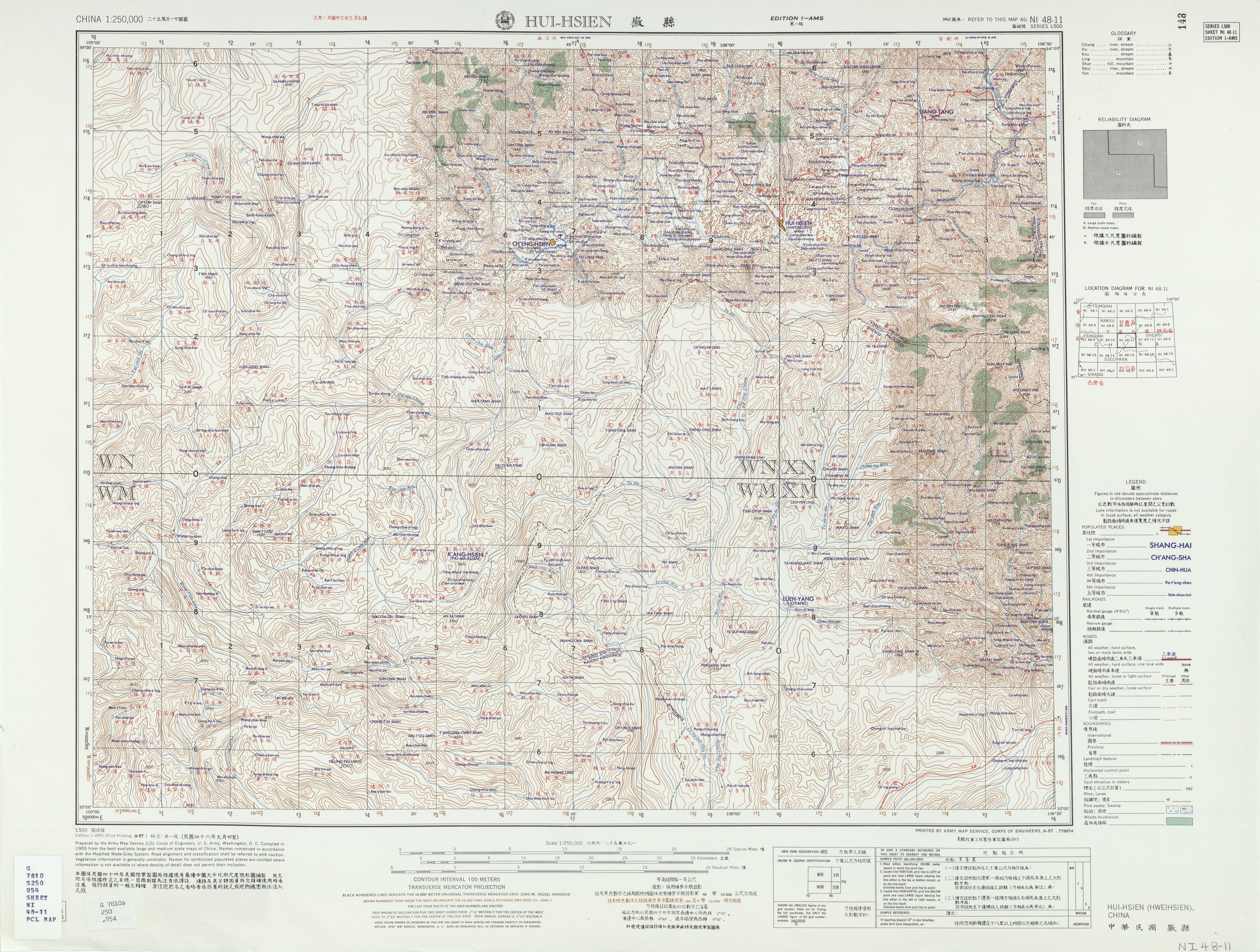
Map including Hui County (labeled as HUI-HSIEN (HWEIHSIEN) (walled) 徽縣) (AMS, 1955)

Hui County is divided into 13 towns and 2 townships:

Towns

- Chengguan (城关镇)
- Fujia (伏家镇)
- Jiangluo (江洛镇)
- Niyang (泥阳镇)
- Liulin (柳林镇)
- Jialing (嘉陵镇)
- Yongning (永宁镇)

-Towns are upgraded from Township.

- Yinxingshu (银杏树镇)
- Shuiyang (水阳镇)
- Lichuan (栗川镇)
- Mayanhe (麻沿河镇)
- Gaoqiao (高桥镇)
- Dahedian (大河店镇)

Townships

- Yushu Township (榆树乡)
- Yuguan Township (虞关乡)

== Climate ==
Climate data for Huixian, elevation 1,003 m (3,291 ft), (1991–2020 normals, extremes 1981–present)
Month	Jan	Feb	Mar	Apr	May	Jun	Jul	Aug	Sep	Oct	Nov	Dec	Year
Record high °C (°F)	16.3 (61.3)	21.0 (69.8)	29.9 (85.8)	32.6 (90.7)	34.4 (93.9)	37.8 (100.0)	37.7 (99.9)	37.4 (99.3)	35.9 (96.6)	28.1 (82.6)	22.3 (72.1)	15.8 (60.4)	37.8 (100.0)
Mean daily maximum °C (°F)	6.2 (43.2)	9.6 (49.3)	15.1 (59.2)	21.3 (70.3)	24.9 (76.8)	28.2 (82.8)	29.9 (85.8)	28.8 (83.8)	23.2 (73.8)	17.8 (64.0)	12.4 (54.3)	7.2 (45.0)	18.7 (65.7)
Daily mean °C (°F)	0.0 (32.0)	3.4 (38.1)	8.3 (46.9)	13.7 (56.7)	17.6 (63.7)	21.4 (70.5)	23.6 (74.5)	22.6 (72.7)	17.8 (64.0)	12.4 (54.3)	6.5 (43.7)	1.0 (33.8)	12.4 (54.2)
Mean daily minimum °C (°F)	−4.0 (24.8)	−0.9 (30.4)	3.3 (37.9)	7.9 (46.2)	11.9 (53.4)	16.0 (60.8)	18.9 (66.0)	18.3 (64.9)	14.5 (58.1)	9.1 (48.4)	2.8 (37.0)	−2.9 (26.8)	7.9 (46.2)
Record low °C (°F)	−14.3 (6.3)	−10.6 (12.9)	−9.6 (14.7)	−2.3 (27.9)	1.5 (34.7)	6.7 (44.1)	12.4 (54.3)	10.6 (51.1)	4.4 (39.9)	−4.8 (23.4)	−8.8 (16.2)	−16.4 (2.5)	−16.4 (2.5)
Average precipitation mm (inches)	5.6 (0.22)	9.4 (0.37)	24.0 (0.94)	41.7 (1.64)	68.1 (2.68)	82.5 (3.25)	135.3 (5.33)	126.8 (4.99)	106.7 (4.20)	60.8 (2.39)	19.1 (0.75)	4.9 (0.19)	684.9 (26.95)
Average precipitation days (≥ 0.1 mm)	5.4	5.7	8.3	8.8	11.5	11.3	12.8	12.2	14.0	13.2	7.9	4.5	115.6
Average snowy days	8.2	4.6	1.3	0.2	0	0	0	0	0	0	1.1	3.8	19.2
Average relative humidity (%)	70	67	66	67	71	73	77	80	85	85	80	74	75
Mean monthly sunshine hours	123.8	106.8	139.8	173.9	192.0	181.2	189.2	178.3	102.8	97.1	103.9	123.0	1,711.8
Percentage possible sunshine	39	34	37	44	44	42	43	43	28	28	34	40	38
Source: China Meteorological Administration all-time July record
