= Yang Erche Namu =

Chinese writer

- Born: 1966 (age 59–60); Yunnan
- Education: Shanghai Conservatory of Music

Chinese name
- Simplified Chinese: 杨二车娜姆
- Traditional Chinese: 楊二車娜姆
Transcriptions
Standard Mandarin
- Hanyu Pinyin: Yáng Èrchē Nàmǔ

Yang Erche Namu (born August 1966) is a Chinese writer and singer of Mosuo ethnicity.

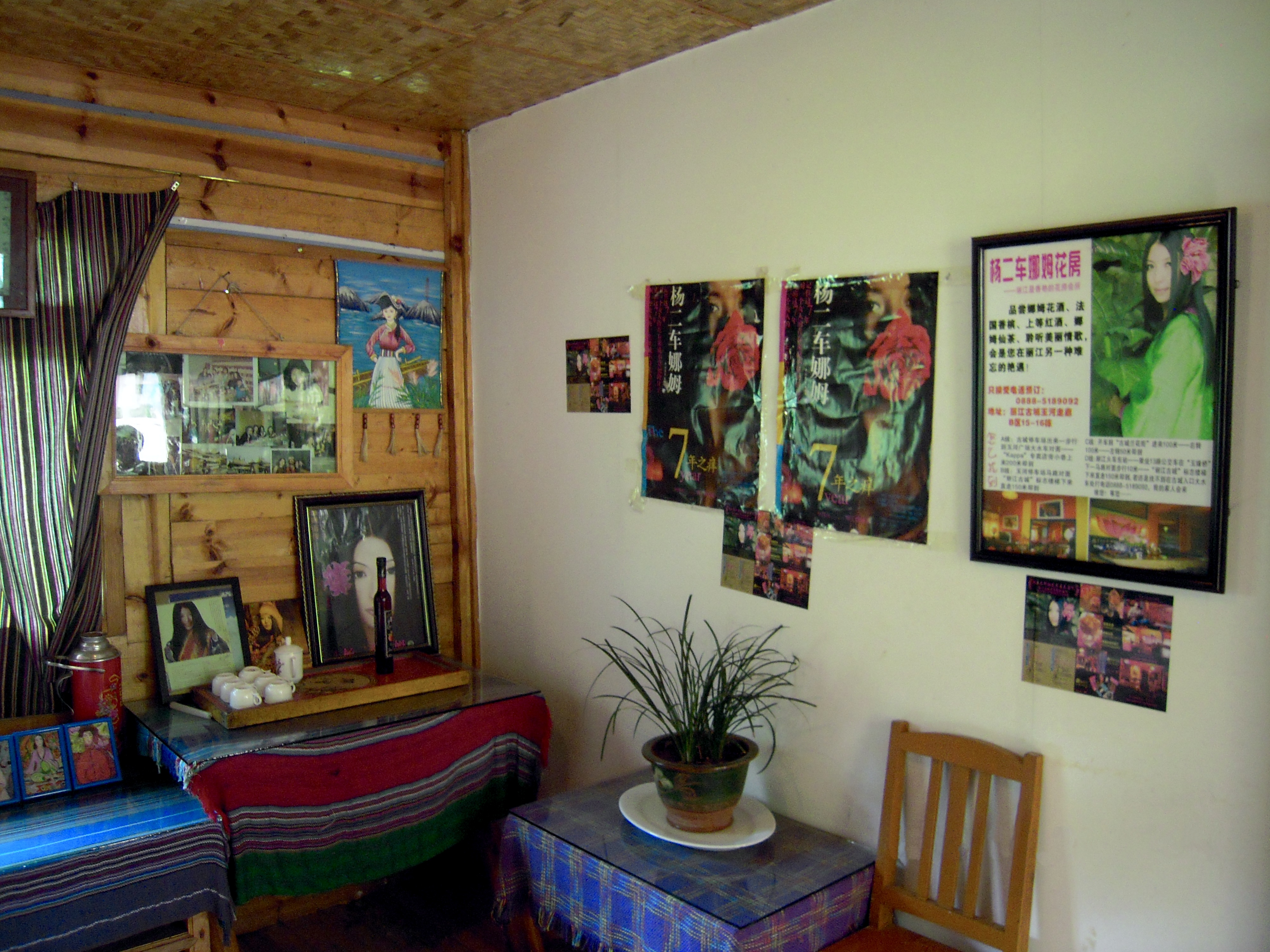
The birthplace of Yang Erche Namu, sightseeing is allowed.

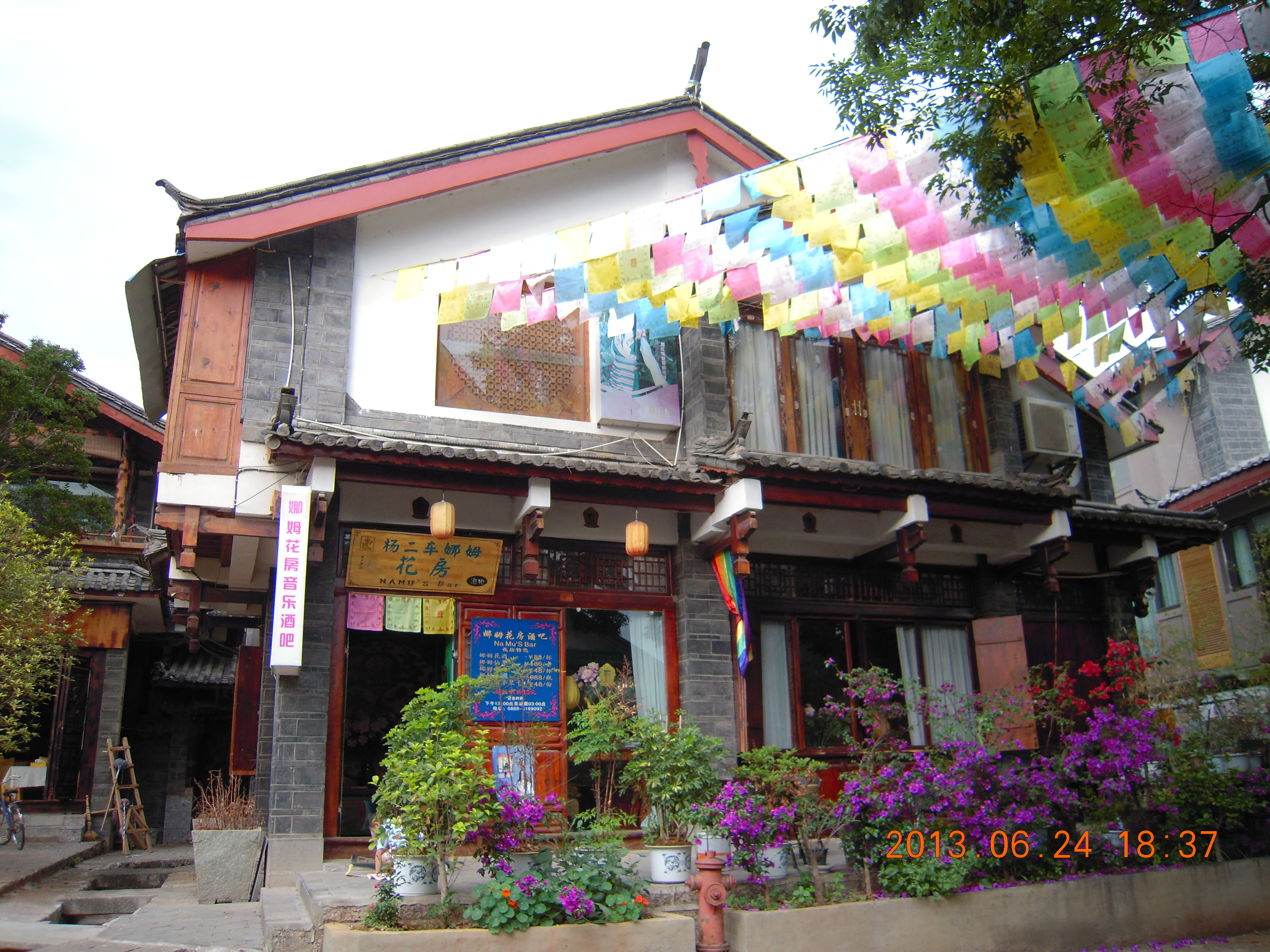
A bar operated by Yang Erche Namu in the Old Town of Lijiang

== Early life ==
Yang Erche Namu was born in a small village near Lugu Lake, in northern Yunnan province, but left at age thirteen; after arriving in neighbouring Yanyuan County, she joined a singing troupe and won a scholarship to study music in Shanghai. She began receiving attention outside of China as early as 1991, when she was featured in an article in National Geographic Magazine; she later married an American musician and moved to San Francisco, California with him, but they faced marital difficulties due to cultural differences and divorced. After the divorce, she worked four or five different jobs; stress during this period caused her to lose her hearing in her right ear, bringing her singing career to an end. In February 1996, while in Italy, Namu received news of the Lijiang earthquake, and quickly bought plane tickets back to Yunnan. On the way there, she stopped by Beijing, where she met her second husband-to-be, a Norwegian embassy worker.

== Later career ==
Yang Erche Namu launched her writing career in 1997 with the best-selling Leaving the Kingdom of Daughters. Between then and 2003, she wrote another eight autobiographies. Her first book in English, Leaving Mother Lake, was co-written with anthropologist Christine Mathieu. Her descriptions of her childhood and the culture she comes from have been characterised as deliberate self-exotification; they have also irritated many of her co-ethnics, who sometimes try to claim that she is in fact not Mosuo at all. She in turn rejects Mosuo men, claiming that they smell bad. Her books also criticise Chinese men at large; she claims they hate her because she "make[s] them feel like nothing", in contrast to Chinese women, who supposedly love her. Continuous criticism of her in the media has led her to compare herself to Jiang Qing, wife of Mao Zedong.

In recent years, Namu has further diversified her career. She co-starred alongside Jeremy Miller and Wang Luoyong in the 2005 joint American-Chinese movie Milk and Fashion, in which she played the role of a restaurant owner. Then in 2007, she joined the judges panel of Happy Boys Voice, a male version of the 2005/2006 hit Super Girl, produced by Hunan Satellite Television. Her appearances on the show were controversial; she claims that State Administration of Radio, Film, and Television forced her off the air for one week due to an excessively gaudy feather hat she wore during one episode. Later, she quarrelled with fellow judge Zheng Jun, a popular Chinese rock star, over her rejection of a contestant from Xi'an whom she derided for having red eyes and a pimple on his lips. These incidents contributed to her image as "the biggest bitch in China", in her own words. Later that year, she proposed to recently divorced French president Nicolas Sarkozy during his visit to China; in a recorded video introduction uploaded to the internet, she praised the color of his skin and stated that she would be "a perfect wife for him".

== Works ==
- Yang Erche Namu (April 1997), 《走出女儿国》 (in Chinese), Zhongguo Shehui Chubanshe, ISBN 7-80088-523-2
- Yang Erche Namu (June 1999), 《女人品—闻香识女人》 (in Chinese), Zuojia Chubanshe, ISBN 7-5063-1744-3
- Yang Erche Namu (May 2001), 《女人游—凤眼看天下》 (in Chinese), Huawen Chubanshe, ISBN 7-80175-081-0
- Yang Erche Namu (September 2002), 《女人梦—烟雨是天涯》 (in Chinese), China Youth Press, ISBN 7-5006-4825-1
- Yang Erche Namu (January 2003), 《中國紅遇見挪威藍》 (in Chinese), Chang'an Press, ISBN 7-80175-079-9
- Yang Erche Namu (May 2003), 《你也可以》 (in Chinese), Chang'an Press, ISBN 7-80175-083-7
- Yang Erche Namu; Mathieu, Christine (February 2004), Leaving Mother Lake: A Girlhood at the Edge of the World, Back Bay Books, ISBN 0-316-73549-3
- Yang Erche Namu (September 2004), 《7年之痒—中国红别了挪威蓝》 (in Chinese), China Youth Press, ISBN 7-5006-5927-X
- Yang Erche Namu (October 2004), 《一会儿就回来——我的社交心得》 (in Chinese), Beijing Shiyue Wenyi Chubanshe, ISBN 7-5302-0750-4
- Yang Erche Namu (January 2005), 《暗香—中国女人的性感与传情》 (in Chinese), Beijing Shiyue Wenyi Chubanshe, ISBN 7-5302-0762-8
- Yang Erche Namu (June 2006), Chang de piao liang bu ru huo de piao liang 《长得漂亮不如活得漂亮》 (in Chinese), China Youth Press, ISBN 7-5006-6570-9
