= Yitong River =

River in Jilin, China

Coordinates: 44.7683°N 125.6894°E

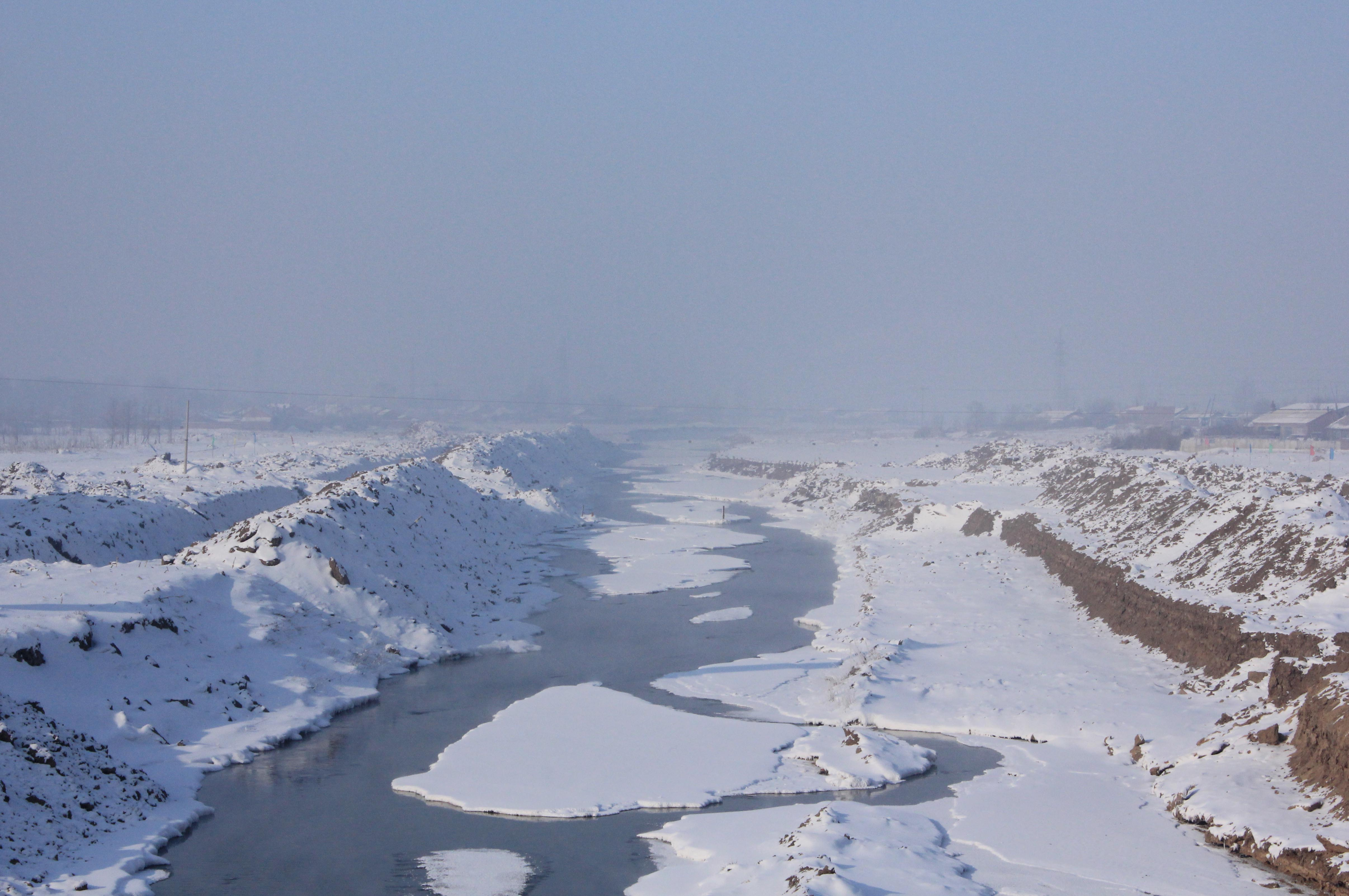
Yitong River in winter.

The Yitong River (Chinese: 伊通河) is a river in Jilin Province. It is the mother river of Changchun, the capital of Jilin Province.

== General ==
The Yitong River starts in Yitong Manchu Autonomous County, flows north through Changchun and Dehui cities, and flows into the Yinma River, one of the branch rivers of the Songhua River. It is 342 kilometers long and has a total drainage area of 8,440 square kilometers.

During the Southern and Northern Dynasties in the Chinese history, Buyeo Kingdom built a castle along the Yitong.
