= Yongning Township, Wanyuan =

Yongning Township 永宁乡
- Township
- Location in Sichuan
- Coordinates: 32°10′13″N 107°51′4″E
- Country: People's Republic of China
- Province: Sichuan
- Prefecture-level city: Dazhou
- County-level city: Wanyuan
- Time zone: UTC+8 (China Standard)

Yongning Township (simplified Chinese: 永宁乡; traditional Chinese: 永寧鄉; pinyin: Yǒngníng Xiāng) is a township under the administration of Wanyuan, Sichuan, China. As of 2018, it has one residential community and six villages under its administration.
