= Yongning, Cangxi County =

Yongning 永宁镇
- Town
- Location in Sichuan
- Coordinates: 32°0′31″N 105°53′2″E
- Country: People's Republic of China
- Province: Sichuan
- Prefecture-level city: Guangyuan
- County: Cangxi County
- Time zone: UTC+8 (China Standard)

Yongning (simplified Chinese: 永宁; traditional Chinese: 永寧; pinyin: Yǒngníng) is a town under the administration of Cangxi County, Sichuan, China. As of 2018, it has one residential community and 10 villages under its administration.
