= Yongning Subdistrict, Luzhou =

Yongning Subdistrict 永宁街道
- Subdistrict
- Location in Sichuan
- Coordinates: 28.7691°N 105.3830°E
- Country: People's Republic of China
- Province: Sichuan
- Prefecture-level city: Luzhou
- District: Naxi District
- Time zone: UTC+8 (China Standard)

Yongning Subdistrict (simplified Chinese: 永宁街道; traditional Chinese: 永寧街道; pinyin: Yǒngníng Jiēdào) is a subdistrict in Naxi District, Luzhou, Sichuan, China. As of 2018, it has 7 residential communities and 3 villages under its administration.

== See also ==
- List of township-level divisions of Sichuan
