= Yitong Town =

Yitong 伊通镇
- Town
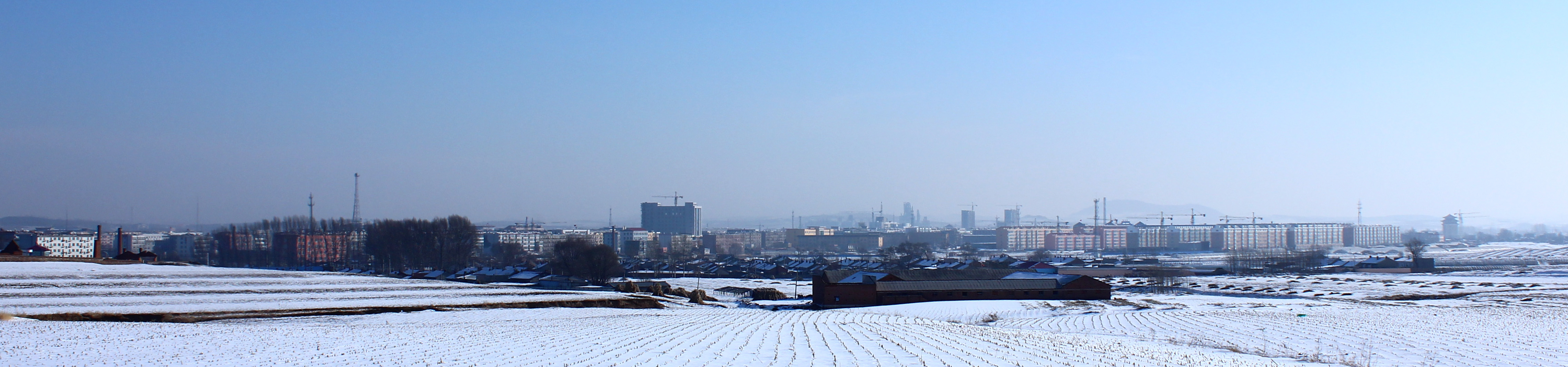

- Location in Jilin
- Coordinates: 43°20′44″N 125°18′14″E
- Country: People's Republic of China
- Province: Jilin
- Prefecture-level city: Siping
- County: Yitong

Area
  - Total: 263 km^{2} (102 sq mi)
- Elevation: 422 m (1,385 ft)

Population
  - Total: 115,752
  - Density: 440/km^{2} (1,140/sq mi)
- Time zone: UTC+8 (China Standard)
- Postal code: 130700
- Area code: 0434

Yitong (Chinese: 伊通; pinyin: Yītōng) is a town and the county seat of Yitong Manchu Autonomous County in western Jilin province, China.
