= Yongning Subdistrict, Yitong County =

Yongning Subdistrict 永宁街道
- Subdistrict
- Location in Jilin
- Coordinates: 43°20′58″N 125°18′16″E
- Country: People's Republic of China
- Province: Jilin
- Prefecture-level city: Siping
- Autonomous county: Yitong Manchu Autonomous County
- Time zone: UTC+8 (China Standard)

Yongning Subdistrict (simplified Chinese: 永宁街道; traditional Chinese: 永寧街道; pinyin: Yǒngníng Jiēdào) is a subdistrict in Yitong Manchu Autonomous County, Jilin, China. As of 2018, it has 5 residential communities and 3 villages under its administration.

== See also ==
- List of township-level divisions of Jilin
