= Yongning Township, Ninglang County =

Yongning Township 永宁乡
- Township
- Location in Yunnan
- Coordinates: 27°45′39″N 100°39′41″E
- Country: People's Republic of China
- Province: Yunnan
- Prefecture-level city: Lijiang
- Autonomous county: Ninglang Yi Autonomous County
- Time zone: UTC+8 (China Standard)

Yongning Township (simplified Chinese: 永宁乡; traditional Chinese: 永寧鄉; pinyin: Yǒngníng Xiāng) is a township under the administration of Ninglang Yi Autonomous County, Yunnan, China. As of 2018, it has six villages under its administration. The town was the capital of the Chiefdom of Yongning.
