= Yitong Manchu Autonomous County =

Yitong County 伊通县 ᡳᡨᠣᠩ ᡥᡳᠶᠠᠨ
- Autonomous county
- 伊通满族自治县 ᡳᡨᠣᠩ ᠮᠠᠨᠵᡠ ᡠᡴᠰᡠᡵᠠ ᠪᡝᠶᡝ ᡩᠠᠰᠠᡵᠠ ᡥᡳᠶᠠᠨ; Yitong Manchu Autonomous County
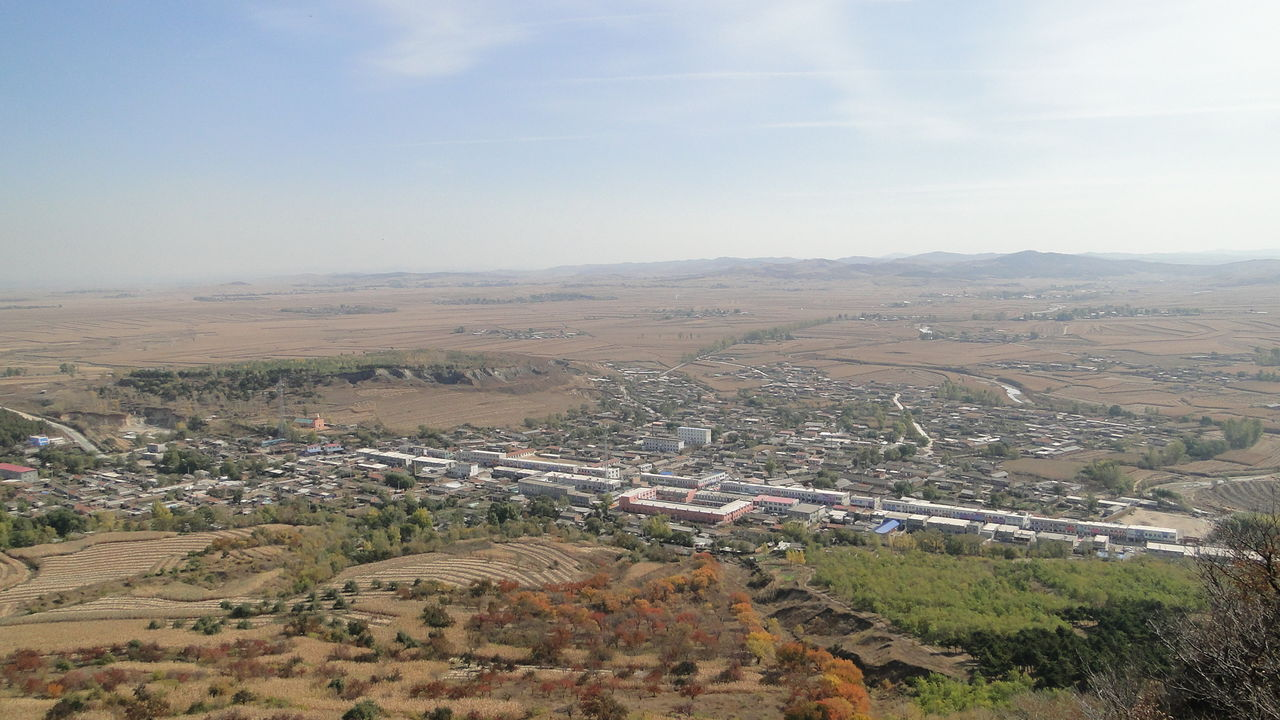

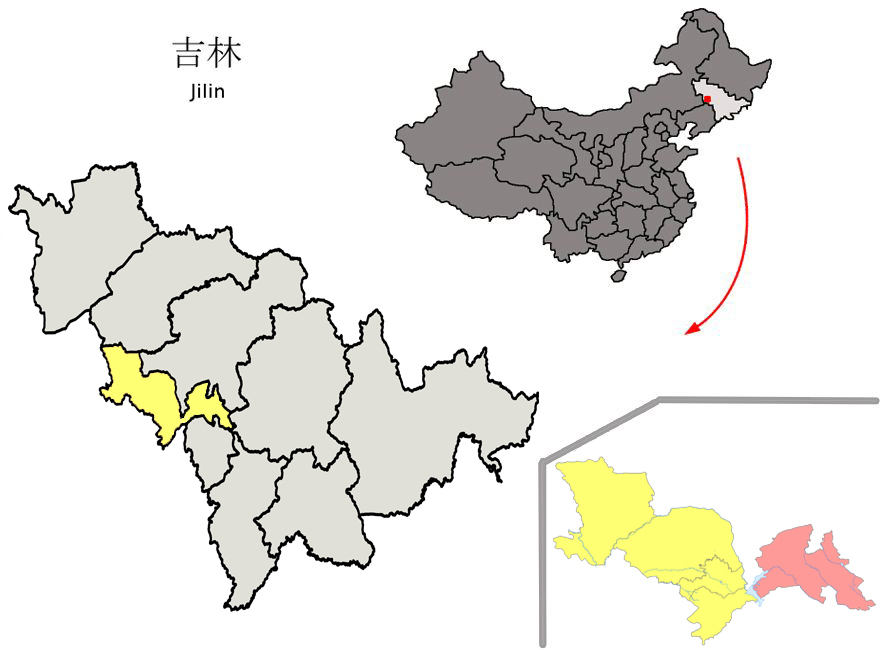
- Location of Yitong County (red) within Siping City (yellow) and Jilin
- Coordinates: 43°20′45″N 125°18′19″E
- Country: China
- Province: Jilin
- Prefecture-level city: Siping
- County seat: Yongning Subdistrict

Area
  - Total: 2,523 km^{2} (974 sq mi)
- Elevation: 242 m (794 ft)

Population (2020 census)
  - Total: 331,873
  - Density: 131.5/km^{2} (340.7/sq mi)
- Time zone: UTC+8 (China Standard)
- Postal code: 130700
- Area code: 0434
- Website: www.yitong.gov.cn

Yitong Manchu Autonomous County (simplified Chinese: 伊通满族自治县; traditional Chinese: 伊通滿族自治縣; pinyin: Yītōng Mǎnzú Zìzhìxiàn, Manchu: ᡳᡨᠣᠩ ᠮᠠᠨᠵᡠ ᡠᡴᠰᡠᡵᠠ ᠪᡝᠶᡝ ᡩᠠᠰᠠᡵᠠ ᡥᡳᠶᠠᠨ; Möllendorff: itong manju uksura beye dasara hiyan), formerly known as Itu (ᡳᡨᡠ, itu), is located in western Jilin province, China, 52 kilometres (32 mi) south of the provincial capital, Changchun. It comes under the administration of Siping City. More than 38% of the population are ethnic Manchus.

Yitong became an autonomous county in 1988.

== Administrative divisions ==
The county administers 2 subdistricts, 12 towns and 3 townships.

Name	Simplified Chinese	Hanyu Pinyin	Manchu	Möllendorff	Administrative division code
Subdistricts
Yongsheng Subdistrict	永盛街道	Yǒngshèng Jiēdào	ᠶᠣᠩ ᡧᡝᠩ ᠵᡠᡤᡡᠨ ᡤᡳᠶᠠ	yong šeng jugūn giya	220323001
Yongning Subdistrict	永宁街道	Yǒngníng Jiēdào	ᠶᠣᠩ ᠨᡳᠩ ᠵᡠᡤᡡᠨ ᡤᡳᠶᠠ	yong ning jugūn giya	220323002
Towns
Yitong Town	伊通镇	Yītōng zhèn	ᡳᡨᠣᠩ ᠵᡝᠨ	itong jen	220323100
Erdao Town	二道镇	Èrdào zhèn	ᡝᠯ ᡩᠣᠣ ᠵᡝᠨ	el doo jen	220323101
Yidan Town	伊丹镇	Yīdān zhèn	ᡳᡩᠠᠨ ᠵᡝᠨ	idan jen	220323102
Ma'an Town	马鞍镇	Mǎ'ān zhèn	ᠮᠠ ᠠᠨ ᡧᠠᠨ ᠠᠯᡳᠨ ᠵᡝᠨ	ma an šan alin jen	220323103
Jingtai Town	景台镇	Jǐngtái zhèn	ᠵᡳᠩ ᡨᠠᡳ ᠵᡝᠨ	jing tai jen	220323104
Kaoshan Town	靠山镇	Kàoshān zhèn	ᡴᠣᠣ ᡧᠠᠨ ᠠᠯᡳᠨ ᠵᡝᠨ	koo šan alin jen	220323105
Dagushan Town	大孤山镇	Dàgūshān zhèn	ᠠᠮᠪᠠ ᡤᠠᡴᡩᠠ ᠠᠯᡳᠨ ᠵᡝᠨ	amba gakda alin jen	220323106
Xiaogushan Town	小孤山镇	Xiǎogūshān zhèn	ᠠᠵᡳᡤᡝ ᡤᠠᡴᡩᠠ ᠠᠯᡳᠨ ᠵᡝᠨ	ajige gakda alin jen	220323107
Yingchengzi Town	营城子镇	Yíngchéngzi zhèn	ᠶᡳᠩ ᠴᡝᠩ ᡯᡳ᠋ ᠵᡝᠨ	ying ceng dzi jen	220323108
Xiwei Town	西苇镇	Xīwěi zhèn	ᠰᡳ ᠸᡝᡳ ᠵᡝᠨ	si wei jen	220323109
Heyuan Town	河源镇	Héyuán zhèn	ᡥᡝ ᠶᠣᠸᠠᠨ ᠵᡝᠨ	he yowan jen	220323110
Huanglingzi Town	黄岭子镇	Huánglǐngzi zhèn	ᡥᡡᠸᠠᠩ ᠯᡳᠩ ᡯᡳ᠋ ᠵᡝᠨ	hūwang ling dzi jen	220323111
Townships
Xinxing Township	新兴乡	Xīnxīng xiāng	ᠰᡳᠨ ᠰᡳᠩ ᡤᠠᡧᠠᠨ	sin sing gašan	220323200
Moliqing Township	莫里青乡	Mòlǐqīng xiāng	ᠮᡝ ᠯᡳ ᠴᡳᠩ ᡤᠠᡧᠠᠨ	me li cing gašan	220323201
Sandao Township	三道乡	Sāndào xiāng	ᠰᠠᠨ ᡩᠣᠣ ᡤᠠᡧᠠᠨ	san doo gašan	220323202

== Climate ==
Climate data for Yitong, elevation 248 m (814 ft), (1991–2020 normals, extremes 1981–present)
Month	Jan	Feb	Mar	Apr	May	Jun	Jul	Aug	Sep	Oct	Nov	Dec	Year
Record high °C (°F)	5.3 (41.5)	14.2 (57.6)	21.2 (70.2)	31.4 (88.5)	34.0 (93.2)	36.8 (98.2)	34.7 (94.5)	35.2 (95.4)	30.6 (87.1)	28.5 (83.3)	21.4 (70.5)	12.3 (54.1)	36.8 (98.2)
Mean daily maximum °C (°F)	−8.5 (16.7)	−3.3 (26.1)	4.7 (40.5)	14.9 (58.8)	22.0 (71.6)	26.5 (79.7)	28.1 (82.6)	27.0 (80.6)	22.4 (72.3)	14.0 (57.2)	2.7 (36.9)	−6.2 (20.8)	12.0 (53.7)
Daily mean °C (°F)	−15.4 (4.3)	−10.3 (13.5)	−1.4 (29.5)	8.3 (46.9)	15.7 (60.3)	20.8 (69.4)	23.3 (73.9)	21.7 (71.1)	15.5 (59.9)	7.2 (45.0)	−3.0 (26.6)	−12.3 (9.9)	5.8 (42.5)
Mean daily minimum °C (°F)	−20.9 (−5.6)	−16.4 (2.5)	−7.0 (19.4)	1.8 (35.2)	9.3 (48.7)	15.4 (59.7)	18.8 (65.8)	17.1 (62.8)	9.6 (49.3)	1.5 (34.7)	−7.9 (17.8)	−17.3 (0.9)	0.3 (32.6)
Record low °C (°F)	−40.6 (−41.1)	−35.0 (−31.0)	−25.3 (−13.5)	−13.9 (7.0)	−4.3 (24.3)	3.0 (37.4)	10.4 (50.7)	5.2 (41.4)	−3.5 (25.7)	−14.7 (5.5)	−26.6 (−15.9)	−35.7 (−32.3)	−40.6 (−41.1)
Average precipitation mm (inches)	5.3 (0.21)	6.8 (0.27)	13.4 (0.53)	26.6 (1.05)	58.1 (2.29)	96.9 (3.81)	160.3 (6.31)	162.9 (6.41)	56.8 (2.24)	28.6 (1.13)	17.9 (0.70)	7.8 (0.31)	641.4 (25.26)
Average precipitation days (≥ 0.1 mm)	5.5	4.3	5.8	7.0	11.1	14.3	14.4	12.7	8.5	7.5	6.9	6.5	104.5
Average snowy days	7.6	6.1	7.1	2.5	0.1	0	0	0	0	1.8	6.6	8.0	39.8
Average relative humidity (%)	69	63	58	50	56	68	80	82	74	65	67	69	67
Mean monthly sunshine hours	192.9	205.5	238.9	237.1	260.0	244.9	232.1	229.5	240.2	214.8	175.3	172.6	2,643.8
Percentage possible sunshine	66	69	64	59	57	53	50	54	65	64	61	62	60
Source: China Meteorological Administration All-time Oct extreme
