= Ninglang Yi Autonomous County =

Ninglang County 宁蒗县 · ꆀꆿꑤ
- Autonomous county
- 宁蒗彝族自治县 ꆀꆿꆈꌠꊨꏦꏱꅉꑤ; Ninglang Yi Autonomous County
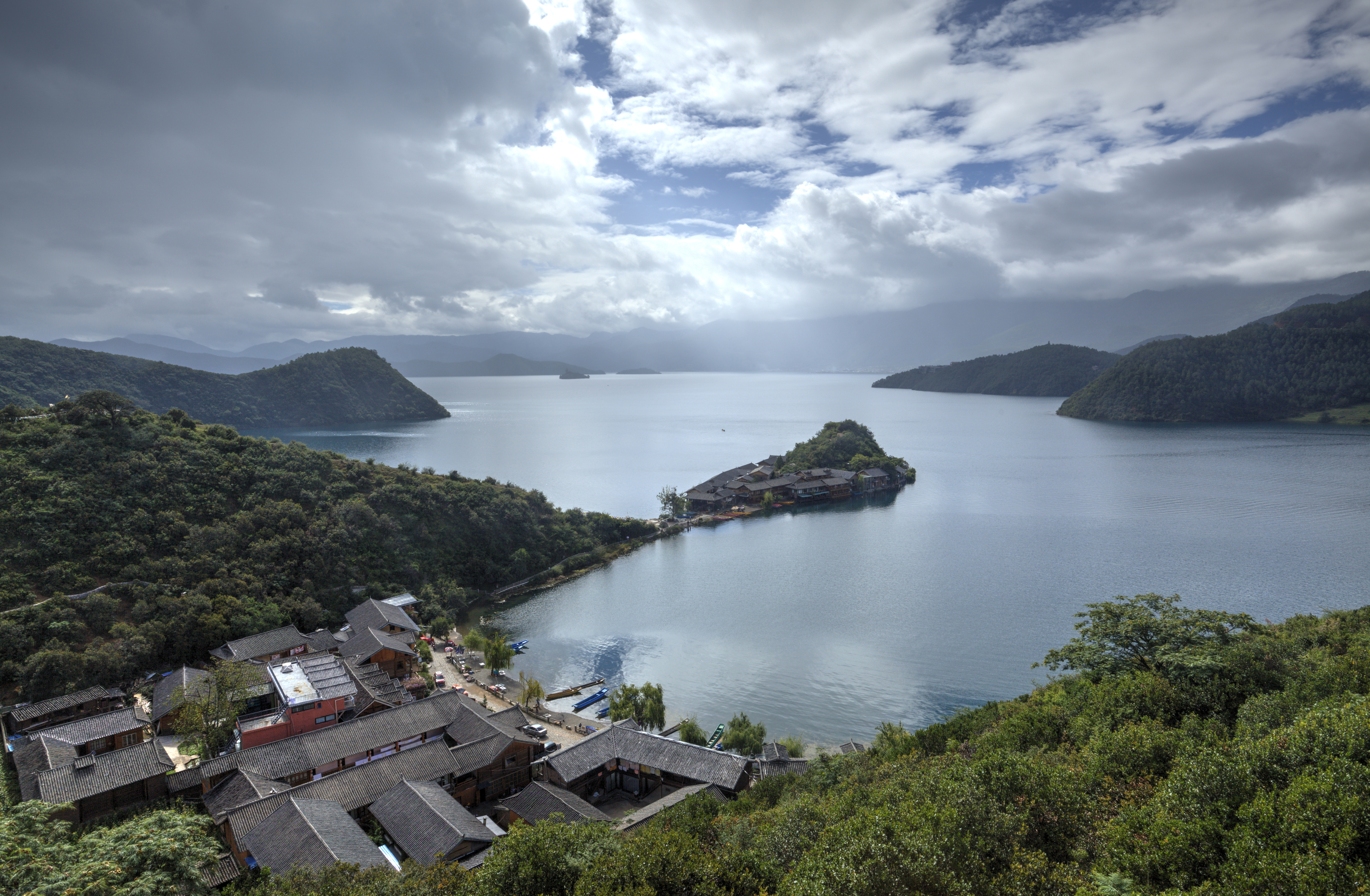
- Lugu Lake

- Location of Ninglang County (red) and Lijiang City (pink) within Yunnan

- Location within China Ninglang County (China)
- Coordinates: 27°17′02″N 100°51′36″E
- Country: China
- Province: Yunnan
- Prefecture-level city: Lijiang
- County seat: Daxing

Area
  - Total: 6,206 km^{2} (2,396 sq mi)

Population (2020 census)
  - Total: 244,525
  - Density: 39.40/km^{2} (102.0/sq mi)
- Time zone: UTC+8 (CST)
- Postal code: 674300
- Area code: 0888
- Climate: Cwb
- Website: www.ynnl.gov.cn

Ninglang Yi Autonomous County (simplified Chinese: 宁蒗彝族自治县; traditional Chinese: 寧蒗彝族自治縣; pinyin: Nínglàng Yízú Zìzhìxiàn; Yi: ꆀꆿꆈꌠꊨꏦꏱꅉꑤ, nip lat nuo su zyt jie jux dde xiep) is located in the northwest of Yunnan province, China, bordering Sichuan province to the north, east and northeast. It is under the administration of Lijiang City. The county is home to the Mosuo people, who lived under the quasi-independent Chiefdom of Yongning until abolished in 1956. Ninglang Luguhu Airport is located in the county.

== Geography ==
Ninglang County is located in the northwest of Yunnan and borders Yanbian County and Yanyuan County to the east and northeast, Yongsheng County and Huaping County to the south and southeast, Gucheng District to the southwest, Yulong County to the west and Muli County of Sichuan to the north.

== Administrative divisions ==
Ninglang Yi Autonomous County has 2 subdistricts, 3 towns, 10 townships and 1 ethnic township.

2 subdistricts

- Daxing Subdistrict (大兴街道)
- Zima Subdistrict (紫玛街道)

4 towns

- Yongning (永宁镇)
- Hongqiao (红桥镇)
- Zhanhe (战河镇)

10 townships

- Labo (拉伯乡)
- Ningli (宁利乡)
- Jinmian (金棉乡)
- Xichuan (西川乡)
- Xibuhe (西布河乡)
- Yongningping (永宁坪乡)
- Paomaping (跑马坪乡)
- Chanzhanhe (蝉战河乡)
- Xinyingpan (新营盘乡)
- Lanniqing (烂泥箐乡)

1 ethnic township

- Cuiyu Lisu and Pumi Ethnic Township (翠玉傈僳族普米族乡)

== Climate ==
Climate data for Ninglang, elevation 2,241 m (7,352 ft), (1991–2020 normals, extremes 1981–present)
Month	Jan	Feb	Mar	Apr	May	Jun	Jul	Aug	Sep	Oct	Nov	Dec	Year
Record high °C (°F)	24.6 (76.3)	26.7 (80.1)	27.8 (82.0)	30.0 (86.0)	31.4 (88.5)	30.8 (87.4)	32.5 (90.5)	30.6 (87.1)	29.9 (85.8)	28.4 (83.1)	25.3 (77.5)	23.8 (74.8)	32.5 (90.5)
Mean daily maximum °C (°F)	15.5 (59.9)	17.6 (63.7)	20.2 (68.4)	23.2 (73.8)	24.8 (76.6)	25.3 (77.5)	24.7 (76.5)	24.6 (76.3)	23.5 (74.3)	21.6 (70.9)	18.2 (64.8)	15.7 (60.3)	21.2 (70.2)
Daily mean °C (°F)	4.1 (39.4)	6.5 (43.7)	9.8 (49.6)	13.3 (55.9)	17.2 (63.0)	19.4 (66.9)	19.1 (66.4)	18.5 (65.3)	16.9 (62.4)	13.5 (56.3)	8.3 (46.9)	4.5 (40.1)	12.6 (54.7)
Mean daily minimum °C (°F)	−4.9 (23.2)	−2.9 (26.8)	0.6 (33.1)	4.3 (39.7)	10.3 (50.5)	14.7 (58.5)	15.5 (59.9)	14.7 (58.5)	13.1 (55.6)	8.1 (46.6)	1.4 (34.5)	−3.5 (25.7)	5.9 (42.7)
Record low °C (°F)	−9.7 (14.5)	−9.2 (15.4)	−6.6 (20.1)	−2.5 (27.5)	2.7 (36.9)	8.5 (47.3)	8.9 (48.0)	8.7 (47.7)	2.2 (36.0)	−0.9 (30.4)	−5.7 (21.7)	−8.4 (16.9)	−9.7 (14.5)
Average precipitation mm (inches)	4.7 (0.19)	3.7 (0.15)	9.6 (0.38)	18.5 (0.73)	62.8 (2.47)	160.5 (6.32)	244.5 (9.63)	200.5 (7.89)	138.1 (5.44)	47.8 (1.88)	12.1 (0.48)	1.7 (0.07)	904.5 (35.63)
Average precipitation days (≥ 0.1 mm)	2.0	2.3	3.5	5.4	11.5	17.1	23.0	21.8	18.3	10.1	3.5	1.2	119.7
Average snowy days	0.9	0.4	0.3	0	0	0	0	0	0	0	0.3	0.3	2.2
Average relative humidity (%)	60	55	54	56	62	74	82	83	82	78	74	68	69
Mean monthly sunshine hours	248.5	235.3	249.3	242.9	217.4	163.3	129.3	136.1	131.5	184.6	210.5	239.2	2,387.9
Percentage possible sunshine	75	74	67	63	52	40	31	34	36	52	66	74	55
Source: China Meteorological Administration All-time October high
