= Cavefish =

Fish adapted to life in caves

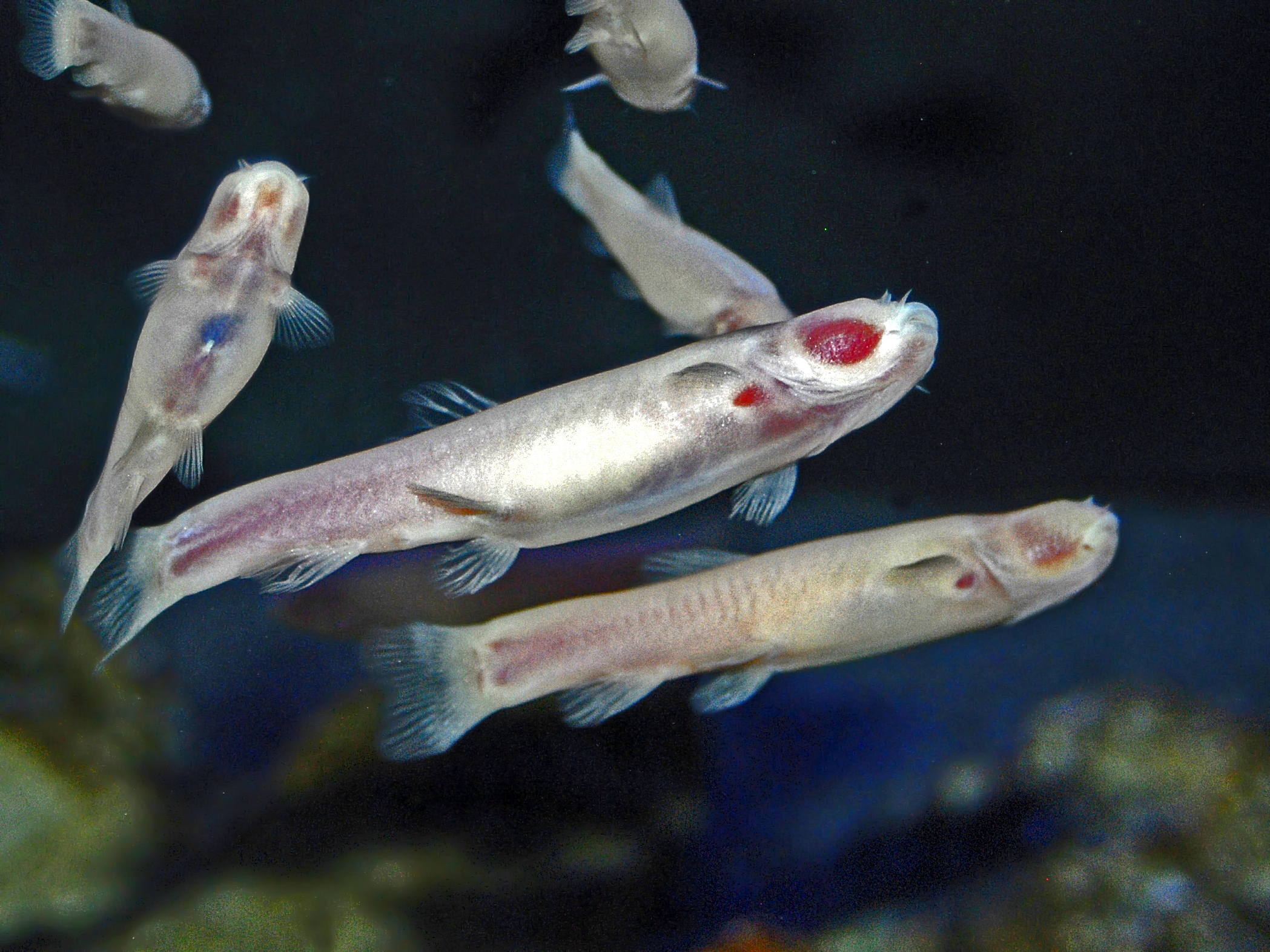
Garra andruzzii showing the pale colour and lack of eyes typical of cavefish. The large red spot on the head is the blood-filled gills, visible through the semi-transparent gill cover

Cavefish or cave fish is a generic term for fresh and brackish water fish adapted to life in caves and other underground habitats. Related terms are subterranean fish, troglomorphic fish, troglobitic fish, stygobitic fish, phreatic fish, and hypogean fish.

There are more than 200 scientifically described species of obligate cavefish found on all continents, except Antarctica. Although widespread as a group, many species have very small ranges and are threatened.

Cavefish are members of a wide range of families and do not form a monophyletic group. Typical adaptations include reduced eyes and depigmentation.

== Adaptations ==
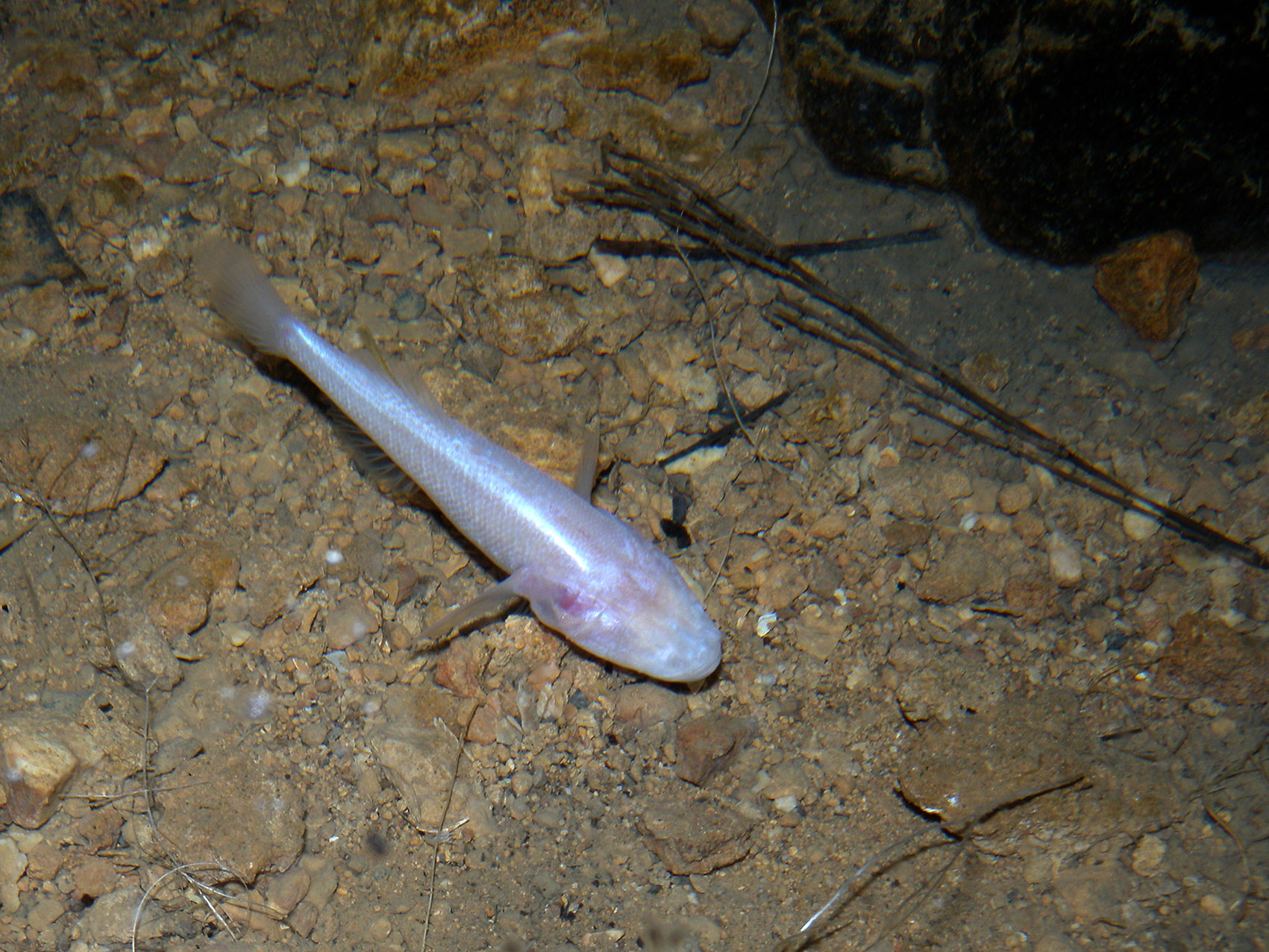
As typical of cavefish, Typhleotris madagascariensis is an opportunistic feeder on various invertebrates

Many aboveground fish may enter caves on occasion, but obligate cavefish (fish that require underground habitats) are extremophiles with a number of unusual adaptations known as troglomorphism. In some species, notably the Mexican tetra, shortfin molly, Oman garra, Indoreonectes evezardi, and a few catfish, both "normal" aboveground and cavefish forms exist.

Many adaptations seen in cavefish are aimed at surviving in a habitat with little food. Living in darkness, pigmentation and eyes are useless, or an actual disadvantage because of their energy requirements, and therefore typically reduced in cavefish. Other examples of adaptations are larger fins for more energy-efficient swimming, and a loss of scales and swim bladder. The loss can be complete or only partial, for example resulting in small or incomplete (but still existing) eyes, and eyes can be present in the earliest life stages but degenerated by the adult stage. In some cases, "blind" cavefish may still be able to see: Juvenile Mexican tetras of the cave form are able to sense light via certain cells in the pineal gland (pineal eye), and Congo blind barbs are photophobic, despite only having retinas and optical nerves that are rudimentary and located deep inside the head, and completely lacking a lens. In the most extreme cases, the lack of light has changed the circadian rhythm (24-hour internal body clock) of the cavefish. In the Mexican tetra of the cave form and in Garra andruzzii the circadian rhythm lasts 30 hours and 47 hours, respectively. This may help them to save energy. Without sight, other senses are used and these may be enhanced. Examples include the lateral line for sensing vibrations, mouth suction to sense nearby obstacles (comparable to echolocation), and chemoreception (via smell and taste buds). Although there are cavefish in groups known to have electroreception (catfish and South American knifefish), there is no published evidence that this is enhanced in the cave-dwellers. The level of specialized adaptations in a cavefish is generally considered to be directly correlated to the amount of time it has been restricted to the underground habitat: Species that recently arrived show few adaptations and species with the largest number of adaptations are likely the ones that have been restricted to the habitat for the longest time.

Recent genomic studies on Chinese cavefish (Sinocyclocheilus) have highlighted the role of polyploidy in facilitating these adaptations. For example, in the allotetraploid species Sinocyclocheilus microphthalmus, duplicated gene sets allow for different evolutionary trajectories; one set of genes may retain essential functions while the other accumulates mutations that drive adaptation to darkness, such as relaxed selection on visual pathways.

Some fish species that live buried in the bottom of aboveground waters, live deep in the sea or live in deep rivers have adaptations similar to cavefish, including reduced eyes and pigmentation.

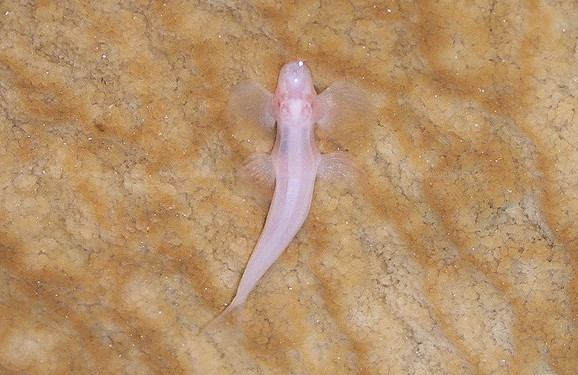
The waterfall climbing cavefish has several adaptations that allow it to climb and "walk" in a tetrapod-like fashion

Cavefish are quite small, with most species being between 2 and 13 cm (0.8–5.1 in) in standard length and about a dozen species reaching 20–23 cm (8–9 in). Only three species grow larger: two slender Ophisternon swamp eels at up to 32–36 cm (13–14 in) in standard length and a much more robust undescribed species of mahseer at 43 cm (17 in). The very limited food resources in the habitat likely prevents larger cavefish species from existing and also means that cavefish in general are opportunistic feeders, taking whatever is available. In their habitat, cavefish are often the top predators, feeding on smaller cave-living invertebrates, or are detritivores without enemies. Cavefish typically have low metabolic rates and may be able to survive long periods of starvation. A captive Phreatobius cisternarum did not feed for a year, but remained in good condition. The cave form of the Mexican tetra can build up unusually large fat reserves by "binge eating" in periods where food is available, which then (together with its low metabolic rate) allows it to survive without food for months, much longer than the aboveground form of the species.

In the dark habitat, certain types of displays are reduced in cavefish, but in other cases they have become stronger, shifting from displays that are aimed at being seen to displays aimed at being felt via water movement. For example, during the courtship of the cave form of the Mexican tetra the pair produce turbulence through exaggerated gill and mouth movements, allowing them to detect each other. In general, cavefish are slow growers and slow breeders. Breeding behaviors among cavefish vary extensively, and there are both species that are egg-layers and ovoviviparous species that give birth to live young. Uniquely among fish, the genus Amblyopsis brood their eggs in the gill chambers (somewhat like mouthbrooders).

== Habitat ==
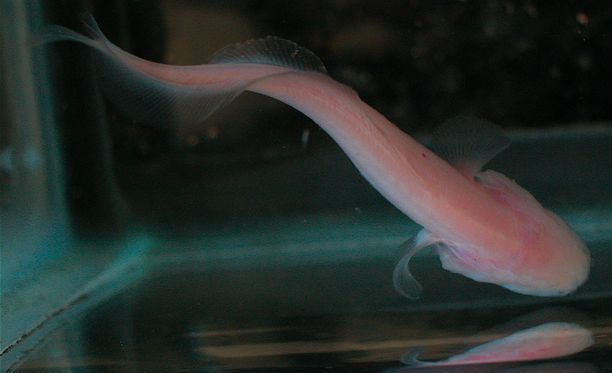
The Mexican blind brotula and other cave-dwelling brotulas are among the few species that live in anchialine habitats

Although many cavefish species are restricted to underground lakes, pools, or rivers in actual caves, some are found in aquifers and may only be detected by humans when artificial wells are dug into this layer. Most live in areas with low (essentially static) or moderate water current, but there are also species in places with very strong current, such as the waterfall climbing cavefish. Underground waters are often very stable environments with limited variations in temperature (typically near the annual average of the surrounding region), nutrient levels and other factors. Organic compounds generally only occur in low levels and rely on outside sources, such as contained in water that enters the underground habitat from outside, aboveground animals that find their way into caves (deliberately or by mistake) and guano from bats that roost in caves. Cavefish are primarily restricted to freshwater. A few species, notably the cave-dwelling viviparous brotulas, Luciogobius gobies, Milyeringa sleeper gobies and the blind cave eel, live in anchialine caves and several of these tolerate various salinities.

== Range and diversity ==
The more than 200 scientifically described obligate cavefish species are found in most continents, but there are strong geographic patterns and the species richness varies. The vast majority of species are found in the tropics or subtropics. Cavefish are strongly linked to regions with karst, which commonly result in underground sinkholes and subterranean rivers.

With more than 120 described species, by far the greatest diversity is in Asia, followed by more than 30 species in South America and about 30 species in North America. In contrast, only 9 species are known from Africa, 5 from Oceania, and 1 from Europe. On a country level, China has the greatest diversity with more than 80 species, followed by Brazil with more than 20 species. India, Mexico, Thailand and the United States of America each have 9–14 species. No other country has more than 5 cavefish species.

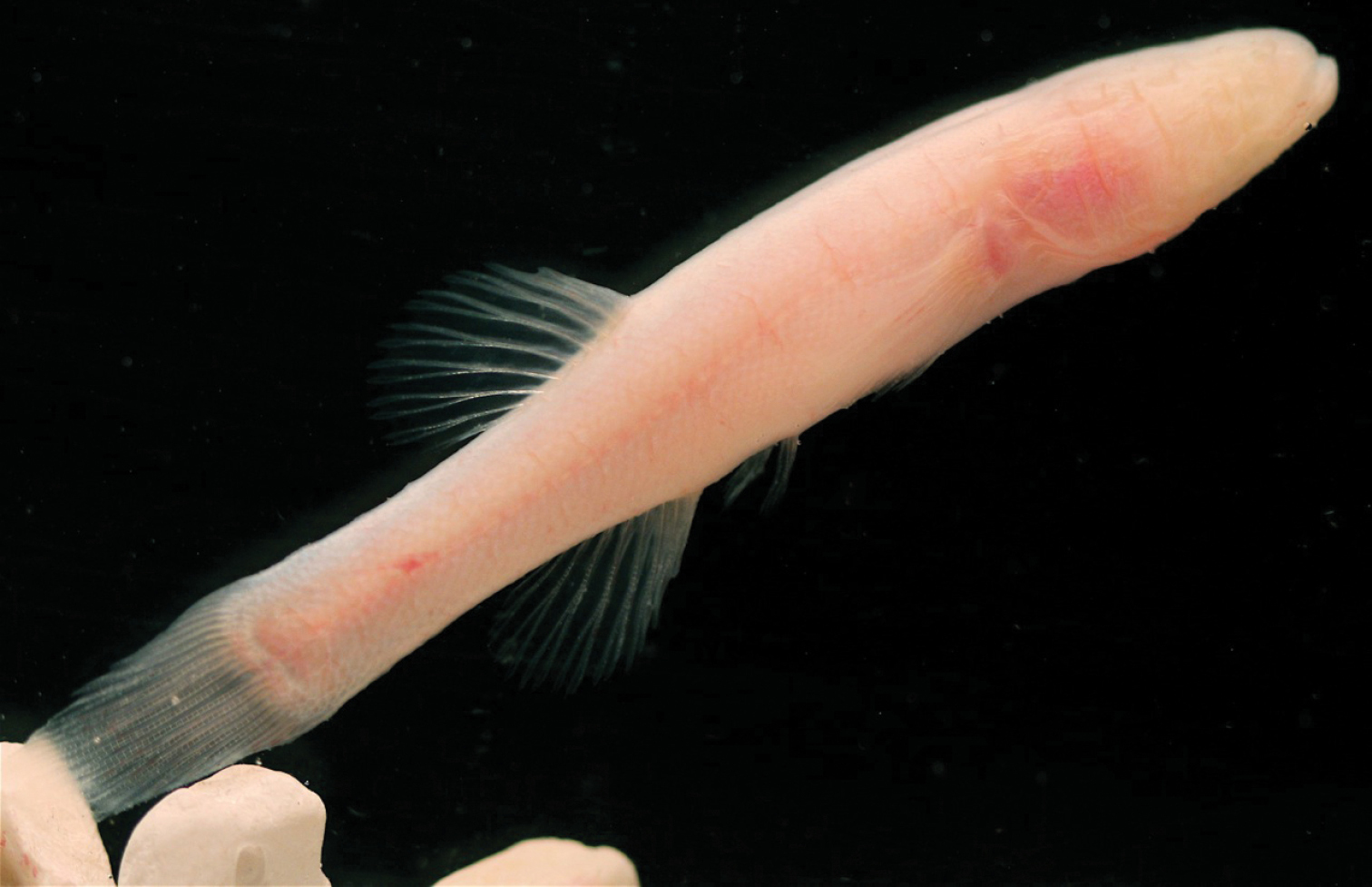
The Hoosier cavefish from Indiana in the United States was only described in 2014

Being underground, many places where cavefish may live have not been thoroughly surveyed. New cavefish species are described with some regularity and undescribed species are known. As a consequence, the number of known cavefish species has risen rapidly in recent decades. In the early 1990s only about 50 species were known, in 2010 about 170 species were known, and by 2015 this had surpassed 200 species. It has been estimated that the final number might be around 250 obligate cavefish species. For example, the first cavefish in Europe, a Barbatula stone loach, was only discovered in 2015 in Southern Germany, and the largest known cavefish, Neolissochilus pnar (originally thought to be a form of the golden mahseer), was only definitely confirmed in 2019, despite being quite numerous in the cave where it occurs in Meghalaya, India. Conversely, their unusual appearance means that some cavefish already attracted attention in ancient times. The oldest known description of an obligate cavefish, involving Sinocyclocheilus hyalinus, is almost 500 years old.

Obligate cavefish are known from a wide range of families: Characidae (characids), Balitoridae (hillstream loaches), Cobitidae (true loaches), Cyprinidae (carps and allies), Nemacheilidae (stone loaches), Amblycipitidae (torrent catfishes), Astroblepidae (naked sucker-mouth catfishes), Callichthyidae (armored catfishes), Clariidae (airbreathing catfishes), Heptapteridae (heptapterid catfishes), Ictaluridae (ictalurid catfishes), Kryptoglanidae (kryptoglanid catfish), Loricariidae (loricariid catfishes), Phreatobiidae (phreatobiid catfishes), Trichomycteridae (pencil catfishes), Sternopygidae (glass knifefishes), Amblyopsidae (U.S. cavefishes), Bythitidae (brotulas), Poeciliidae (live-bearers), Synbranchidae (swamp eels), Cottidae (true sculpins), Butidae (butid gobies), Eleotridae (sleeper gobies), Milyeringidae (blind cave gobies), Gobiidae (gobies) and Channidae (snakeheads). Many of these families are only very distantly related and do not form a monophyletic group, showing that adaptations to a life in caves has happened numerous times among fish. As such, their similar adaptations are examples of convergent evolution and the descriptive term "cavefish" is an example of folk taxonomy rather than scientific taxonomy. Strictly speaking some Cyprinodontidae (pupfish) are also known from sinkhole caves, famously including the Devils Hole pupfish, but these lack the adaptations (e.g., reduced eyes and pigmentation) typically associated with cavefish. Additionally, species from a few families such as Chaudhuriidae (earthworm eels), Glanapteryginae and Sarcoglanidinae live buried in the bottom of aboveground waters, and can show adaptations similar to traditional underground-living (troglobitic) fish. It has been argued that such species should be recognized as a part of the group of troglobitic fish.

=== Species ===
As of 2019, the following underground-living fish species with various levels of troglomorphism (ranging from complete loss of eyes and pigment, to only a partial reduction of one of these) are known. Phreatobius sanguijuela and Prietella phreatophila, the only species with underground populations in more than one country, are listed twice. Excluded from the table are species that live buried in the bottom of aboveground waters (even if they have troglomorphic-like features) and undescribed species.

Family	Species	Country	Year of description	Notes
Characidae	Astyanax aeneus	Mexico	1860	Species includes both aboveground and belowground forms (aboveground also in Central America). Sometimes considered a part of Astyanax mexicanus
Characidae	Astyanax mexicanus (blind cave tetra)	Mexico	1853	Species includes both aboveground and belowground forms (aboveground also in United States). Cave form sometimes considered a separate species, A. jordani
Characidae	Stygichthys typhlops (Brazilian blind characid)	Brazil	1965	
Cyprinidae	Anchicyclocheilus halfibindus	China	1992	Sometimes considered a species in the genus Sinocyclocheilus, or a synonym of Sinocyclocheilus microphthalmus
Cyprinidae	Barbodes microps	Indonesia	1868	Formerly placed in Barbus or Puntius instead. Aboveground populations have also been assigned to this species, but its taxonomy is unresolved and a review has suggested that at least some of the underground populations might belong to Puntius binotatus or an undescribed species instead.
Cyprinidae	Barbopsis devecchi (Somalian blind barb)	Somalia	1926	
Cyprinidae	Caecobarbus geertsii (Congo blind barb)	DR Congo	1921	
Cyprinidae	Caecocypris basimi (Haditha cavefish)	Iraq	1980	
Cyprinidae	Garra barreimiae (Omani blind cavefish)	Oman	1956	Species includes both aboveground and belowground forms (aboveground also in the United Arab Emirates). A population in the United Arab Emirates has been reported to be underground, but this is incorrect
Cyprinidae	Garra dunsirei (Tawi Atair garra)	Oman	1987	
Cyprinidae	Garra lorestanensis	Iran	2016	
Cyprinidae	Garra tashanensis	Iran	2016	
Cyprinidae	Garra typhlops (Iran cave barb)	Iran	1944	Formerly in its own genus Iranocypris
Cyprinidae	Garra widdowsoni (Iraq blind barb)	Iraq	1955	Formerly in its own genus Typhlogarra, but genetics show that it belongs in Garra
Cyprinidae	Longanalus macrochirous	China	2006	
Cyprinidae	Neolissochilus pnar	India	2023	Originally tentatively identified as a troglobitic form of the golden mahseer.
Cyprinidae	Neolissochilus subterraneus	Thailand	2003	
Cyprinidae	Garra andruzzii	Somalia	1924	Originally described in the monotypic genus Phreatichthys
Cyprinidae	Poropuntius speleops	Thailand	1991	
Cyprinidae	Sinocyclocheilus albeoguttatus	China	1998	
Cyprinidae	Sinocyclocheilus altishoulderus	China	1992	
Cyprinidae	Sinocyclocheilus aluensis	China	2005	
Cyprinidae	Sinocyclocheilus anatirostris (duck-billed golden-line fish)	China	1986	
Cyprinidae	Sinocyclocheilus angularis (gold-colored angle fish)	China	1990	
Cyprinidae	Sinocyclocheilus anophthalmus (eyeless golden-line fish)	China	1988	
Cyprinidae	Sinocyclocheilus anshuiensis	China	2013	
Cyprinidae	Sinocyclocheilus aquihornes	China	2007	
Cyprinidae	Sinocyclocheilus biangularis	China	1996	
Cyprinidae	Sinocyclocheilus bicornutus	China	1997	
Cyprinidae	Sinocyclocheilus brevibarbatus	China	2009	
Cyprinidae	Sinocyclocheilus broadihornes	China	2007	
Cyprinidae	Sinocyclocheilus cyphotergous	China	1988	
Cyprinidae	Sinocyclocheilus flexuosdorsalis	China	2012	
Cyprinidae	Sinocyclocheilus furcodorsalis (crossed-fork back golden-line fish)	China	1997	
Cyprinidae	Sinocyclocheilus guanyangensis	China	2016	
Cyprinidae	Sinocyclocheilus huanjiangensis	China	2010	
Cyprinidae	Sinocyclocheilus hugeibarbus	China	2003	
Cyprinidae	Sinocyclocheilus hyalinus (hyaline fish)	China	1993	
Cyprinidae	Sinocyclocheilus jinxiensis	China	2012	Proposed moved to monotypic genus Pseudosinocyclocheilus in 2016
Cyprinidae	Sinocyclocheilus jiuxuensis	China	2003	
Cyprinidae	Sinocyclocheilus lingyunensis	China	2000	
Cyprinidae	Sinocyclocheilus longibarbatus	China	1989	
Cyprinidae	Sinocyclocheilus longifinus	China	1996	
Cyprinidae	Sinocyclocheilus luolouensis	China	2013	
Cyprinidae	Sinocyclocheilus luopingensis	China	2002	
Cyprinidae	Sinocyclocheilus macrophthalmus	China	2001	
Cyprinidae	Sinocyclocheilus macroscalus	China	2000	
Cyprinidae	Sinocyclocheilus maculatus	China	2000	
Cyprinidae	Sinocyclocheilus maitianheensis	China	1992	
Cyprinidae	Sinocyclocheilus malacopterus	China	1985	
Cyprinidae	Sinocyclocheilus mashanensis	China	2010	
Cyprinidae	Sinocyclocheilus microphthalmus (small eye golden-line fish)	China	1989	
Cyprinidae	Sinocyclocheilus multipunctatus	China	1931	
Cyprinidae	Sinocyclocheilus oxycephalus	China	1985	
Cyprinidae	Sinocyclocheilus purpureus	China	1985	
Cyprinidae	Sinocyclocheilus qiubeiensis	China	2002	
Cyprinidae	Sinocyclocheilus rhinocerous	China	1994	
Cyprinidae	Sinocyclocheilus robustus	China	1988	
Cyprinidae	Sinocyclocheilus tianeensis	China	2003	
Cyprinidae	Sinocyclocheilus tianlinensis	China	2004	
Cyprinidae	Sinocyclocheilus tileihornes	China	2003	
Cyprinidae	Sinocyclocheilus xunlensis	China	2004	
Cyprinidae	Sinocyclocheilus yishanensis	China	1992	
Cyprinidae	Speolabeo hokhanhi	Vietnam	2018	
Cyprinidae	Speolabeo musaei	Laos	2011	Formerly in genus Bangana
Cyprinidae	Troglocyclocheilus khammouanensis	Laos	1999	
Cyprinidae	Typhlobarbus nudiventris	China	1982	
Balitoridae	Cryptotora thamicola (waterfall climbing cavefish)	Thailand	1988	
Cobitidae	Bibarba parvoculus	China	2015	
Cobitidae	Cobitis damlae	Turkey	2014	First described as a species of cavefish based on a single specimen, but a later review suggested that it was found in an area without underground waters and only is an albinistic individual of the aboveground Cobitis fahireae
Cobitidae	Pangio bhujia (Cave kuhli loach)	India	2019	
Cobitidae	Protocobitis anteroventris	China	2013	
Cobitidae	Protocobitis polylepis	China	2008	
Cobitidae	Protocobitis typhlops	China	1993	
Nemacheilidae	Barbatula barbatula (stone loach)	Germany	1758	Aboveground populations widespread in Europe. Belowground population only discovered in 2015 and tentatively included in this species based on genetic evidence. Only known cavefish in Europe
Nemacheilidae	Claea dabryi	China	1874	Traditionally in genus Schistura or Triplophysa. Species includes both aboveground and belowground populations; the latter sometimes recognized as a separate subspecies microphthalmus.
Nemacheilidae	Draconectes narinosus	Vietnam	2012	
Nemacheilidae	Eidinemacheilus proudlovei	Iraq	2016	
Nemacheilidae	Eidinemacheilus smithi (Zagroz blind loach)	Iran	1976	Formerly in genus Noemacheilus or Paracobitis
Nemacheilidae	Indoreonectes evezardi	India	1872	Species includes both aboveground and belowground forms
Nemacheilidae	Karstsinnectes acridorsalis	China	2013	
Nemacheilidae	Karstsinnectes anophthalmus	China	1981	
Nemacheilidae	Karstsinnectes hyalinus	China	1996	
Nemacheilidae	Nemacheilus troglocataractus (blind cave loach)	Thailand	1989	
Nemacheilidae	Oreonectes guananensis	China	2011	
Nemacheilidae	Oreonectes luochengensis	China	2011	
Nemacheilidae	Paracobitis starostini (Starostin's loach)	Turkmenistan	1983	
Nemacheilidae	Schistura deansmarti	Thailand	2003	
Nemacheilidae	Schistura jarutanini	Thailand	1990	
Nemacheilidae	Schistura kaysonei	Laos	2002	
Nemacheilidae	Schistura larketensis	India	2017	
Nemacheilidae	Schistura lingyunensis	China	1997	Sometimes in genus Triplophysa
Nemacheilidae	Schistura mobbsi	Vietnam	2012	
Nemacheilidae	Schistura oedipus	Thailand	1988	
Nemacheilidae	Schistura papulifera	India	2007	
Nemacheilidae	Schistura sijuensis	India	1987	
Nemacheilidae	Schistura spekuli	Vietnam	2004	
Nemacheilidae	Schistura spiesi	Thailand	2003	
Nemacheilidae	Speonectes tiomanensis	Malaysia	1990	Formerly in genus Sundoreonectes
Nemacheilidae	Triplophysa aluensis	China	2000	
Nemacheilidae	Triplophysa fengshanensis	China	2013	
Nemacheilidae	Triplophysa gejiuensis	China	1979	
Nemacheilidae	Triplophysa jiarongensis	China	2012	
Nemacheilidae	Triplophysa langpingensis	China	2013	
Nemacheilidae	Triplophysa lihuensis	China	2012	
Nemacheilidae	Triplophysa luochengensis	China	2017	
Nemacheilidae	Triplophysa macrocephala	China	2011	
Nemacheilidae	Triplophysa qiubeiensis	China	2008	
Nemacheilidae	Triplophysa rosa	China	2005	
Nemacheilidae	Triplophysa shilinensis	China	1992	
Nemacheilidae	Triplophysa tianeensis	China	2004	
Nemacheilidae	Triplophysa xiangshuingensis	China	2004	
Nemacheilidae	Triplophysa xiangxiensis	China	1986	
Nemacheilidae	Triplophysa yunnanensis	China	1990	
Nemacheilidae	Troglonectes barbatus	China	2013	
Nemacheilidae	Troglonectes daqikongensis	China	2016	
Nemacheilidae	Troglonectes dongganensis	China	2013	
Nemacheilidae	Troglonectes donglanensis	China	2013	
Nemacheilidae	Troglonectes duanensis	China	2013	
Nemacheilidae	Troglonectes elongatus	China	2012	
Nemacheilidae	Troglonectes furcocaudalis	China	1987	
Nemacheilidae	Troglonectes huanjiangensis	China	2011	
Nemacheilidae	Troglonectes longibarbatus	China	1998	Included Paracobitis maolanensis and P. posterodorsalus as synonyms, which may be valid species
Nemacheilidae	Troglonectes macrolepis	China	2009	
Nemacheilidae	Troglonectes microphthalmus	China	2008	
Nemacheilidae	Troglonectes shuilongensis	China	2016	
Nemacheilidae	Troglonectes translucens	China	2006	
Amblycipitidae	Proliobagrus dorsalis	China	2014	
Astroblepidae	Astroblepus pholeter	Ecuador	1962	
Astroblepidae	Astroblepus riberae	Peru	1994	
Callichthyidae	Aspidoras mephisto	Brazil	2017	Formerly included in aboveground species A. albater
Clariidae	Clarias cavernicola (golden cave catfish)	Angola	1936	
Clariidae	Horaglanis abdulkalami	India	2012	
Clariidae	Horaglanis alikunhii	India	2004	
Clariidae	Horaglanis krishnai (Indian blind catfish)	India	1950	
Clariidae	Uegitglanis zammaranoi	Somalia	1923	
Heptapteridae	Pimelodella kronei	Brazil	1907	
Heptapteridae	Pimelodella spelaea	Brazil	2004	
Heptapteridae	Rhamdia enfurnada	Brazil	2005	
Heptapteridae	Rhamdia guasarensis	Venezuela	2004	
Heptapteridae	Rhamdia laluchensis (La Lucha blind catfish)	Mexico	2003	
Heptapteridae	Rhamdia laticauda typhla	Belize	1982	Other subspecies found in aboveground habitats in Mexico and Central America
Heptapteridae	Rhamdia macuspanensis (Olmec blind catfish)	Mexico	1998	
Heptapteridae	Rhamdia quelen urichi	Trinidad	1926	Other subspecies found widely in aboveground habitats in South and Central America
Heptapteridae	Rhamdia reddelli (blind whiskered catfish)	Mexico	1984	
Heptapteridae	Rhamdia zongolicensis (Zongolica catfish)	Mexico	1993	
Heptapteridae	Rhamdiopsis krugi	Brazil	2010	
Ictaluridae	Prietella lundbergi (phantom blindcat)	Mexico	1995	
Ictaluridae	Prietella phreatophila (Mexican blindcat)	Mexico	1954	Listed twice (once for each country)
Ictaluridae	Prietella phreatophila (Mexican blindcat)	United States	1954	Listed twice (once for each country)
Ictaluridae	Satan eurystomus (widemouth blindcat)	United States	1947	
Ictaluridae	Trogloglanis pattersoni (toothless blindcat)	United States	1919	
Kryptoglanidae	Kryptoglanis shajii	India	2011	Found both underground and aboveground (not known to differ in appearance)
Loricariidae	Ancistrus cryptophthalmus	Brazil	1987	
Loricariidae	Ancistrus formoso	Brazil	1997	
Loricariidae	Ancistrus galani	Venezuela	1994	
Phreatobiidae	Phreatobius cisternarum	Brazil	1905	
Phreatobiidae	Phreatobius dracunculus	Brazil	2007	
Phreatobiidae	Phreatobius sanguijuela	Bolivia	2007	Listed twice (once for each country)
Phreatobiidae	Phreatobius sanguijuela	Brazil	2007	Listed twice (once for each country)
Siluridae	Pterocryptis buccata (cave sheatfish)	Thailand	1998	Species includes both aboveground and belowground forms
Siluridae	Pterocryptis cucphuongensis	Vietnam	1978	
Trichomycteridae	Glaphyropoma spinosum	Brazil	2008	
Trichomycteridae	Ituglanis bambui	Brazil	2004	
Trichomycteridae	Ituglanis boticario	Brazil	2015	
Trichomycteridae	Ituglanis epikarsticus	Brazil	2004	
Trichomycteridae	Ituglanis mambai	Brazil	2008	
Trichomycteridae	Ituglanis passensis	Brazil	2002	
Trichomycteridae	Ituglanis ramiroi	Brazil	2004	
Trichomycteridae	Silvinichthys bortayro	Argentina	2005	
Trichomycteridae	Trichomycterus dali	Brazil	2011	
Trichomycteridae	Trichomycterus chaberti	Bolivia	1968	
Trichomycteridae	Trichomycterus itacarambiensis	Brazil	1996	
Trichomycteridae	Trichomycterus rosablanca	Colombia	2018	
Trichomycteridae	Trichomycterus rubbioli	Brazil	2012	
Trichomycteridae	Trichomycterus sandovali	Colombia	2006	
Trichomycteridae	Trichomycterus santanderensis	Colombia	2007	
Trichomycteridae	Trichomycterus sketi	Colombia	2010	
Trichomycteridae	Trichomycterus spelaeus	Venezuela	2001	
Trichomycteridae	Trichomycterus uisae (trepador)	Colombia	2008	
Sternopygidae	Eigenmannia vicentespelaea	Brazil	1996	
Amblyopsidae	Amblyopsis hoosieri (Hoosier cavefish)	United States	2014	
Amblyopsidae	Amblyopsis rosae (Ozark cavefish)	United States	1898	
Amblyopsidae	Amblyopsis spelaea (northern cavefish)	United States	1842	
Amblyopsidae	Forbesichthys agassizii (spring cavefish)	United States	1872	Found belowground, but also nearby in aboveground waters during the night
Amblyopsidae	Speoplatyrhinus poulsoni (Alabama cavefish)	United States	1974	
Amblyopsidae	Typhlichthys subterraneus (southern cavefish)	United States	1859	Possibly a species complex and T. eigemanni may be a valid species
Bythitidae	Diancistrus typhlops	Indonesia	2009	
Bythitidae	Lucifuga dentata (toothed Cuban cusk-eel)	Cuba	1858	
Bythitidae	Lucifuga lucayana (Lucaya cave brotula)	Bahamas	2006	
Bythitidae	Lucifuga simile	Cuba	1981	
Bythitidae	Lucifuga spelaeotes (New Providence cusk-eel)	Bahamas	1970	
Bythitidae	Lucifuga subterranea (Cuban cusk-eel)	Cuba	1858	
Bythitidae	Lucifuga teresinarum	Cuba	1988	
Bythitidae	Ogilbia galapagosensis (Galapagos cuskeel)	Ecuador	1965	Arguably not a true cavefish, as the places it inhabits also can be described as lagoon crevices
Bythitidae	Typhliasina pearsei (Mexican blind brotula)	Mexico	1938	
Poeciliidae	Poecilia mexicana (cave molly)	Mexico	1863	Species includes both aboveground and belowground forms (aboveground also in Central America)
Synbranchidae	Rakthamichthys digressus	India	2002	
Synbranchidae	Rakthamichthys indicus	India	1961	Originally described as Monopterus indicus by K. C. Eapen, but as this name was already taken by the Bombay swamp eel, it was redescribed as Monopterus eapeni in 1991. When the species was moved to the genus Rakthamichthys, the indicus specific epithet was revived.
Synbranchidae	Rakthamichthys roseni	India	1998	
Synbranchidae	Ophisternon candidum (blind cave eel)	Australia	1962	
Synbranchidae	Ophisternon infernale (blind swamp eel)	Mexico	1938	
Cottidae	C. bairdi—cognatus species complex (mottled sculpin/slimy sculpin)	United States	1850/1836	Aboveground forms relatively widespread in North America and Siberia, underground form only in Pennsylvania
Cottidae	Cottus carolinae (banded sculpin)	United States	1861	Aboveground forms relatively widespread in the United States, underground form only in West Virginia
Cottidae	Cottus specus (grotto sculpin)	United States	2013	Formerly included in C. carolinae
Butidae	Bostrychus microphthalmus	Indonesia	2005	The family Butidae was formerly considered a subfamily of Eleotridae
Butidae	Oxyeleotris caeca	Papua New Guinea	1996	The family Butidae was formerly considered a subfamily of Eleotridae
Butidae	Oxyeleotris colasi	Indonesia	2013	Has mistakenly been reported to occur in Papua New Guinea, but it is from Western New Guinea, the Indonesian part of the island. The family Butidae was formerly considered a subfamily of Eleotridae
Eleotridae	Caecieleotris morrisi (Oaxaca cave sleeper)	Mexico	2016	
Milyeringidae	Milyeringa brooksi	Australia	2010	The family Milyeringidae was formerly considered a subfamily of Eleotridae
Milyeringidae	Milyeringa justitia (Barrow cave gudgeon)	Australia	2013	The family Milyeringidae was formerly considered a subfamily of Eleotridae
Milyeringidae	Milyeringa veritas (blind gudgeon)	Australia	1945	The family Milyeringidae was formerly considered a subfamily of Eleotridae
Milyeringidae	Typhleotris madagascariensis	Madagascar	1933	The family Milyeringidae was formerly considered a subfamily of Eleotridae
Milyeringidae	Typhleotris mararybe	Madagascar	2012	The family Milyeringidae was formerly considered a subfamily of Eleotridae
Milyeringidae	Typhleotris pauliani	Madagascar	1959	The family Milyeringidae was formerly considered a subfamily of Eleotridae
Gobiidae	Caecogobius cryptophthalmus	Philippines	1991	
Gobiidae	Caecogobius personatus	Philippines	2019	
Gobiidae	Glossogobius ankaranensis	Madagascar	1994	
Gobiidae	Luciogobius albus	Japan	1940	
Gobiidae	Luciogobius pallidus	Japan	1940	
Aenigmachannidae	Aenigmachanna gollum (Gollum snakehead)	India	2019	One of two species in a unique fish family closely related to true snakeheads. Displays relatively few troglomorphisms despite living in underground aquifers, and thus could either be a recent arrival to the subterranean ecosystem or possibly a subtroglophile that periodically moves between the underground and surface.
Aenigmachannidae	Aenigmachanna mahabali	India	2019	One of two species in a unique fish family closely related to true snakeheads. Displays relatively few troglomorphisms despite living in underground aquifers, and thus could either be a recent arrival to the subterranean ecosystem or possibly a subtroglophile that periodically moves between the underground and surface.

== Conservation ==
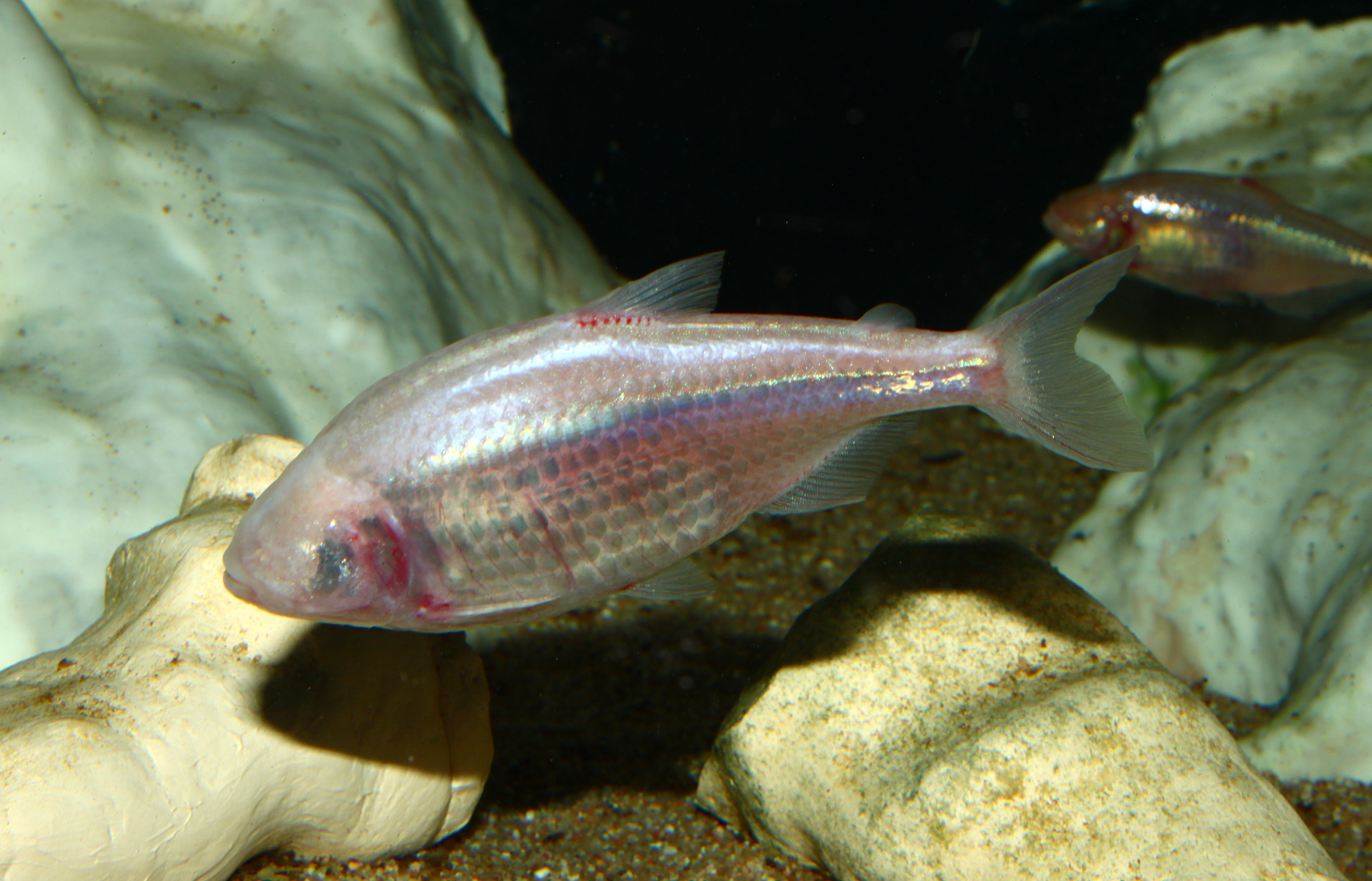
The cave form of the Mexican tetra is easily bred in captivity and the only cavefish widely available to aquarists

Although cavefish as a group are found throughout large parts of the world, many cavefish species have tiny ranges (often restricted to a single cave or cave system) and are seriously threatened. In 1996, more than 50 species were recognized as threatened by the IUCN and many, including several that are rare, have not been assessed at all. For example, the critically endangered Alabama cavefish is only found in the Key Cave and the entire population has been estimated at less than 100 individuals, while the critically endangered golden cave catfish is only found in the Aigamas cave in Namibia and has an estimated population of less than 400 individuals. The Haditha cavefish from Iraq and the Oaxaca cave sleeper from Mexico may already be extinct, as recent surveys have failed to find them. In some other cases, such as the Brazilian blind characid which went unrecorded by ichthyologists from 1962 to 2004, the apparent "rarity" was likely because of a lack of surveys in its range and habitat, as locals considered it relatively common until the early 1990s (more recently, this species appears to truly have declined significantly). Living in very stable environments, cavefish are likely more vulnerable to changes in the water (for example, temperature or oxygen) than fish of aboveground habitats which naturally experience greater variations. The main threats to cavefish are typically changes in the water level (mainly through water extraction or drought), habitat degradation and pollution, but in some cases introduced species and collection for the aquarium trade also present a threat. Cavefish often show little fear of humans and can sometimes be caught with the bare hands. Most cavefish lack natural predators, although larger cavefish may feed on smaller individuals, and cave-living crayfish, crabs, giant water bugs and spiders have been recorded feeding on a few species of cavefish.

Caves in some parts of the world have been protected, which can safeguard the cavefish. In a few cases, such as the Omani blind cavefish (Oman garra), zoos have initiated breeding programs as a safeguard. In contrast to the rarer species, the cave form of the Mexican tetral is easily bred in captivity and widely available to aquarists. This is the most studied cavefish species and likely also the most studied cave organism overall. As of 2006, only six other cavefish species have been bred in captivity, typically by scientists.

== See also ==
- Cave salamander
