= Ensembl genome database project =

Scientific project at the European Bioinformatics Institute

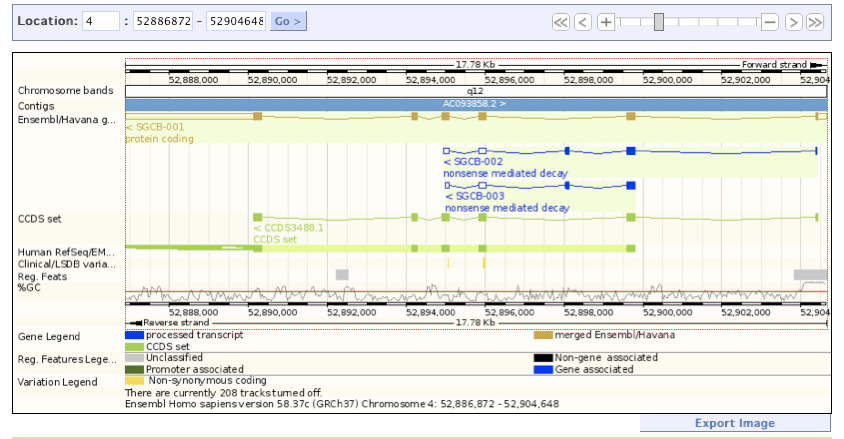

Content
- Description: Ensembl

Contact
- Research center: European Bioinformatics Institute
- Primary citation: Yates, et al. (2020)

Access
- Website: www.ensembl.org

Ensembl genome database project is a scientific project at the European Bioinformatics Institute, which provides a centralized resource for geneticists, molecular biologists and other researchers studying the genomes of our own species and other vertebrates and model organisms. Ensembl is one of several well known genome browsers for the retrieval of genomic information.

Similar databases and browsers are found at NCBI and the University of California, Santa Cruz (UCSC).

== History ==
The human genome consists of three billion base pairs, which code for approximately 20,000–25,000 genes. However the genome alone is of little use, unless the locations and relationships of individual genes can be identified. One option is manual annotation, whereby a team of scientists tries to locate genes using experimental data from scientific journals and public databases. However this is a slow, painstaking task. The alternative, known as automated annotation, is to use the power of computers to do the complex pattern-matching of protein to DNA. The Ensembl project was launched in 1999 in response to the imminent completion of the Human Genome Project, with the initial goals of automatically annotate the human genome, integrate this annotation with available biological data and make all this knowledge publicly available.

In the Ensembl project, sequence data are fed into the gene annotation system (a collection of software "pipelines" written in Perl) which creates a set of predicted gene locations and saves them in a MySQL database for subsequent analysis and display. Ensembl makes these data freely accessible to the world research community. All the data and code produced by the Ensembl project is available to download, and there is also a publicly accessible database server allowing remote access. In addition, the Ensembl website provides computer-generated visual displays of much of the data.

Over time the project has expanded to include additional species (including key model organisms such as mouse, fruitfly and zebrafish) as well as a wider range of genomic data, including genetic variations and regulatory features. Since April 2009, a sister project, Ensembl Genomes, has extended the scope of Ensembl into invertebrate metazoa, plants, fungi, bacteria, and protists, focusing on providing taxonomic and evolutionary context to genes, whilst the original project continues to focus on vertebrates.

As of 2020, Ensembl supported over 50 000 genomes across both Ensembl and Ensembl Genomes databases, adding some new innovative features such as Rapid Release, a new website designed to make genome annotation data available more quickly to users, and COVID-19, a new website to access to SARS-CoV-2 reference genome.

== Displaying genomic data ==
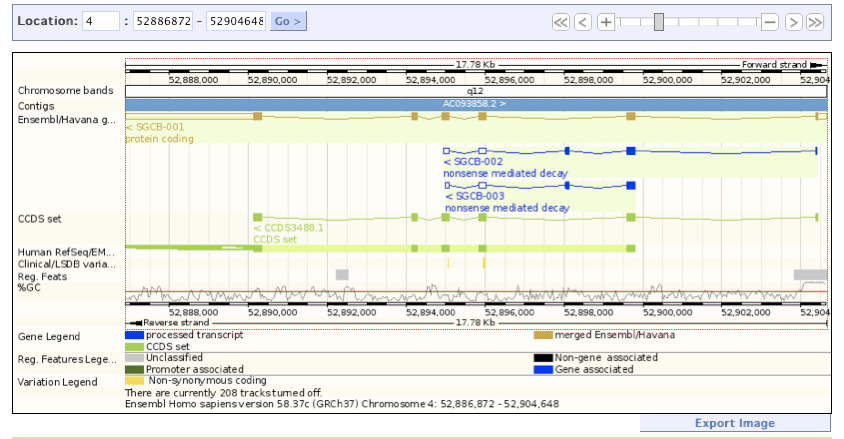
Gene SGCB aligned to the human genome

Central to the Ensembl concept is the ability to automatically generate graphical views of the alignment of genes and other genomic data against a reference genome. These are shown as data tracks, and individual tracks can be turned on and off, allowing the user to customise the display to suit their research interests. The interface also enables the user to zoom in to a region or move along the genome in either direction.

Other displays show data at varying levels of resolution, from whole karyotypes down to text-based representations of DNA and amino acid sequences, or present other types of display such as trees of similar genes (homologues) across a range of species. The graphics are complemented by tabular displays, and in many cases data can be exported directly from the page in a variety of standard file formats such as FASTA.

Externally produced data can also be added to the display by uploading a suitable file in one of the supported formats, such as BAM, BED, or PSL.

Graphics are generated using a suite of custom Perl modules based on GD, the standard Perl graphics display library.

== Alternative access methods ==
In addition to its website, Ensembl provides a REST API and a Perl API (Application Programming Interface) that models biological objects such as genes and proteins, allowing simple scripts to be written to retrieve data of interest. The same API is used internally by the web interface to display the data. It is divided into sections like the core API, the compara API (for comparative genomics data), the variation API (for accessing SNPs, SNVs, CNVs..), and the functional genomics API (to access regulatory data). The Ensembl website provides extensive information on how to install and use the API.

This software can be used to access the public MySQL database, avoiding the need to download enormous datasets. The users could even choose to retrieve data from the MySQL with direct SQL queries, but this requires an extensive knowledge of the current database schema.

Large datasets can be retrieved using the BioMart data-mining tool. It provides a web interface for downloading datasets using complex queries.

Last, there is an FTP server which can be used to download entire MySQL databases as well some selected data sets in other formats.

== Current species ==
The annotated genomes include the most fully sequenced vertebrates and selected model organisms. All of them are eukaryotes, there are no prokaryotes. As of 2022, there are 271 species registered, this includes:

Species
Chordata	Mammalia	Euarchontoglires	Primates	Angola colobus, black-capped squirrel monkey, black snub-nosed monkey, bonobo, bushbaby, capuchin, chimpanzee, common marmoset, Coquerel's sifaka, crab-eating macaque, drill, human, macaque, mouse lemur, gelada, gibbon, golden snub-nosed monkey, gorilla, greater bamboo lemur, green monkey, Ma's night monkey, olive baboon, orangutan, pig-tailed macaque, sooty mangabey, tarsier, Ugandan red colobus
Chordata	Mammalia	Euarchontoglires	Scandentia	tree shrew
Chordata	Mammalia	Euarchontoglires	Glires (Rodents + Lagomorphs)	Algerian mouse, alpine marmot, american beaver, arctic ground squirrel, Brazilian guineapig, chinese hamster, damaraland mole rat, daurian ground squirrel, degu, eurasian red squirrel, golden hamster, ground squirrel, guineapig, kangaroo rat, lesser Egyptian jerboa, long-tailed chinchilla, mongolian gerbil, mouse, naked mole-rat, North American deermouse, rat, pika, prairie vole, rabbit, Ryukyu mouse, shrew mouse, steppe mouse, thirteen-lined ground squirrel, Upper Galilee mountains blind mole rat
Chordata	Mammalia	Laurasiatheria		Alpaca, american bison, american black bear, american mink, Arabian camel, asian black bear, beluga whale, blue whale, chacoan peccary, California sea lion, Canada lynx, cat, cow, dingo, dog, dolphin, domestic yak, donkey, goat, ferret, giant panda, greater horseshoe bat, hedgehog, horse, leopard, lesser hedgehog tenrec, lion, meerkat, megabat, microbat, narwhal, polar bear, pig, red fox, sheep, shrew, Siberian musk deer, sperm whale, Siberian tiger, vaquita, wild yak, yarkand deer
Chordata	Mammalia	Afrotheria		Elephant, hyrax, tenrec
Chordata	Mammalia	Xenarthra		Armadillo, sloth
Chordata	Mammalia	Marsupialia		Common wombat, koala, opossum, Tasmanian devil, wallaby
Chordata	Mammalia	Monotremes		Platypus
Chordata	Reptilia			Argentine black and white tegu, blue-ringed sea krait, central bearded dragon, chinese softshell turtle, common snapping turtle, common wall lizard, desert tortoise, eastern brown snake, saltwater crocodile, Goode's thornscrub tortoise, green anole, indian cobra, komodo dragon, mainland tiger snake, painted turtle, Pinta Island tortoise, three-toed box turtle, tuatara, West African mud turtle
Chordata	Birds			African ostrich, bengalese finch, blue-crowned manakin, blue tit, budgerigar, burrowing owl, chicken, chicken (Red junglefowl), chicken (maternal Broiler), chicken (paternal White leghorn layer), chilean tinamou, colared flycatcher, common canary, common kestrel, dark-eyed junco, duck, eastern buzzard, eastern spot-billed duck, emu, eurasian eagle-owl, eurasian sparrowhawk, golden eagle, golden pheasant, golden-collared manakin, gouldian finch, great tit, great spotted kiwi, helmeted guineafowl, indian peafowl, japanese quail, kakapo, little spotted kiwi, mallard, medium ground finch, muscovy duck, New Caledonian crow, northern spotted owl, okarito brown kiwi, oriental scops owl, pink-footed goose, ring-necked pheasant, ruff, rufous-capped babbler, silver-eye, small tree finch, spoon-billed sandpiper, superb fairywren, Swainson's thrush, swan goose, turkey, white-throated sparrow, yellow-billed amazon, zebu, zebra finch
Chordata	Lissamphibia			Leisan spiny toad, Xenopus tropicalis
Chordata	Teleosts			Amazon molly, asian arowana, atlantic cod, atlantic herring, atlantic salmon, ballan wrasse, barramundi perch, bicolor damselfish, blind barbel, blue tilapia, blunt-snouted clingfish, brown trout, Burton's mouthbrooder, channel bull blenny, channel catfish, chinese rmedaka, chinook salmon, climbing perch, clown anemonefish, coelacanth, coho salmon, common carp, denticle herring, eastern happy, electric eel, elephant shark, european bass, gilthead bream, golden-line barbel, goldfish, greater amberjack, guppy, horned golden-line barbel, huchen, indian glassy fish, indian medaka, japanese medaka, javanese ricefish, jewelled blenny, large yellow croaker, live sharksucker, lumpfish, lyretail cichlid, Makobe island chichlid, mangrove rivulus, mexican tetra, Midas chichlid, Monterrey platyfish, mummichog, Nile tilapia, northern pike, ocean sunfish, orange clownfish, orbiculate cardinalfish, Paramormyrops kingsleyae, Periophthalmus magnuspinnatus, pike-perch, pinecone soldierfish, platyfish, rainbow trout, red-bellied piranha, reedfish, round goby, sailfin molly, sheepshead minnow, shortfin molly, Siamese fighting fish, spinny chromis, spotted gar, swamp eel, tetraodon, three-spined stickleback, tiger tail seahorse, tongue sole, turbot, turquoise killfish, western mosquitofish, yellowtail amberjack, Takifugu rubripes (fugu), zebrafish, zebra mbuna, zigzag eel
Chordata	Cyclostomata			Petromyzon marinus (sea lamprey), hagfish
Chordata	Tunicates			Ciona intestinalis, Ciona savignyi
Invertebrates	Insects			Drosophila melanogaster (fruitfly), Anopheles gambiae (mosquito), Aedes aegypti (mosquito)
Invertebrates	Worms			Caenorhabditis elegans
Yeast				Saccharomyces cerevisiae (baker's yeast)

== Open source/mirrors ==
All data part of the Ensembl project is open access and all software is open source, being freely available to the scientific community, under a CC BY 4.0 license. Currently, Ensembl database website is mirrored at three different locations worldwide to improve the service.

Official mirror sites
UK (Sanger Institute) ---- main website
US East (Amazon AWS) ---- Cloud-based mirror on East Coast of United States
Asia (Amazon AWS) ---- Cloud-based mirror in Singapore

== See also ==
- List of sequenced eukaryotic genomes
- List of biological databases
- Sequence analysis
- Sequence profiling tool
- Sequence motif
- UCSC Genome Browser
- ENCODE
