= Karstsinnectes =

Scientific classification
- Kingdom: Animalia
- Phylum: Chordata
- Class: Actinopterygii
- Order: Cypriniformes
- Family: Nemacheilidae
- Genus: Karstsinnectes; J. Zhou, Luo, Y.-L.Wang, J.-J. Zhou & Xiao, 1923

Type species
- Oreonectes anophthalmus B. S. Zheng, 1981

Genus of fishes

Karstinnectes is a genus of freshwater ray-finned fishes belonging to the family Nemacheilidae, the stone loaches. The fishes in this genus are cavefish found in China.

== Species ==
Karstsinnectes contains the following species:

- Karstsinnectes acridorsalis (J. H. Lan, 2013)
- Karstsinnectes anophthalmus (B. S. Zheng, 1981)
- Karstsinnectes cehengensis T. Luo, X. Zhao & Zhou, 2024 (Ceheng Chinese karst loach)
- Karstsinnectes daxinensis Luo, Zhou and Zhou 2024
- Karstsinnectes hyalinus (J. H. Lan, J. X. Yang & Y. R. Chen, 1996)
- Karstsinnectes longzhouensis Ge, Du & J.-J. Zhou, 2024
- Karstsinnectes parvus (Y. Zhu & D. G. Zhu, 2015)
