= Protocobitis =

Scientific classification
- Kingdom: Animalia
- Phylum: Chordata
- Class: Actinopterygii
- Order: Cypriniformes
- Family: Cobitidae
- Genus: Protocobitis; J. X. Yang & Y. R. Chen, 1993

Type species
- Protocobitis typhlops J. X. Yang & Y. R. Chen, 1993

Genus of fishes

Protocobitis is a genus of loaches endemic to Guangxi in China and living in caves.

== Species ==
There are currently three recognized species in this genus:

- Protocobitis anteroventris J. H. Lan, 2013
- Protocobitis polylepis Y. Zhu, Y. J. Lu, J. X. Yang & S. Zhang, 2008
- Protocobitis typhlops J. X. Yang & Y. R. Chen, 1993
