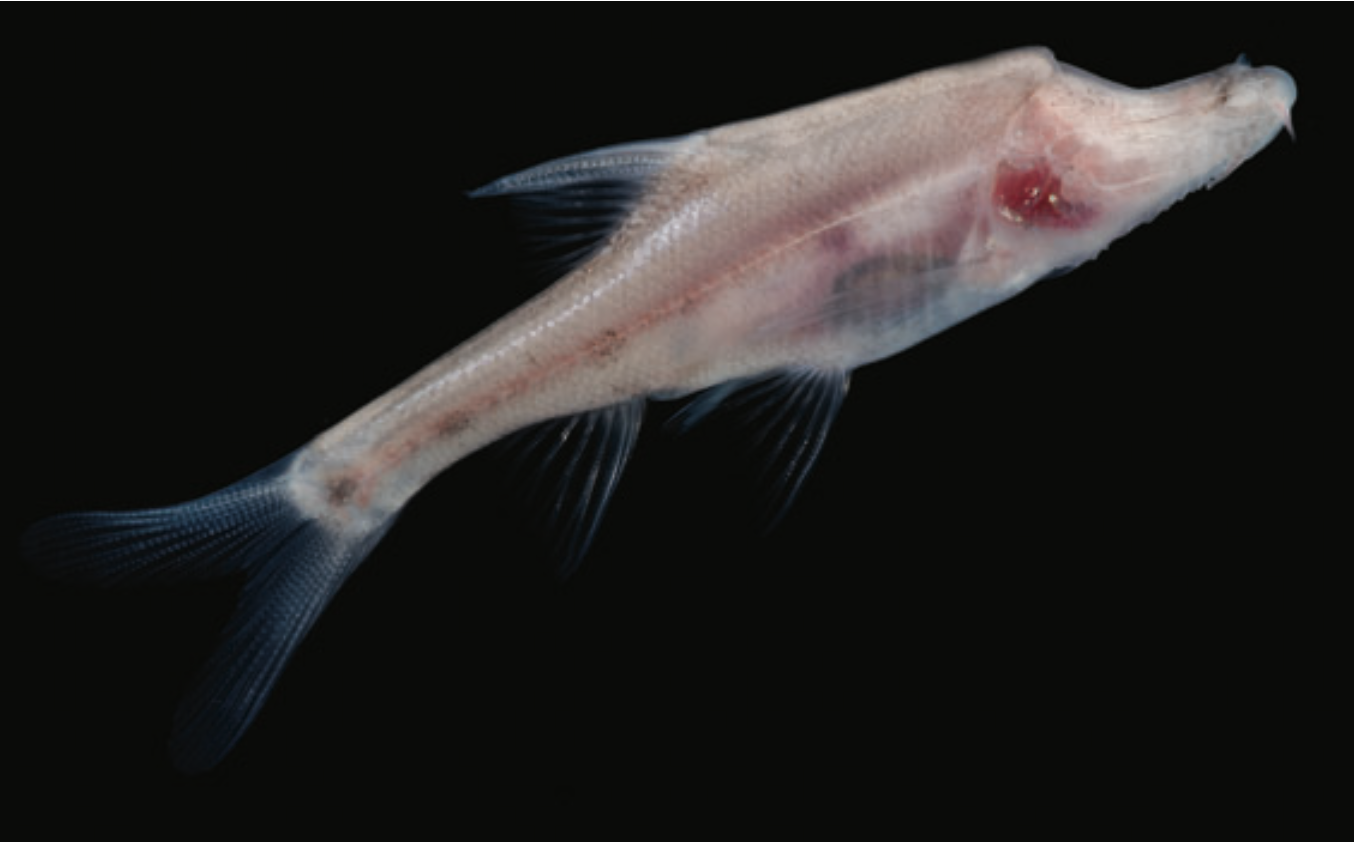

Scientific classification
- Kingdom: Animalia
- Phylum: Chordata
- Class: Actinopterygii
- Division: Teleostei
- Order: Cypriniformes
- Family: Cyprinidae
- Subfamily: Cyprininae
- Genus: Sinocyclocheilus; P. W. Fang, 1936

Type species
- Sinocyclocheilus tingi P. W. Fang, 1936

Synonyms
- Anchicyclocheilus Li & Lan, 1992; Gibbibarbus Dai, 1988

= Sinocyclocheilus =

Genus of fishes

Sinocyclocheilus is a genus of freshwater cyprinid fish endemic to the karst landscapes of southwestern China, predominantly in the provinces of Guizhou, Yunnan, and the Guangxi Zhuang Autonomous Region. Almost all of its species live in or around caves and most of these have adaptions typical of cavefish such as a lack of scales, lack of pigmentation and reduced eyes (some are completely blind). Several species have an unusual hunchbacked appearance and some of the cave-dwellers have a "horn" on the back (above the forehead), the function of which is unclear. In contrast, the non-cave or surface-associated lineages within the genus lack many of these highly specialized features. Adult sizes vary across species, but many reach up to ~23 cm (9.1 in) in total length. Many species are highly restricted in range (often to single caves or cave systems) and have small populations. Conservation status of evaluated species is often of concern, while many species populations in the genus have yet to be evaluated by the IUCN.

The type species is S. tingi. The name is derived from the Latin word sino, meaning "from China", and the Greek word kyklos, meaning "circle", and the Greek word cheilos, meaning "lip".

== Evolution ==
Sinocyclocheilus is a genus of cyprinid fish in the family Cyprinidae, they are known for their adaptations to cave environments. All fish in this genus are endemic to the karst regions of the Yunnan-Guizhou Plateau and adjacent areas in southwest China. They represent one of the most diverse groups of cavefish in the world.

=== Phylogenetic position ===
Molecular phylogenetic studies based on mitochondrial genomes strongly supports Sinocyclocheilus as a monophyletic group within the "Barbinae". The conception of a subfamily "Barbinae" that includes Sinocyclocheilus, although molecularlly consisient on its own (it does form a clade including Barbus) and very popular among Chinese researchers of this genus, is incompatible with the common view of Barbinae. In mainstream views, Sinocyclocheilus belongs to subfamily Cyprininae; a further classification into a tribe may be used if more granularity is desired.

=== Evolutionary history ===
Molecular evidences estimate the origin of the genus Sinocyclocheilus to the late Miocene (approximately 6.49 million years ago). This diversification period is strongly associated with the intensive uplift of the Tibetan Plateau, a major geological event that dramatically altered the topography of the region. It is hypothesized that the ancestors of Sinocyclocheilus were widespread in the region and repeatedly colonized the karst cave systems as the geological changes created new ecologically isolated populations.

The species S. jii is consistently identified as the sister species to all other species within the genus.

=== Multiple independent origins of cave adaptation ===
When life habits and other traits of Sinocyclocheilus are overlaid onto their molecular phylogeny, it appears that the cave-dwelling species do not form a single evolutionary lineage. This pattern indicates that their adaptations to the cave environment, a process known as troglomorphy (e.g., eye degeneration, loss of pigmentation), evolved multiple times independently within the genus.

=== Polyploidy ===
Many species within the genus, including S. microphthalmus, are allotetraploids, possessing four sets of chromosomes derived from ancestral hybridization events. Genomic analyses indicate that gene duplication resulting from polyploidy may have contributed to evolutionary diversification within the genus and has been associated with adaptations to cave environments, including eye degeneration and modification of sensory systems.

Based on subgenome comparison, S. anshuiensis (and presumably other species of the genus) shares the same allo-tetraploidization event with the common carp Cyprinus carpio. The two species are estimated to have diverged around 10 million years ago, so the event predates that time. This event is also shared with the goldfish, which subsequently reverted to diploid.

== Ecology ==
The ecology of the genus Sinocyclocheilus is mainly shaped by its habitat. Surface species exhibit normal ecology, deep cavefishes have evolved behavioral, sensorial, and life-history adaptations to thrive in the darkness. Although facing many challenges, they are able to survive in the karst cave systems with their unique physiologies.

=== Habitat ===
Most cave-dwelling Sinocyclocheilus species inhabit freshwater environments of limestone caves. Where their habitat is characterized by a complete absence of light, stable low water temperatures, and often oligotrophic (nutrient-poor) conditions. Their degree of troglomorphism (cave adaptation) is often correlated with the extent of isolation within the subterranean systems, with highly specialized eyeless species being mostly restricted to the deepest isolated cave chambers.

=== Behavioral ecology ===
With the absence of light, Sinocyclocheilus cavefish cannot rely on their vision for foraging. Instead, they have evolved non-visual sensory systems to locate food. Genomic studies revealed a significant expansion of taste receptor genes, such as the duplication of Tas1r1 and Tas2r200-2 genome in S. anshuiensis, S. grahami, and S. rhinocerous, suggesting improvements to the sense of taste in the cave-restricted areas, which is likely used to detect prey and organic matter in the dark.

A key behavioral adaptation for foraging is wall-following (WF), a form of thigmotaxis where the fish swims closely along the boundaries of its environment. This behavior is common in the genus but is significantly enhanced in eyeless species. Comparative studies showed that eyeless Sinocyclocheilus have a longer swimming distance and spend more time moving at higher speeds along walls compared to their normal-eyed, surface-dwelling relatives. This enhanced wall-following is an adaptive strategy for efficient spatial exploration in the dark, allowing the fish to navigate through their habitat to locate resources.

Activity patterns also reflect energy conservation strategies. While eyeless forms are mostly constantly active in wall-following behavior, normal-eyed species exhibit significantly more resting behavior. This suggests that eyed species may conserve energy by relying more on visual cues when available, while blind species must invest continuous energy in active, non-visual exploration.

=== Reproduction ===
The life-history strategies of Sinocyclocheilus are profoundly influenced by its resource-poor cave environment. One adaptation for this is to reduce fecundity. The cave-restricted S. anshuiensis has an absolute fecundity of only about 143 mature eggs, compare to the roughly 2,400 eggs found in that of surface-dwelling species S. grahami. This represents a shift towards a K-selected reproductive strategy, where energy is allocated to produce fewer offspring in an environment where competition is low but extremely limited resources. Genomic analysis suggests this might be linked to the loss of the Creb314 gene in S. anshuiensis, which is involved in germ cell survival.

== Cultural and economic value ==
Sinocyclocheilus species hold significant value in traditional Chinese medicine and cultural heritage. S. grahami (滇池金线鲃) holds a unique position as the only known cavefish species globally to be utilized in both traditional medicine and aquaculture. Its use dates back to at least the Ming Dynasty documented by Ming pharmacologist Mao Lan as the "golden lined fish" in the Chinese medicinal classic "Materia Medica of Southern Yunnan" (《滇南本草》). It was prized for its tender flesh and nourishing properties, and has been used to treat symptoms such as chronic fatigue, aging-related weakness, kidney deficiency, and childhood convulsions. Due to severe population decline in the wild, artificial breeding programs were initiated in 2004, leading to the successful cultivation of a second generation of over 100,000 individuals by 2008. This achievement represents a successful model of aquaculture, prevented the species from extinction via sustainable utilization.

== Conservation status ==
The species of the Sinocyclocheilus genus is among the most threatened freshwater fish in China, facing a severe conservation crisis. A significant number of species are assessed as threatened by the IUCN (International Union for Conservation of Nature), including 6 species classified as Critically Endangered of which one is Possibly Extinct), 5 as Endangered, and 8 as Vulnerable on the IUCN Red List. This is supported by a comprehensive national assessment, which identified Sinocyclocheilus as the genus with the most urgent conservation needs among Chinese freshwater fishes.

The primary threat to these cavefish is their extremely limited distribution. Many species are endemic to a single cave or subterranean river system, making their populations vulnerable to extinction. Pollution from surface activities can easily infiltrate karst aquifers, which have a low capacity for self-purification. Dam construction and the development of cave tourism also contributes to habitat degradation.

Recent years have seen an increase in conservation action. Specific protected areas have been established for cavefishes, such as the Lingyun-Leye cave-fish protected area in Guangxi and the Jiuxiang National Park in Yunnan.

== Species ==
These are the recognized species in this genus:

- Sinocyclocheilus altishoulderus (W. X. Li & J. H. Lan, 1992)
- Sinocyclocheilus aluensis W. X. Li & H. Xiao, 2005
- Sinocyclocheilus anatirostris R. D. Lin & Z. F. Luo, 1986 (Duck-billed golden-line fish)
- Sinocyclocheilus angularis J. Z. Zheng & J. Wang, 1990 (Golden-colored angle fish)
- Sinocyclocheilus angustiporus C. Y. Zheng & J. H. Xie, 1985
- Sinocyclocheilus anophthalmus Y. R. Chen, X. L. Chu, Z. Y. Luo & J. Y. Wu, 1988 (Eye-less golden-line fish)
- Sinocyclocheilus anshuiensis X. Gan, T. J. Wu, M. L. Wei & J. Yang, 2013
- Sinocyclocheilus aquihornes W. X. Li & H. F. Yang, 2007
- Sinocyclocheilus bannaensis W. X. Li, C. Q. Li & H. Y. Chen, 2019
- Sinocyclocheilus biangularis D. Wang, 1996
- Sinocyclocheilus bicornutus D. Z. Wang & J. W. Liao, 1997
- Sinocyclocheilus brevibarbatus Y. H. Zhao, J. H. Lan & C. G. Zhang, 2009
- Sinocyclocheilus brevifinus J. Li, X. H. Li & Mayden, 2014
- Sinocyclocheilus brevis J. H. Lan & J. X. Chen, 1992
- Sinocyclocheilus broadihornes W. X. Li & W. N. Mao, 2007
- Sinocyclocheilus changlensis Liu, Mao & Yang, 2025 (Changle golden-line barb)
- Sinocyclocheilus convexiforeheadus W. X. Li, H. F. Yang & C. Q. Li, 2017
- Sinocyclocheilus cyphotergous (D. Y. Dai, 1988)
- Sinocyclocheilus donglanensis Y. H. Zhao, K. Watanabe & C. G. Zhang, 2006
- Sinocyclocheilus flexuosdorsalis D. G. Zhu & Y. Zhu, 2012
- Sinocyclocheilus furcodorsalis Y. R. Chen, J. X. Yang & J. H. Lan, 1997 (Crossed fork-back golden-line fish)
- Sinocyclocheilus gracilicaudatus Y. H. Zhao & C. G. Zhang, 2014
- Sinocyclocheilus gracilis J. Li & W. X. Li, 2014
- Sinocyclocheilus grahami (Regan, 1904) (Golden-line barbel)
- Sinocyclocheilus guanyangensis Y. Q. Chen, C. L. Peng & E. Zhang, 2016
- Sinocyclocheilus guilinensis C. S. Ji, 1985
- Sinocyclocheilus guishanensis W. X. Li, 2003
- Sinocyclocheilus guiyang W. H. Shao, G. Y. Cheng, X. L. Lu, J. J. Zhou & Z. X. Zeng, 2024
- Sinocyclocheilus huangtianensis D. G. Zhu, Y. Zhu & J. H. Lan, 2011
- Sinocyclocheilus huaningensis W. X. Li, 1998
- Sinocyclocheilus huanjiangensis T. J. Wu, X. Gan & W. X. Li, 2010
- Sinocyclocheilus hugeibarbus W. X. Li & J. C. Ran, 2003
- Sinocyclocheilus huizeensis C. Cheng, X. F. Pan, X. Y. Chen, J. Y. Li, L. Ma & J. X. Yang, 2015
- Sinocyclocheilus hyalinus Y. R. Chen & J. X. Yang, 1993 (Hyaline fish)
- Sinocyclocheilus jii C. G. Zhang & D. Y. Dai, 1992
- Sinocyclocheilus jinxiensis Zheng, Xiu & Yang, 2013
- Sinocyclocheilus jiuxuensis W. X. Li & J. H. Lan, 2003
- Sinocyclocheilus lateristriatus W. X. Li, 1992
- Sinocyclocheilus lingyunensis W. X. Li, H. Xiao & Z. F. Luo, 2000
- Sinocyclocheilus longibarbatus D. Z. Wang & Y. Y. Chen, 1989
- Sinocyclocheilus longicornus X. Cheng, L. Tao, J. J. Zhou, W. Li, X. R. Zhao, H. F. Yang, N. Xiao, J. Zhou, 2023 (Long-horned golden-lined fish)
- Sinocyclocheilus longifinus W. X. Li & A. L. Chen, 1996
- Sinocyclocheilus longshanensis Li & Wu, 2018
- Sinocyclocheilus luolouensis J. H. Lan, 2013
- Sinocyclocheilus luopingensis W. X. Li & J. N. Tao, 2002
- Sinocyclocheilus macrocephalus [W. X. Li, 1985
- Sinocyclocheilus macrolepis D. Z. Wang & Y. Y. Chen, 1989
- Sinocyclocheilus macrophthalmus C. G. Zhang & Y. H. Zhao, 2001
- Sinocyclocheilus macroscalus (W. X. Li, 1996)
- Sinocyclocheilus maculatus W. X. Li, 2000
- Sinocyclocheilus maitianheensis [W. X. Li, 1992
- Sinocyclocheilus malacopterus X. L. Chu & G. H. Cui, 1985
- Sinocyclocheilus mashanensis T. J. Wu, Z. P. Liao & W. X. Li, 2010
- Sinocyclocheilus microphthalmus G. L. Li, 1989 (Small-eye golden-line fish)
- Sinocyclocheilus multipunctatus (Pellegrin, 1931)
- Sinocyclocheilus oxycephalus W. X. Li, 1985
- Sinocyclocheilus pairuensis Li, Liang & Li, 2026
- Sinocyclocheilus panzhouensis Luo, Chen & Zhou, 2025 (Panzhou golden-lined barbel)
- Sinocyclocheilus pingchowensis Zeng & Zhou, 2026
- Sinocyclocheilus pingshanensis W. X. Li, C. Q. Li, C. Lan & Z. L. Wu, 2018
- Sinocyclocheilus punctatus Y. Lan & J. Yang, 2017
- Sinocyclocheilus purpureus W. X. Li, 1985
- Sinocyclocheilus qiubeiensis W. X. Li, 2002
- Sinocyclocheilus qujingensis W. X. Li, W. N. Mao & Z. M. Lu, 2002
- Sinocyclocheilus rhinocerous W. X. Li & J. N. Tao, 1994
- Sinocyclocheilus robustus J. X. Chen & Z. F. Zhao, 1988
- Sinocyclocheilus ronganensis F. G. Luo, J. Huang & J. Wen 2016
- Sinocyclocheilus sanxiaensis W. S. Jiang, J. Li, J. X. Yang & J. B. Chang 2019
- Sinocyclocheilus simengensis C. Q. Li, Z. L. Wu, W. X. Li & C. Lan, 2018
- Sinocyclocheilus tianlinensis J. Zhao, C. G. Zhang & A. Y. He, 2004
- Sinocyclocheilus tileihornes W. N. Mao, Z. M. Lu & W. X. Li, 2003
- Sinocyclocheilus tingi P. W. Fang, 1936
- Sinocyclocheilus wanlanensis Liu, Mao & Yang, 2025
- Sinocyclocheilus wenshanensis C. Q. Li, H. F. Yang, W. X. Li & Y. Y. Chen, 2017
- Sinocyclocheilus wui W. X. Li & L. An, 2013
- Sinocyclocheilus wumengshanensis W. X. Li, W. N. Mao & Z. M. Lu, 2003
- Sinocyclocheilus xichouensis X. F. Pan, L. Li, J. X. Yang & X. Y. Chen, 2013
- Sinocyclocheilus xiejiahuai T. Luo, C. Fan, N. Xiao & J. Zhou, 2024 (Xie’s golden-lined fish)
- Sinocyclocheilus xingrenensis Luo, Xiao, Zhou, Xiao & Zhou, 2025 (Xingren golden-lined fish)
- Sinocyclocheilus xingyiensis Q. Lui, Q. Tang, L. Deng, Q. Duan & R. Zhang, 2024
- Sinocyclocheilus xunlensis J. H. Lan, Y. H. Zhao & C. G. Zhang, 2004
- Sinocyclocheilus yangzongensis S. L. Tsu & Y. R. Chen, 1977
- Sinocyclocheilus yimenensis W. X. Li & H. Xiao, 2005
- Sinocyclocheilus yishanensis W. X. Li & J. H. Lan, 1992
- Sinocyclocheilus zhenfengensis T. Liu, H. Q. Deng, L. Ma, N. Xiao & J. Zhou, 2018
- Sinocyclocheilus zhenningensis Wang, Luo & Zhang, 2025 (Zhenning golden-lined barbel)

Synonyms

- Sinocyclocheilus albeoguttatus Zhou & Li, 1998; valid as S. anatirostris
- Sinocyclocheilus guanduensis (W. X. Li & H. Xiao, 2004); valid as S. grahami
- Sinocyclocheilus yaolanensis J. Zhou, X. Z. Li & X. F. Hou, 2009; valid as S. longibarbatus
