= Kryptoglanis shajii =

Conservation status
- Endangered (IUCN 3.1)

Scientific classification
- Kingdom: Animalia
- Phylum: Chordata
- Class: Actinopterygii
- Order: Siluriformes
- Family: Kryptoglanidae; Britz, Kakkassery & Raghavan, 2014
- Genus: Kryptoglanis; Vincent & J. Thomas, 2011
- Species: K. shajii

Binomial name
- Kryptoglanis shajii Vincent & J. Thomas, 2011

Species of fish

Kryptoglanis shajii is a species of subterranean catfish found in subsurface waters in the Western Ghats in Kerala, India. This cavefish grows to a length of 5.9 centimetres (2.3 in) SL. It is currently the only known member of its genus and family. Although first discovered from underground waters, it has also been seen in dense vegetation in paddy fields and was found to be common in this habitat in the Chalakudy. The species strongly avoids light and feeds on small invertebrates.

This genus and Horaglanis, both from the Western Ghats, are the only known underground-living catfish in India.

== Morphological characteristics ==
The morphology of K. shajii differs from all other known species of catfish and includes such features as the absence of dorsal fin; the presence of four pairs of barbels; an upwardly directed mouth, with a distinctly projecting lower jaw with 4 set of teeth; subcutaneous eyes; anal fin completely confluent with the caudal fin; anal and caudal fins together carry 70–74 fin rays; and no spines in any of the fins. These differences have led to its being assigned to its own family.
