= Sinocyclocheilus donglanensis =

Scientific classification
- Kingdom: Animalia
- Phylum: Chordata
- Class: Actinopterygii
- Order: Cypriniformes
- Family: Cyprinidae
- Subfamily: Cyprininae
- Genus: Sinocyclocheilus
- Species: S. donglanensis

Binomial name
- Sinocyclocheilus donglanensis Y. H. Zhao, K. Watanabe & Y. H. Zhao, 2006

Species of fish

Sinocyclocheilus donglanensis (Donglan golden-line barbel) is a species of cave fish in the family Cyprinidae. It is endemic to Guangxi province in southern China, and only known from a subterranean tributary of the Hongshui River, a tributary of the Pearl River. Its specific name donglanensis refers to the Donglan County where its type locality is located. It is not known from elsewhere.

== Description ==
Sinocyclocheilus donglanensis grows to 12.4 cm (4.9 in) standard length; mean length of five individuals was 8.3 cm (3.3 in). The head is compressed and has developed eyes. The mouth has two barbels and is slightly inferior, with the upper jaw that protrudes slightly beyond the lower one. The body is compressed and completely scaled. The highest body depth (about 31% of standard length) occurs exactly at the dorsal fin insertion. The lateral line is complete and curved. In preservative, the colour of the back is dark brownish; the abdomen is light grayish. Pelvic and anal fins are light yellowish.

It resembles morphologically most closely Sinocyclocheilus yishanensis known from the Liu River, another river in the Pearl River system. Both have "normal" body shape, in contrast to some other Sinocyclocheilus species showing humps or horns.

== Ecology and behaviour ==
Virtually nothing is known about the ecology and behaviour of this species. It shares its habitat (and type locality) with another cave fish species, Sinocyclocheilus altishoulderus.

Sinocyclocheilus donglanensis is only known from the Donglan County in Guangxi, China

== Habitat and conservation ==
The type locality, near Gongping Village, Taiping Town, Donglan County, is a subterranean river some 10–20 metres inside from the mouth of a small cave. During the rainy season, the water can extend outside the cave to form a small lake. The habitat is potentially threatened by water extraction, waste disposal and pesticide pollution, and landscape alterations in general.
