= Caecobarbus =

Congo blind barb

Conservation status
- Vulnerable (IUCN 3.1)
- CITES Appendix II

Scientific classification
- Kingdom: Animalia
- Phylum: Chordata
- Class: Actinopterygii
- Order: Cypriniformes
- Family: Cyprinidae
- Subfamily: Smiliogastrinae
- Genus: Caecobarbus; Boulenger, 1921
- Species: C. geertsi

Binomial name
- Caecobarbus geertsi Boulenger, 1921

Genus of fishes

Caecobarbus is a monospecific genus of freshwater ray-finned fish belonging to the family Cyprinidae. which includes the carps, barbs and related fishes. The only species in the genus is Caecobarbus geertsi, the African blind barb or Congo blind barb (known as Nzonzi a mpofo in the local Kikongo language, meaning "blind barb"). This threatened cavefish is only known from Democratic Republic of the Congo, George Albert Boulenger described this fish in 1921 and it apparently lacks any close relatives in the Congo region.

Despite its common name, "African blind barb", other blind cave cyprinids are indigenous to Africa, notably the Somalian Barbopsis devecchi and Phreatichthys andruzzii.

== Range ==
The Congo blind barb is found only in the Thysville Cave system, a part of the lower Congo River basin (notably Kwilu and Inkisi tributaries) in the Democratic Republic of the Congo. The area where it is found covers about 120 km^{2} (45 mi^{2}), and is located at an altitude around 700–850 m (2,300–2,800 ft) above sea level. It was initially known from seven caves in the Thysville system and an additional seven were discovered in the 2000s (decade). The caves where found have high levels of calcium bicarbonate in the water and high variations in flood levels, meaning that animals such as terrestrial cave insects are absent.

== Conservation ==
In the seven caves where first discovered, the total population has been estimated at perhaps 7,000 individuals in the 1950s; no estimates are available for the seven more recently discovered populations. Among the first seven, one has disappeared entirely following quarrying of limestone that began in the 1930s. The caves where it lives are considered sacred by the locals, and this restricts access to most of them. A local law passed in 1937 limits fishing and the species has been listed on CITES since 1981, which limits international trade. Before its listing on CITES Appendix II, the species was often caught and exported for the freshwater aquarium trade, but few exports have happened after. Currently, the main threat is habitat loss: The human population in its range is increasing and farming near the caves can result in sedimentation and pollution. The region was formerly covered in rainforest and grassland, which limited erosion. Other potentially serious threats are changes to the hydrology (for example, large-scale water extraction) of the small rivers that feed the caves and predation by Clarias catfish found in at least some places inhabited by the Congo blind barb.

== Appearance ==
Like other cavefish, the Congo blind barb has reduced pigmentation and no externally visible eyes. Because of the lack of pigment, it appears pale whitish-pink overall. The operculum and lateral line region are purplish-red due to the gills and lateral line veins, respectively. The eye completely lacks a lens, and the retina and optical nerve are rudimentary and located deep inside the head. Despite this, the fish is photophobic, actively avoiding light. Its maximum total length is 12 cm (4.7 in). Minor differences have been described between the different cave populations; some have a spot on the opercular and one has a serrated dorsal fin spine.

== Behavior ==
The Congo blind barb mainly relies on food items that flow into the cave during the rainy (flood) season, but it may also feed on small crustaceans. Its longevity is estimated to be 9–14 years, but it may be able to live longer. It is slow-growing and likely has a slow reproduction rate. The adhesive eggs are spawned freely, ending up in crevices and pores in the bottom, which protects them from predation.
