= Blind loach =

Blind loach is a common name for several fishes and may refer to:

- Eidinemacheilus smithi, native to Iran
- Oreonectes anophthalmus, native to caves in China
