= Caecocypris =

Conservation status
- Critically endangered, possibly extinct (IUCN 3.1)

Scientific classification
- Kingdom: Animalia
- Phylum: Chordata
- Class: Actinopterygii
- Order: Cypriniformes
- Family: Cyprinidae
- Subfamily: Barbinae
- Genus: Caecocypris; Banister & Bunni, 1980
- Species: C. basimi

Binomial name
- Caecocypris basimi Banister & Bunni, 1980

Genus of fishes

Caecocypris basimi, the Haditha cavefish, is a species of cyprinid fish endemic to Iraq, only occurring in aquifers near Haditha. It is found in an underground sinkhole directly under a shrine the only way to access which is a well 5m below the shrine. This cavefish is the only member of its genus. The species is classed as Critically endangered, possibly extinct, by the IUCN, as there have been no records since 1983 despite a comprehensive survey in 2012. The primary threat is water extraction, which has lowered the groundwater level. It is placed as one of the top 10 lost freshwater fishes to be found.

The cavefish Garra widdowsoni is found in the same place and it has also drastically declined, but it is not as rare as Caecocypris basimi. The only other known cavefish in Iraq is Eidinemacheilus proudlovei.

The holotype of Caecocypris basimi, collected by Dr. Basim M Al Azzawi in 1977, is deposited at the British Museum of Natural History and other specimens are at the Australian Museum.
