= Sinocyclocheilus xichouensis =

Scientific classification
- Domain: Eukaryota
- Kingdom: Animalia
- Phylum: Chordata
- Class: Actinopterygii
- Order: Cypriniformes
- Family: Cyprinidae
- Subfamily: Cyprininae
- Genus: Sinocyclocheilus
- Species: S. xichouensis

Binomial name
- Sinocyclocheilus xichouensis Pan, Li, Yang & Chen, 2013

Species of fish

Sinocyclocheilus xichouensis is an Asian freshwater species of ray-finned fish in the genus Sinocyclocheilus. It is benthopelagic and is found in China.
