= Sinocyclocheilus yimenensis =

Scientific classification
- Kingdom: Animalia
- Phylum: Chordata
- Class: Actinopterygii
- Order: Cypriniformes
- Family: Cyprinidae
- Subfamily: Cyprininae
- Genus: Sinocyclocheilus
- Species: S. yimenensis

Binomial name
- Sinocyclocheilus yimenensis W. X. Li, H. Xiao, 2005

Species of fish

Sinocyclocheilus yimenensis (common name: Yimen golden-line barbel) is a species of cave fish in the family Cyprinidae. It is endemic to Yunnan province in southern China. Its specific name yimenensis refers to the Yimen County where its type locality is.

== Description ==
It grows to 10.5 cm (4.1 in) standard length and has a scaled, elongated body. The colouration is golden with a darker back and with some dark speckles.

== Habitat ==
The type locality is an exit of a subterranean stream.

Sinocyclocheilus yimenensis is only known from Yimen County, Yunnan, China
