= Sinocyclocheilus yangzongensis =

Conservation status
- Critically Endangered (IUCN 3.1)

Scientific classification
- Kingdom: Animalia
- Phylum: Chordata
- Class: Actinopterygii
- Order: Cypriniformes
- Family: Cyprinidae
- Subfamily: Cyprininae
- Genus: Sinocyclocheilus
- Species: S. yangzongensis

Binomial name
- Sinocyclocheilus yangzongensis S. L. Tsu & Y. R. Chen, 1977

Species of fish

Sinocyclocheilus yangzongensis is a species of ray-finned fish in the genus Sinocyclocheilus.
