= Sinocyclocheilus angustiporus =

Scientific classification
- Domain: Eukaryota
- Kingdom: Animalia
- Phylum: Chordata
- Class: Actinopterygii
- Order: Cypriniformes
- Family: Cyprinidae
- Subfamily: Cyprininae
- Genus: Sinocyclocheilus
- Species: S. angustiporus

Binomial name
- Sinocyclocheilus angustiporus C. Y. Zheng & J. H. Xie, 1985

Synonyms
- Sinocyclocheilus aluensis Li, Xiao, Feng & Zhao, 2005

Species of fish

Sinocyclocheilus angustiporus is a species of ray-finned fish in the genus Sinocyclocheilus.
