= Sinocyclocheilus wumengshanensis =

Scientific classification
- Kingdom: Animalia
- Phylum: Chordata
- Class: Actinopterygii
- Order: Cypriniformes
- Family: Cyprinidae
- Subfamily: Cyprininae
- Genus: Sinocyclocheilus
- Species: S. wumengshanensis

Binomial name
- Sinocyclocheilus wumengshanensis W. X. Li, W. N. Mao & Zong-Min Lu, 2003

Species of fish

Sinocyclocheilus wumengshanensis is a species of ray-finned fish in the genus Sinocyclocheilus.
