= Anchicyclocheilus =

Scientific classification
- Kingdom: Animalia
- Phylum: Chordata
- Class: Actinopterygii
- Order: Cypriniformes
- Family: Cyprinidae
- Subfamily: Barbinae
- Genus: Anchicyclocheilus
- Species: A. halfibindus

Binomial name
- Anchicyclocheilus halfibindus W. X. Li & J. H. Lan, 1992

Synonyms
- Sinocyclocheilus halfibindus (Li & Lan, 1992)

Species of fish

Anchicyclocheilus halfibindus is a species of cyprinid fish endemic to China. It is the only recognized species in its genus, although some authorities treat it as a synonym of Sinocyclocheilus microphthalmus.
