= Sinocyclocheilus guishanensis =

Conservation status
- Vulnerable (IUCN 3.1)

Scientific classification
- Kingdom: Animalia
- Phylum: Chordata
- Class: Actinopterygii
- Order: Cypriniformes
- Family: Cyprinidae
- Subfamily: Cyprininae
- Genus: Sinocyclocheilus
- Species: S. guishanensis

Binomial name
- Sinocyclocheilus guishanensis W. X. Li, 2003

Species of fish

Sinocyclocheilus guishanensis is a species of ray-finned fish in the genus Sinocyclocheilus.
