= Sinocyclocheilus qujingensis =

Scientific classification
- Kingdom: Animalia
- Phylum: Chordata
- Class: Actinopterygii
- Order: Cypriniformes
- Family: Cyprinidae
- Subfamily: Cyprininae
- Genus: Sinocyclocheilus
- Species: S. qujingensis

Binomial name
- Sinocyclocheilus qujingensis W. X. Li, W. N. Mao & Zong-Min Lu, 2002

Species of fish

Sinocyclocheilus qujingensis is a species of ray-finned fish in the genus Sinocyclocheilus.

== Etymology ==
Sinocyclocheilus qujingensis gets its name from Quijing City in Yunnan, China.

== Characteristics ==
Sinocyclocheilus qujingensis is a tropical freshwater fish. It is benthopelagic.

== Distribution ==
Sinocyclocheilus qujingensis inhabits the waters of Yunnan, China.
