= Sinocyclocheilus brevis =

Conservation status
- Endangered (IUCN 3.1)

Scientific classification
- Kingdom: Animalia
- Phylum: Chordata
- Class: Actinopterygii
- Order: Cypriniformes
- Family: Cyprinidae
- Subfamily: Cyprininae
- Genus: Sinocyclocheilus
- Species: S. brevis

Binomial name
- Sinocyclocheilus brevis J. H. Lan & J. X. Chen, 1992

Species of fish

Sinocyclocheilus brevis is a species of ray-finned fish in the genus Sinocyclocheilus. They live in temperate, freshwater climates in Asia. The maximum observed length is 12 cm (4.7 in).
