= Sinocyclocheilus guanduensis =

Scientific classification
- Kingdom: Animalia
- Phylum: Chordata
- Class: Actinopterygii
- Order: Cypriniformes
- Family: Cyprinidae
- Genus: Sinocyclocheilus
- Species: S. guanduensis

Binomial name
- Sinocyclocheilus guanduensis W. X. Li & H. Xiao, 2004

Species of fish

Sinocyclocheilus guanduensis is a species of cyprinid fish endemic to China.
