= Speolabeo hokhanhi =

Scientific classification
- Kingdom: Animalia
- Phylum: Chordata
- Class: Actinopterygii
- Order: Cypriniformes
- Family: Cyprinidae
- Genus: Speolabeo
- Species: S. hokhanhi

Binomial name
- Speolabeo hokhanhi D. T. Nguyen, L. Cao, S. Q. Deng & E. Zhang, 2018

Species of fish

Speolabeo hokhanhi is a species of freshwater ray-finned fish belonging to the family Cyprinidae, the family which also includes the carps, barbs, minnows and related fishes. This species is a cavefish that was described in 2018 from Hang Va Cave in Phong Nha – Kẻ Bàng National Park in the Son River basin) in Central Viet Nam.
