= Crossed-fork back golden-line fish =

Conservation status
- Vulnerable (IUCN 3.1)

Scientific classification
- Kingdom: Animalia
- Phylum: Chordata
- Class: Actinopterygii
- Order: Cypriniformes
- Family: Cyprinidae
- Subfamily: Cyprininae
- Genus: Sinocyclocheilus
- Species: S. furcodorsalis

Binomial name
- Sinocyclocheilus furcodorsalis Y. R. Chen, J. X. Yang & J. H. Lan, 1997
- Range in China in red

Synonyms
- Sinocyclocheilus tianeensis Li, Xiao & Luo, 2003

Species of fish

The crossed-fork back golden-line fish (Sinocyclocheilus furcodorsalis) is a species of blind cave fish in the family Cyprinidae. It is endemic to the Guangxi province in southern China, and only known from an underground stream in Tian'e County.

== Description ==
Sinocyclocheilus furcodorsalis grow to 8.8 cm (3.5 in) standard length. They are eyeless. The body is depigmented, semi-transparent and whitish in colour.
