= Typhlobarbus =

Conservation status
- Data Deficient (IUCN 3.1)

Scientific classification
- Kingdom: Animalia
- Phylum: Chordata
- Class: Actinopterygii
- Order: Cypriniformes
- Family: Cyprinidae
- Subfamily: Cyprininae
- Genus: Typhlobarbus; X. L. Chu & Y. R. Chen, 1982
- Species: T. nudiventris

Binomial name
- Typhlobarbus nudiventris X. L. Chu & Y. R. Chen, 1982

Species of fish

Typhlobarbus is a monospecific genus of freshwater, troglobitic ray-finned fish belonging to the family Cyprinidae, the carps, barbs and allied fishes. The only species in the genus is Typhlobarbus nudiventris, a species endemic to Jianshui County in Yunnan, China. Like other cavefish, it lacks pigmentation and its eyes are degenerated. It is the only species in its genus. It reaches up to about 4.6 cm (1.8 in) in standard length.
