= Speolabeo =

Scientific classification
- Kingdom: Animalia
- Phylum: Chordata
- Class: Actinopterygii
- Order: Cypriniformes
- Suborder: Cyprinoidei
- Family: Cyprinidae
- Subfamily: Labeoninae
- Genus: Speolabeo; Kottelat, 2017

Type species
- Bangana musaei Kottelat & Steiner, 2011

Species of fish

Speolabeo is a genus of freshwater ray-finned fish belonging to the family Cyprinidae, the family which also includes the carps, barbs, minnows and related fishes. The fishes in this genus are found in Viet Nam and Laos.

== Species ==
Speolabeo contains the following species:

- Speolabeo hokhanhi D. T. Nguyen, L. Cao, S. Q. Deng & E. Zhang, 2018
- Speolabeo musaei (Kottelat & Steiner, 2011)
