= Sinocyclocheilus longicornus =

Scientific classification
- Domain: Eukaryota
- Kingdom: Animalia
- Phylum: Chordata
- Class: Actinopterygii
- Order: Cypriniformes
- Family: Cyprinidae
- Genus: Sinocyclocheilus
- Species: S. longicornus

Binomial name
- Sinocyclocheilus longicornus Cheng Xu, Tao Luo, Jia-Jun Zhou, Li Wu, Xin-Rui Zhao, Hong-Fu Yang, Ning Xiao, Jiang Zhou, 2023

Species of fish

Sinocyclocheilus longicornus is a species of cave-adapted ray-finned fish in the family Cyprinidae. It is endemic to Guizhou province in China.
