= Sinocyclocheilus huangtianensis =

Scientific classification
- Kingdom: Animalia
- Phylum: Chordata
- Class: Actinopterygii
- Order: Cypriniformes
- Family: Cyprinidae
- Genus: Sinocyclocheilus
- Species: S. huangtianensis

Binomial name
- Sinocyclocheilus huangtianensis Zhu, Zhu & Lan, 2011

Species of fish

Sinocyclocheilus huangtianensis is a species of cyprinid fish. It is found in a cave of the Hejiang River (a tributary of the Pearl River) in Guangxi, China.
