= Protocobitis typhlops =

Conservation status
- Vulnerable (IUCN 2.3)

Scientific classification
- Kingdom: Animalia
- Phylum: Chordata
- Class: Actinopterygii
- Order: Cypriniformes
- Family: Cobitidae
- Genus: Protocobitis
- Species: P. typhlops

Binomial name
- Protocobitis typhlops J. X. Yang & Y. R. Chen, 1993

Species of fish

Protocobitis typhlops is a species of troglobitic loach endemic to Guangxi, China.
