= Draconectes =

Scientific classification
- Kingdom: Animalia
- Phylum: Chordata
- Class: Actinopterygii
- Order: Cypriniformes
- Family: Nemacheilidae
- Genus: Draconectes; Kottelat, 2012
- Species: D. narinosus

Binomial name
- Draconectes narinosus Kottelat, 2012

Species of fish

Draconectes is a genus of troglobitic stone loach known only from a cave on Van Gio Island in Halong Bay, Vietnam. The only species known in the genus is Draconectes narinosus.
