= Sinocyclocheilus altishoulderus =

Scientific classification
- Kingdom: Animalia
- Phylum: Chordata
- Class: Actinopterygii
- Order: Cypriniformes
- Family: Cyprinidae
- Subfamily: Cyprininae
- Genus: Sinocyclocheilus
- Species: S. altishoulderus

Binomial name
- Sinocyclocheilus altishoulderus (W. X. Li & J. H. Lan, 1992)

Synonyms
- Anchicyclocheilus altishoulderus Li & Lan, 1992

Species of fish

Sinocyclocheilus altishoulderus (common name: high-shoulder golden-line barbel) is a species of cave fish in the family Cyprinidae. It is endemic to Guangxi province in southern China, and only known from a cave in Donglan County, from a subterranean tributary of the Hongshui River, a tributary of the Pearl River.

== Description ==
Sinocyclocheilus altishoulderus grow to 22 cm (8.7 in) total length; mean length is much less, about 9.7 cm (3.8 in). The eyes are small. The body is hump-backed and depigmented, semi-transparent and whitish in colour.

== Ecology and behaviour ==
Ecology and behaviour of this species are unknown. It shares its habitat (and type locality) with another cave fish species, Sinocyclocheilus donglanensis.

Sinocyclocheilus altishoulderus is only known from the Donglan County in Guangxi, China

== Habitat and conservation ==
The type locality, near Gongping Village, Taiping Town, Donglan County, is a subterranean river some 10–20 metres inside from the mouth of a small cave. During the rainy season, the water can extend outside the cave to form a small lake. The habitat is potentially threatened by water extraction, waste disposal and pesticide pollution, and landscape alterations in general.
