= Sinocyclocheilus yaolanensis =

Scientific classification
- Domain: Eukaryota
- Kingdom: Animalia
- Phylum: Chordata
- Class: Actinopterygii
- Order: Cypriniformes
- Family: Cyprinidae
- Subfamily: Cyprininae
- Genus: Sinocyclocheilus
- Species: S. yaolanensis

Binomial name
- Sinocyclocheilus yaolanensis J. Zhou, X. Z. Li & X. F. Hou, 2009

Species of fish

Sinocyclocheilus yaolanensis is a species of ray-finned fish in the genus Sinocyclocheilus.
