= Speonectes =

Conservation status
- Critically endangered, possibly extinct (IUCN 3.1)

Scientific classification
- Kingdom: Animalia
- Phylum: Chordata
- Class: Actinopterygii
- Order: Cypriniformes
- Family: Nemacheilidae
- Genus: Speonectes
- Species: S. tiomanensis

Binomial name
- Speonectes tiomanensis (Kottelat, 1990)

Synonyms
- Sundoreonectes tiomanensis Kottelat, 1990

Species of fish

Speonectes tiomanensis is a species of stone loach that is endemic to Malaysia and only known from a cave on Tioman Island. This fish reaches a length of 5.8 centimetres (2.3 in) SL. This species is the only known member of its genus, but it was formerly included in Sundoreonectes. It is the only cavefish known from Malaysia.
