= Sinocyclocheilus lateristriatus =

Conservation status
- Vulnerable (IUCN 3.1)

Scientific classification
- Kingdom: Animalia
- Phylum: Chordata
- Class: Actinopterygii
- Order: Cypriniformes
- Family: Cyprinidae
- Subfamily: Cyprininae
- Genus: Sinocyclocheilus
- Species: S. lateristriatus

Binomial name
- Sinocyclocheilus lateristriatus W. X. Li, 1992

Species of fish

Sinocyclocheilus lateristriatus is a species of ray-finned fish in the family Cyprinidae. It is endemic to Luliang County, Yunnan in China, where it is a stygophile living in the outlet of a subterranean river.
