= Sinocyclocheilus wui =

Scientific classification
- Domain: Eukaryota
- Kingdom: Animalia
- Phylum: Chordata
- Class: Actinopterygii
- Order: Cypriniformes
- Family: Cyprinidae
- Subfamily: Cyprininae
- Genus: Sinocyclocheilus
- Species: S. wui

Binomial name
- Sinocyclocheilus wui Li & Li, 2013

Species of fish

Sinocyclocheilus wui is an Asian freshwater species of ray-finned fish in the genus Sinocyclocheilus. It is benthopelagic, and is found in China.
