= Sinocyclocheilus jii =

Conservation status
- Least Concern (IUCN 3.1)

Scientific classification
- Kingdom: Animalia
- Phylum: Chordata
- Class: Actinopterygii
- Order: Cypriniformes
- Family: Cyprinidae
- Subfamily: Cyprininae
- Genus: Sinocyclocheilus
- Species: S. jii

Binomial name
- Sinocyclocheilus jii C. G. Zhang & D. Y. Dai, 1992

Species of fish

Sinocyclocheilus jii is a species of ray-finned fish in the genus Sinocyclocheilus.
