= Hyaline fish =

Conservation status
- Critically Endangered (IUCN 3.1)

Scientific classification
- Kingdom: Animalia
- Phylum: Chordata
- Class: Actinopterygii
- Order: Cypriniformes
- Family: Cyprinidae
- Subfamily: Cyprininae
- Genus: Sinocyclocheilus
- Species: S. hyalinus

Binomial name
- Sinocyclocheilus hyalinus Y. R. Chen & J. X. Yang, 1993

Species of fish

The hyaline fish (Sinocyclocheilus hyalinus) is a species of ray-finned fish in the family Cyprinidae. This threatened species is found only in Yunnan in China. Like many other cavefish, it lacks scales, pigmentation and external eyes. The first recorded description of an obligate cavefish involved this species, when mentioned in 1540 in the travel notes of Yingjing Xie, a local governor of Guangxi.
