= Iraq blind barb =

Conservation status
- Critically Endangered (IUCN 3.1)

Scientific classification
- Kingdom: Animalia
- Phylum: Chordata
- Class: Actinopterygii
- Order: Cypriniformes
- Family: Cyprinidae
- Genus: Garra
- Species: G. widdowsoni

Binomial name
- Garra widdowsoni (Trewavas, 1955)

Synonyms
- Typhlogarra widdowsoni Trewavas, 1955

Species of fish

Garra widdowsoni, commonly known as the Iraq blind barb or Haditha cave garra, is a species of cyprinid fish endemic to underground water systems near Haditha in Iraq. Although traditionally placed in its own genus Typhlogarra, this is not supported by genetic evidence, leading to its move to genus Garra. This cavefish is considered critically endangered because of water extraction, which has lowered the groundwater level. Once abundant, a survey in 2012 found that it now was very rare. Another species from the same place, Caecocypris basimi, may already be extinct. The only other known cavefish in Iraq is Eidinemacheilus proudlovei.
