= Speolabeo musaei =

Conservation status
- Vulnerable (IUCN 3.1)

Scientific classification
- Kingdom: Animalia
- Phylum: Chordata
- Class: Actinopterygii
- Order: Cypriniformes
- Family: Cyprinidae
- Subfamily: Labeoninae
- Genus: Speolabeo
- Species: S. musaei

Binomial name
- Speolabeo musaei (Kottelat & Steiner, 2011)

Synonyms
- Bangana musaei Kottelat & Steiner, 2011

Species of fish

Speolabeo musaei is a species of freshwater ray-finned fish belonging to the family Cyprinidae, the family which also includes the carps, barbs, minnows and related fishes. This species is a cavefish endemic to the Xe Bang Fai River in Laos.
