= Prietella phreatophila =

Conservation status
- Vulnerable (IUCN 3.1)

- Endangered (ESA)

Scientific classification
- Kingdom: Animalia
- Phylum: Chordata
- Class: Actinopterygii
- Order: Siluriformes
- Family: Ictaluridae
- Genus: Prietella
- Species: P. phreatophila

Binomial name
- Prietella phreatophila Carranza, 1954

Species of fish

The Mexican blindcat (Prietella phreatophila), in Spanish bagre de muzquiz, is a species of North American freshwater catfish (family Ictaluridae). Until recently, it was believed to be endemic to Coahuila in the Rio Bravo drainage in northern Mexico; however, in 2016 the species was reported from the Amistad National Recreation Area, Texas, following earlier, unconfirmed sightings of blind, white catfish in the area. The captured specimens were brought to the San Antonio Zoo and Aquarium.

== Description ==
This fish is pinkish white in color and has no eyes. It grows up to 9.2 cm (3.6 in) in total length. The dorsal fin has no spine. The adipose fin is joined to the caudal fin, which is unforked.

== Habitat and conservation ==
The species lives only in subterranean waters and can be encountered in caves and wells. In Mexico, it is known from 12 locations. It is threatened by pollution of the groundwater and groundwater extraction. The Mexican blindcat's singular habitat in the karst aquifers is highly vulnerable to human activities, including over-extraction and contamination, that undermine the fragile ecological equilibrium of its habitat. All these factors have resulted in the species being declared vulnerable.
