= Small eye golden-line fish =

Conservation status
- Vulnerable (IUCN 2.3)

Scientific classification
- Kingdom: Animalia
- Phylum: Chordata
- Class: Actinopterygii
- Order: Cypriniformes
- Family: Cyprinidae
- Subfamily: Cyprininae
- Genus: Sinocyclocheilus
- Species: S. microphthalmus

Binomial name
- Sinocyclocheilus microphthalmus G. L. Li, 1989

Species of fish

The small eye golden-line fish (Sinocyclocheilus microphthalmus) is a species of ray-finned fish in the family Cyprinidae. It is a cavefish endemic to the karst regions of Guangxi, China. As a stygobite, the species is adapted to subterranean life, exhibiting significant morphological variation across different cave populations.

== Morphology ==
A 2025 study identified two distinct morphotypes within the species based on their specific cave environments. Populations living in partially lit, food-rich caves exhibit a "robust" humpback form with larger (though still reduced) eyes. In contrast, populations inhabiting deep, aphotic (lightless) zones with scarce resources develop a "gracile" form characterized by a slender body and severely regressed eyes.

== Genetics ==
S. microphthalmus possesses an allotetraploid genome, resulting from the hybridization and genome duplication of two ancestral species approximately 17.66 million years ago. Whole-genome sequencing indicates that this genome duplication has facilitated adaptation to extreme cave environments. The species shows signs of relaxed selection on genes associated with vision (leading to eye regression) and positive selection on genes related to non-visual sensory systems and metabolism.
