= Sinocyclocheilus robustus =

Scientific classification
- Domain: Eukaryota
- Kingdom: Animalia
- Phylum: Chordata
- Class: Actinopterygii
- Order: Cypriniformes
- Family: Cyprinidae
- Subfamily: Cyprininae
- Genus: Sinocyclocheilus
- Species: S. robustus

Binomial name
- Sinocyclocheilus robustus J. X. Chen & Z. F. Zhao, 1988

Species of fish

Sinocyclocheilus robustus is an Asian freshwater species of ray-finned fish in the genus Sinocyclocheilus. It is benthopelagic and is found in China.
