= Sinocyclocheilus tianlinensis =

Scientific classification
- Domain: Eukaryota
- Kingdom: Animalia
- Phylum: Chordata
- Class: Actinopterygii
- Order: Cypriniformes
- Family: Cyprinidae
- Subfamily: Cyprininae
- Genus: Sinocyclocheilus
- Species: S. tianlinensis

Binomial name
- Sinocyclocheilus tianlinensis Jie Zhao, C. G. Zhang & A. Y. He, 2004

Species of fish

Sinocyclocheilus tianlinensis is a species of cyprinid fish in the genus Sinocyclocheilus.
