= Sinocyclocheilus tileihornes =

Scientific classification
- Kingdom: Animalia
- Phylum: Chordata
- Class: Actinopterygii
- Order: Cypriniformes
- Family: Cyprinidae
- Subfamily: Cyprininae
- Genus: Sinocyclocheilus
- Species: S. tileihornes

Binomial name
- Sinocyclocheilus tileihornes W. N. Mao, Zong-Min Lu & W. X. Li, 2003

Species of fish

Sinocyclocheilus tileihornes is a species of freshwater ray-finned fish in the genus Sinocyclocheilus. It is indigenous to Asia and, like most fish of the Sinocyclocheilus genus, lives primarily in or around caves.
