= Karstsinnectes acridorsalis =

Conservation status
- Critically Endangered (IUCN 3.1)

Scientific classification
- Kingdom: Animalia
- Phylum: Chordata
- Class: Actinopterygii
- Order: Cypriniformes
- Family: Nemacheilidae
- Genus: Karstsinnectes
- Species: K. acridorsalis

Binomial name
- Karstsinnectes acridorsalis (J. H. Lan, 2013)

Synonyms
- Oreonectes acridorsalis J. H. Lan, 2013

Species of fish

Karstsinnectes acridorsalis is a species of cyprinid of the genus Karstsinnectes. It inhabits caves in Guangxi, China. It grows to a maximum length of 4.8 centimetres (1.9 in) and it is considered harmless to humans. It was described by Lan in 2013 and has been classified on the IUCN Red List as Critically Endangered.
