= Gold-colored angle fish =

Conservation status
- Vulnerable (IUCN 2.3)

Scientific classification
- Kingdom: Animalia
- Phylum: Chordata
- Class: Actinopterygii
- Order: Cypriniformes
- Family: Cyprinidae
- Genus: Sinocyclocheilus
- Species: S. angularis

Binomial name
- Sinocyclocheilus angularis J. Z. Zheng & J. Wang, 1990

Species of fish

The gold-colored angle fish (Sinocyclocheilus angularis) is a species of cyprinid fish.

It is found only in China.
