= Sinocyclocheilus lingyunensis =

Scientific classification
- Kingdom: Animalia
- Phylum: Chordata
- Class: Actinopterygii
- Order: Cypriniformes
- Family: Cyprinidae
- Subfamily: Cyprininae
- Genus: Sinocyclocheilus
- Species: S. lingyunensis

Binomial name
- Sinocyclocheilus lingyunensis W. X. Li, H. Xiao & Z. F. Luo, 2000

Species of fish

Sinocyclocheilus lingyunensis is a species of ray-finned fish in the genus Sinocyclocheilus.
