= Sinocyclocheilus cyphotergous =

Conservation status
- Least Concern (IUCN 3.1)

Scientific classification
- Kingdom: Animalia
- Phylum: Chordata
- Class: Actinopterygii
- Division: Teleostei
- Order: Cypriniformes
- Family: Cyprinidae
- Genus: Sinocyclocheilus
- Species: S. cyphotergous

Binomial name
- Sinocyclocheilus cyphotergous (Dai, 1988)

Synonyms
- Gibbibarbus cyphotergous Dai, 1988

Species of fish

Sinocyclocheilus cyphotergous is a species of ray-finned fish in the genus Sinocyclocheilus.
