= Protocobitis anteroventris =

Scientific classification
- Kingdom: Animalia
- Phylum: Chordata
- Class: Actinopterygii
- Order: Cypriniformes
- Family: Cobitidae
- Genus: Protocobitis
- Species: P. anteroventris

Binomial name
- Protocobitis anteroventris Lan, 2013

Species of fish

Protocobitis anteroventris is a species of loach within the family Cobitidae. Lengths of the species include the holotype measuring 75.7 millimeters, and further paratypes measuring 64.6, 71, and 71.8 millimeters. The distribution, only known from the type localities of these specimens, is a cave at Lingping Town, Tianlin County, Guangxi, China at an elevation of 830 meters.
