= Sinocyclocheilus qiubeiensis =

Scientific classification
- Kingdom: Animalia
- Phylum: Chordata
- Class: Actinopterygii
- Order: Cypriniformes
- Family: Cyprinidae
- Subfamily: Cyprininae
- Genus: Sinocyclocheilus
- Species: S. qiubeiensis

Binomial name
- Sinocyclocheilus qiubeiensis W. X. Li, 2002

Synonyms
- Sinocyclocheilus jiuchengensis Li, 2002

Species of fish

Sinocyclocheilus qiubeiensis is a species of ray-finned fish in the genus Sinocyclocheilus.
