= Sinocyclocheilus hugeibarbus =

Scientific classification
- Kingdom: Animalia
- Phylum: Chordata
- Class: Actinopterygii
- Order: Cypriniformes
- Family: Cyprinidae
- Subfamily: Cyprininae
- Genus: Sinocyclocheilus
- Species: S. hugeibarbus

Binomial name
- Sinocyclocheilus hugeibarbus W. X. Li & J. C. Ran, 2003

Species of fish

Sinocyclocheilus hugeibarbus is a species of ray-finned fish in the genus Sinocyclocheilus.
