= Sinocyclocheilus brevibarbatus =

Scientific classification
- Kingdom: Animalia
- Phylum: Chordata
- Class: Actinopterygii
- Order: Cypriniformes
- Family: Cyprinidae
- Subfamily: Cyprininae
- Genus: Sinocyclocheilus
- Species: S. brevibarbatus

Binomial name
- Sinocyclocheilus brevibarbatus Y. H. Zhao, J. H. Lan & C. G. Zhang, 2008

Species of fish

Sinocyclocheilus brevibarbatus is a species of cyprinid fish in the genus Sinocyclocheilus.
