= Donglan County =

Donglan County 东兰县 • Dunghlanz Yen Tunglan
- County
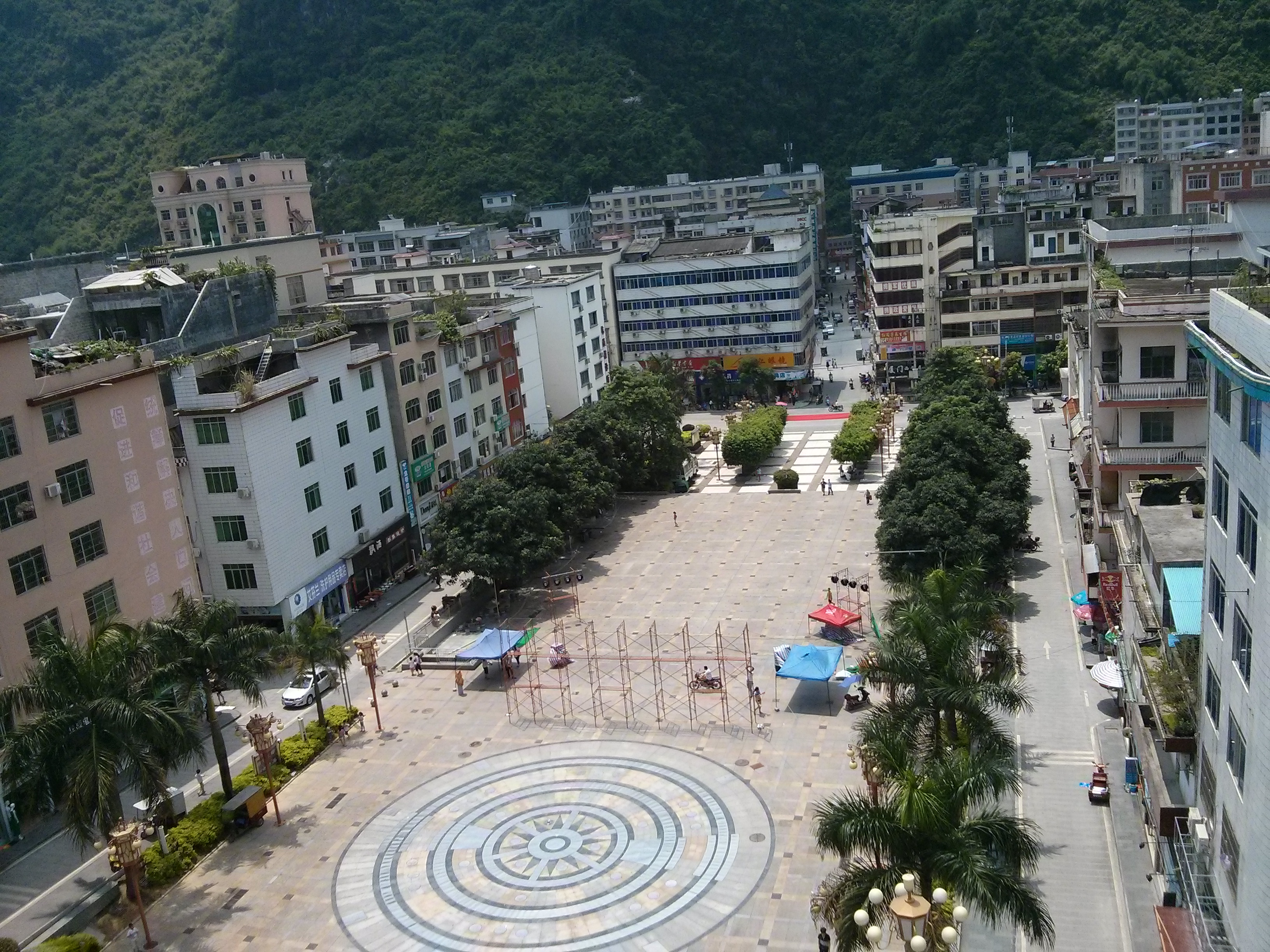

- Location of the seat in Guangxi
- Coordinates: 24°31′N 107°22′E
- Country: China
- Region: Guangxi
- Prefecture-level city: Hechi
- County seat: Donglan Town (东兰镇)

Area
  - Total: 2,435 km^{2} (940 sq mi)
- Elevation: 260 m (850 ft)

Population (2020)
  - Total: 219,549
  - Density: 90.16/km^{2} (233.5/sq mi)
- Time zone: UTC+8 (China Standard)
- Website: archived link

Donglan County (simplified Chinese: 东兰县; traditional Chinese: 東蘭縣; pinyin: Dōnglán Xiàn, Zhuang: Dunghlanz Yen) is a county of northwest Guangxi, China. It is under the administration of Hechi City.

Donglan County has given its name to the Donglan golden-line barbel (Sinocyclocheilus donglanensis), a small fish that is only known from one cave in Donglan.

== Administrative divisions ==
There are 6 towns, 7 townships and 1 ethnic township in the county:

Towns

Donglan Town (东兰镇), Aidong (隘洞镇), Changle (长乐镇), Sanshi (三石镇), Wuzhuan (武篆镇), Changjiang (长江镇)

Townships

Simeng Township (泗孟乡), Lanmu Township (兰木乡), Bachou Township (巴畴乡), Jingu Township (金谷乡), Datong Township (大同乡), Huaxiang Township (花香乡), Chuxue Township (切学乡)

Ethnic township

Sannong Yao Ethnic Township (三弄瑶族乡)

== Climate ==
Climate data for Donglan, elevation 249 m (817 ft), (1991–2020 normals, extremes 1981–2010)
Month	Jan	Feb	Mar	Apr	May	Jun	Jul	Aug	Sep	Oct	Nov	Dec	Year
Record high °C (°F)	29.0 (84.2)	33.4 (92.1)	35.9 (96.6)	36.9 (98.4)	38.1 (100.6)	37.1 (98.8)	38.0 (100.4)	38.0 (100.4)	38.2 (100.8)	34.8 (94.6)	32.0 (89.6)	29.6 (85.3)	38.2 (100.8)
Mean daily maximum °C (°F)	15.5 (59.9)	18.2 (64.8)	21.6 (70.9)	26.8 (80.2)	29.9 (85.8)	31.5 (88.7)	32.7 (90.9)	33.0 (91.4)	31.1 (88.0)	27.0 (80.6)	23.0 (73.4)	17.9 (64.2)	25.7 (78.2)
Daily mean °C (°F)	11.3 (52.3)	13.6 (56.5)	16.9 (62.4)	21.6 (70.9)	24.5 (76.1)	26.4 (79.5)	27.2 (81.0)	26.8 (80.2)	24.9 (76.8)	21.1 (70.0)	17.1 (62.8)	12.6 (54.7)	20.3 (68.6)
Mean daily minimum °C (°F)	8.7 (47.7)	10.8 (51.4)	14.0 (57.2)	18.2 (64.8)	21.1 (70.0)	23.4 (74.1)	24.0 (75.2)	23.5 (74.3)	21.4 (70.5)	17.9 (64.2)	13.7 (56.7)	9.4 (48.9)	17.2 (62.9)
Record low °C (°F)	−1.0 (30.2)	0.1 (32.2)	2.0 (35.6)	7.8 (46.0)	11.2 (52.2)	14.8 (58.6)	17.5 (63.5)	19.4 (66.9)	13.2 (55.8)	7.6 (45.7)	2.9 (37.2)	−1.7 (28.9)	−1.7 (28.9)
Average precipitation mm (inches)	38.6 (1.52)	29.5 (1.16)	62.4 (2.46)	96.3 (3.79)	232.9 (9.17)	375.9 (14.80)	300.7 (11.84)	201.2 (7.92)	114.8 (4.52)	92.3 (3.63)	51.6 (2.03)	34.1 (1.34)	1,630.3 (64.18)
Average precipitation days (≥ 0.1 mm)	12.0	10.4	14.0	13.8	16.1	19.1	19.9	16.2	10.9	9.8	9.0	8.2	159.4
Average snowy days	0.2	0	0	0	0	0	0	0	0	0	0	0.2	0.4
Average relative humidity (%)	79	78	78	78	81	85	84	84	82	82	81	78	81
Mean monthly sunshine hours	47.6	59.5	69.9	107.8	135.2	123.2	160.4	179.2	153.7	118.9	102.2	81.4	1,339
Percentage possible sunshine	14	19	19	28	33	30	39	45	42	33	31	25	30
Source: China Meteorological Administration
