= Sinocyclocheilus aquihornes =

Conservation status
- Endangered (IUCN 3.1)

Scientific classification
- Kingdom: Animalia
- Phylum: Chordata
- Class: Actinopterygii
- Order: Cypriniformes
- Family: Cyprinidae
- Subfamily: Cyprininae
- Genus: Sinocyclocheilus
- Species: S. aquihornes

Binomial name
- Sinocyclocheilus aquihornes W. X. Li & H. F. Yang, 2007

Species of fish

Sinocyclocheilus aquihornes is a species of cyprinid fish in the genus Sinocyclocheilus.
