= Sinocyclocheilus xunlensis =

Scientific classification
- Kingdom: Animalia
- Phylum: Chordata
- Class: Actinopterygii
- Order: Cypriniformes
- Family: Cyprinidae
- Subfamily: Cyprininae
- Genus: Sinocyclocheilus
- Species: S. xunlensis

Binomial name
- Sinocyclocheilus xunlensis J. H. Lan, Y. H. Zhao & C. G. Zhang, 2004

Species of fish

Sinocyclocheilus xunlensis is a species of cyprinid fish in the genus Sinocyclocheilus.
