= Pterocryptis cucphuongensis =

Conservation status
- Data Deficient (IUCN 3.1)

Scientific classification
- Kingdom: Animalia
- Phylum: Chordata
- Class: Actinopterygii
- Order: Siluriformes
- Family: Siluridae
- Genus: Pterocryptis
- Species: P. cucphuongensis

Binomial name
- Pterocryptis cucphuongensis (Mai, 1978)

Synonyms
- Silurus cucphuongensis Mai, 1978

Species of catfish

Pterocryptis cucphuongensis is a species of catfish found in Vietnam.

This species reaches a length of 9.0 cm (3.5 in).

== Etymology ==
The fish is named in honor of a cave in Cúc Phương National Park, in northern Vietnam, which is the type locality.
