= Sinocyclocheilus broadihornes =

Conservation status
- Endangered (IUCN 3.1)

Scientific classification
- Kingdom: Animalia
- Phylum: Chordata
- Class: Actinopterygii
- Order: Cypriniformes
- Family: Cyprinidae
- Subfamily: Cyprininae
- Genus: Sinocyclocheilus
- Species: S. broadihornes

Binomial name
- Sinocyclocheilus broadihornes W. X. Li & W. N. Mao, 2007

Species of fish

Sinocyclocheilus broadihornes is a species of cyprinid fish in the genus Sinocyclocheilus.
