= Duck-billed golden-line fish =

Conservation status
- Vulnerable (IUCN 3.1)

Scientific classification
- Kingdom: Animalia
- Phylum: Chordata
- Class: Actinopterygii
- Division: Teleostei
- Order: Cypriniformes
- Family: Cyprinidae
- Subfamily: Cyprininae
- Genus: Sinocyclocheilus
- Species: S. anatirostris

Binomial name
- Sinocyclocheilus anatirostris R. D. Lin & Z. F. Luo, 1986

Synonyms
- Sinocyclocheilus guangxiensis Zhou & Li, 1998; Sinocyclocheilus albeoguttatus Zhou & Li, 1998

Species of fish

The duck-billed golden-line fish (Sinocyclocheilus anatirostris) is a species of cyprinid. It is found only in China.
