= Pseudosinocyclocheilus =

Scientific classification
- Kingdom: Animalia
- Phylum: Chordata
- Class: Actinopterygii
- Order: Cypriniformes
- Family: Cyprinidae
- Subfamily: Cyprininae
- Genus: Pseudosinocyclocheilus; Zhang & Zhao, 2016
- Species: P. jinxiensis

Binomial name
- Pseudosinocyclocheilus jinxiensis (H. F. Zheng, L. H. Xiu & J. Yang, 2013)

Synonyms
- Sinocyclocheilus jinxiensis Zheng, Xiu & Yang, 2013

Genus of fish

Pseudosinocyclocheilus is a monospecific genus of freshwater ray-finned fish belonging to the family Cyprinidae, the family which includes the carps, barbs, minnows and related fishes. The only species in the genus is Pseudosinocyclocheilus jinxiensis, a species of cavefish endemic to Xiaolong Spring in Jinxi County, Guangxi, China. In 2016, it was proposed that this species should be placed in its own genus Pseudosinocyclocheilus, a move subsequently supported by Catalog of Fishes and FishBase.
