= Eyeless golden-line fish =

Conservation status
- Vulnerable (IUCN 2.3)

Scientific classification
- Kingdom: Animalia
- Phylum: Chordata
- Class: Actinopterygii
- Order: Cypriniformes
- Family: Cyprinidae
- Genus: Sinocyclocheilus
- Species: S. anophthalmus

Binomial name
- Sinocyclocheilus anophthalmus Y. R. Chen, X. L. Chu, Z. Y. Luo & J. Y. Wu, 1988

Species of fish

The eyeless golden-line fish or blind golden-line barbel (Sinocyclocheilus anophthalmus) is a species of ray-finned fish in the family Cyprinidae. It is a cave-dwelling, blind species only known from the Yiliang County, Yunnan, China. Its maximum length is 113 mm (4.4 in) SL.
