= Sinocyclocheilus flexuosdorsalis =

Scientific classification
- Domain: Eukaryota
- Kingdom: Animalia
- Phylum: Chordata
- Class: Actinopterygii
- Order: Cypriniformes
- Family: Cyprinidae
- Genus: Sinocyclocheilus
- Species: S. flexuosdorsalis

Binomial name
- Sinocyclocheilus flexuosdorsalis Zhu & Zhu, 2012

Species of fish

Sinocyclocheilus flexuosdorsalis is a species of ray-finned fish in the genus Sinocyclocheilus.
