= Sinocyclocheilus guanyangensis =

Scientific classification
- Kingdom: Animalia
- Phylum: Chordata
- Class: Actinopterygii
- Order: Cypriniformes
- Family: Cyprinidae
- Subfamily: Cyprininae
- Genus: Sinocyclocheilus
- Species: S. guanyangensis

Binomial name
- Sinocyclocheilus guanyangensis Y. Q. Chen, C. L. Peng & E. Zhang, 2016

Species of fish

Sinocyclocheilus guanyangensis is a species of freshwater ray-finned fish from the family Cyprinidae. It is endemic to the Li-Jiang Basin in Guanyang County in Guanxi. It has vestigial eyes, a conical snout and lacks a hump at the back of the head.
