= Sinocyclocheilus macroscalus =

Scientific classification
- Domain: Eukaryota
- Kingdom: Animalia
- Phylum: Chordata
- Class: Actinopterygii
- Order: Cypriniformes
- Family: Cyprinidae
- Subfamily: Cyprininae
- Genus: Sinocyclocheilus
- Species: S. macroscalus

Binomial name
- Sinocyclocheilus macroscalus Shen et al., 2000

Species of fish

Sinocyclocheilus macroscalus is a species of ray-finned fish in the genus Sinocyclocheilus.
