= Golden-line barbel =

Conservation status
- Critically Endangered (IUCN 3.1)

Scientific classification
- Kingdom: Animalia
- Phylum: Chordata
- Class: Actinopterygii
- Order: Cypriniformes
- Family: Cyprinidae
- Subfamily: Cyprininae
- Genus: Sinocyclocheilus
- Species: S. grahami

Binomial name
- Sinocyclocheilus grahami (Regan, 1904)

Synonyms
- Barbus grahami Regan, 1904; Percocypris grahami (Regan, 1904); Sinocyclocheilus grahami grahami (Regan, 1904)

Species of fish

The golden-line barbel (Sinocyclocheilus grahami) is a species of cyprinid fish endemic to Dian Lake and its tributaries in Yunnan, China. It has been extirpated from the lake itself due to heavy pollution, but survives in a single tributary and a few small temple ponds. This species can reach a length of 23 centimetres (9.1 in) though most are only around 17 centimetres (6.7 in). The greatest weight known for this species is 250 grams (8.8 oz).

== See also ==
- List of endangered and protected species of China
