= Karstsinnectes anophthalmus =

Conservation status
- Vulnerable (IUCN 3.1)

Scientific classification
- Kingdom: Animalia
- Phylum: Chordata
- Class: Actinopterygii
- Order: Cypriniformes
- Family: Nemacheilidae
- Genus: Karstsinnectes
- Species: K. anophthalmus

Binomial name
- Karstsinnectes anophthalmus (B. S. Zheng, 1981)

Synonyms
- Oreonectes anophthalmus B. S. Zheng, 1981

Species of fish

Karstsinnectes anophthalmus is a species of ray-finned fish in the family Nemacheilidae. This cavefish is found only in Guangxi and Guizhou in China. It grows to 3.7 cm (1.5 in) standard length.
