= Sinocyclocheilus bicornutus =

Conservation status
- Vulnerable (IUCN 3.1)

Scientific classification
- Kingdom: Animalia
- Phylum: Chordata
- Class: Actinopterygii
- Order: Cypriniformes
- Family: Cyprinidae
- Subfamily: Cyprininae
- Genus: Sinocyclocheilus
- Species: S. bicornutus

Binomial name
- Sinocyclocheilus bicornutus D. Z. Wang & J. W. Liao, 1997

Species of fish

Sinocyclocheilus bicornutus is a species of ray-finned fish in the genus Sinocyclocheilus.
