= Sinocyclocheilus jiuxuensis =

Scientific classification
- Kingdom: Animalia
- Phylum: Chordata
- Class: Actinopterygii
- Order: Cypriniformes
- Family: Cyprinidae
- Subfamily: Cyprininae
- Genus: Sinocyclocheilus
- Species: S. jiuxuensis

Binomial name
- Sinocyclocheilus jiuxuensis W. X. Li & J. H. Lan, 2003

Species of fish

Sinocyclocheilus jiuxuensis is a species of ray-finned fish in the genus Sinocyclocheilus.
