= Sinocyclocheilus luopingensis =

Conservation status
- Critically endangered, possibly extinct (IUCN 3.1)

Scientific classification
- Kingdom: Animalia
- Phylum: Chordata
- Class: Actinopterygii
- Order: Cypriniformes
- Family: Cyprinidae
- Subfamily: Cyprininae
- Genus: Sinocyclocheilus
- Species: S. luopingensis

Binomial name
- Sinocyclocheilus luopingensis W. X. Li & J. N. Tao, 2002

Species of fish

Sinocyclocheilus luopingensis is a species of ray-finned fish in the genus Sinocyclocheilus.
