= Sinocyclocheilus mashanensis =

Scientific classification
- Domain: Eukaryota
- Kingdom: Animalia
- Phylum: Chordata
- Class: Actinopterygii
- Order: Cypriniformes
- Family: Cyprinidae
- Subfamily: Cyprininae
- Genus: Sinocyclocheilus
- Species: S. mashanensis

Binomial name
- Sinocyclocheilus mashanensis Wu, Liao & Li, 2010

Species of fish

Sinocyclocheilus mashanensis is a species of ray-finned fish in the genus Sinocyclocheilus.
