= Sundoreonectes =

Scientific classification
- Kingdom: Animalia
- Phylum: Chordata
- Class: Actinopterygii
- Order: Cypriniformes
- Family: Nemacheilidae
- Genus: Sundoreonectes; Kottelat, 1990

Type species
- Noemacheilus obesus Vaillant, 1902

Genus of fishes

Sundoreonectes is a genus consisting of two species of stone loaches from the southeast Asian island of Borneo.

== Species ==
There are currently two recognized species in this genus, but the single Speonectes species was formerly included in Sundoreonectes.

- Sundoreonectes obesus (Vaillant, 1902)
- Sundoreonectes sabanus (P. K. Chin, 1990)
