= Sinocyclocheilus luolouensis =

Scientific classification
- Kingdom: Animalia
- Phylum: Chordata
- Class: Actinopterygii
- Order: Cypriniformes
- Family: Cyprinidae
- Subfamily: Cyprininae
- Genus: Sinocyclocheilus
- Species: S. luolouensis

Binomial name
- Sinocyclocheilus luolouensis Lan, 2013

Species of fish

Sinocyclocheilus luolouensis is a species of ray-finned fish in the genus Sinocyclocheilus.
