= Sinocyclocheilus macrophthalmus =

Scientific classification
- Kingdom: Animalia
- Phylum: Chordata
- Class: Actinopterygii
- Order: Cypriniformes
- Family: Cyprinidae
- Subfamily: Cyprininae
- Genus: Sinocyclocheilus
- Species: S. macrophthalmus

Binomial name
- Sinocyclocheilus macrophthalmus C. G. Zhang & Y. H. Zhao, 2001

Species of fish

Sinocyclocheilus macrophthalmus is a species of ray-finned fish in the genus Sinocyclocheilus.
