= Sinocyclocheilus longibarbatus =

Scientific classification
- Kingdom: Animalia
- Phylum: Chordata
- Class: Actinopterygii
- Order: Cypriniformes
- Family: Cyprinidae
- Subfamily: Cyprininae
- Genus: Sinocyclocheilus
- Species: S. longibarbatus

Binomial name
- Sinocyclocheilus longibarbatus D. Z. Wang & Yi-Yu Chen, 1989

Species of fish

Sinocyclocheilus longibarbatus is a species of ray-finned fish in the genus Sinocyclocheilus.
