= Sinocyclocheilus aluensis =

Conservation status
- Vulnerable (IUCN 3.1)

Scientific classification
- Kingdom: Animalia
- Phylum: Chordata
- Class: Actinopterygii
- Order: Cypriniformes
- Family: Cyprinidae
- Genus: Sinocyclocheilus
- Species: S. aluensis

Binomial name
- Sinocyclocheilus aluensis Li & Xiao, 2005

Species of fish

Sinocyclocheilus aluensis is a species of ray-finned fish in the genus Sinocyclocheilus.
