= Sinocyclocheilus purpureus =

Scientific classification
- Kingdom: Animalia
- Phylum: Chordata
- Class: Actinopterygii
- Order: Cypriniformes
- Family: Cyprinidae
- Subfamily: Cyprininae
- Genus: Sinocyclocheilus
- Species: S. purpureus

Binomial name
- Sinocyclocheilus purpureus W. X. Li, 1985

Species of fish

Sinocyclocheilus purpureus is a species of ray-finned fish in the genus Sinocyclocheilus.
