= Sinocyclocheilus anshuiensis =

Scientific classification
- Domain: Eukaryota
- Kingdom: Animalia
- Phylum: Chordata
- Class: Actinopterygii
- Order: Cypriniformes
- Family: Cyprinidae
- Subfamily: Cyprininae
- Genus: Sinocyclocheilus
- Species: S. anshuiensis

Binomial name
- Sinocyclocheilus anshuiensis Gan, Wu, Wei & Yang, 2013

Species of fish

Sinocyclocheilus anshuiensis is a species of ray-finned fish in the genus Sinocyclocheilus.
