= Sinocyclocheilus yishanensis =

Scientific classification
- Kingdom: Animalia
- Phylum: Chordata
- Class: Actinopterygii
- Order: Cypriniformes
- Family: Cyprinidae
- Subfamily: Cyprininae
- Genus: Sinocyclocheilus
- Species: S. yishanensis

Binomial name
- Sinocyclocheilus yishanensis W. X. Li & J. H. Lan, 1992

Species of fish

Sinocyclocheilus yishanensis (common name: Yishan golden-line barbel) is a species of cave fish in the family Cyprinidae. It is endemic to Guangxi province in southern China and known from the Liu River, a tributary of the Pearl River. Its specific name yishanensis refers to the Yishan County (now called Yizhou) where its type locality is.

== Description ==
It grows to 18.3 cm (7.2 in) standard length and has a scaled, slightly humpbacked body.

== Habitat ==
The type locality was a subterranean river that has now been changed into a reservoir.

Sinocyclocheilus yishanensis is only known from Yizhou, Guangxi, China
