= Sinocyclocheilus rhinocerous =

Scientific classification
- Kingdom: Animalia
- Phylum: Chordata
- Class: Actinopterygii
- Order: Cypriniformes
- Family: Cyprinidae
- Subfamily: Cyprininae
- Genus: Sinocyclocheilus
- Species: S. rhinocerous

Binomial name
- Sinocyclocheilus rhinocerous W. X. Li & J. N. Tao, 1994

Species of fish

Sinocyclocheilus rhinocerous is a species of ray-finned fish in the genus Sinocyclocheilus.
