= Photophobia (biology) =

Negative response to light

In biology, photophobia (adjective: photophobic) is negative response to light.

Photophobia is a behavior demonstrated by insects or other animals which seek to stay out of the light.

In botany, the term photophobia/photophobic describes shade-loving plants (sciophytes) that thrive in low light conditions.

Photophobia (or photophobic response) may also refer to a negative phototaxis or phototropism response.
