= Homatula =

Scientific classification
- Kingdom: Animalia
- Phylum: Chordata
- Class: Actinopterygii
- Division: Teleostei
- Order: Cypriniformes
- Family: Nemacheilidae
- Genus: Homatula; Nichols, 1925

Type species
- Nemachilus potanini Günther, 1896

Genus of fishes

Homatula is a genus of stone loaches endemic to China.

== Species ==
These are the currently recognized species in this genus:

- Homatula acuticephala (W. Zhou & J. C. He, 1993)
- Homatula anguillioides (S. Q. Zhu & S. H. Wang, 1985)
- Homatula anteridorsalis Li, Che & Zhou, 2019
- Homatula berezowskii (Günther, 1896)
- Homatula change Endruweit, 2015
- Homatula coccinocola Endruweit, Min & Yang, 2018
- Homatula cryptoclathrata Li, Che & Zhou, 2019
- Homatula disparizona R. Min, J. X. Yang & X. Y. Chen, 2013
- Homatula dotui Nguyen, Wu, Cao & Zhang, 2021
- Homatula erhaiensis (S. Q. Zhu & W. X. Cao, 1988)
- Homatula gelao Xiao, 2025
- Homatula geminusclathrata Li, Yang, Guo & Zhou, 2022
- Homatula guanheensis Zhou, Ma, Wang, Tang, Meng & Nie, 2021
- Homatula laxiclathra J. H. Gu & E. Zhang, 2012
- Homatula longibarbata Li, Yang, Guo & Zhou, 2022
- Homatula longidorsalis (J. X. Yang, Y. R. Chen & Kottelat, 1994)
- Homatula microcephala Li, Yang, Guo & Zhou, 2022
- Homatula nanpanjiangensis (R. Min, X. Y. Chen & J. X. Yang, 2010)
- Homatula nigra Li, Che & Zhou, 2019
- Homatula oligolepis (W. X. Cao & S. Q. Zhu, 1989)
- Homatula oxygnathus (Regan, 1908)
- Homatula potanini (Günther, 1896)
- Homatula pycnolepis Y. T. Hu & E. Zhang, 2010
- Homatula robusta Min, Zhao, Shi & Yang, 2022
- Homatula shexiang Cao, Liu, Zeng & Zhang, 2025
- Homatula submarginata Endruweit, 2025
- Homatula tigris Che, Dao, Chen, Pan, Hua, Liang & Wang, 2023
- Homatula variegata (Dabry de Thiersant, 1874)
- Homatula wenshanensis C. Li, H. Yang, W. Li & T. Liu, 2017
- Homatula wujiangensis R. H. Ding & Q. X. Deng, 1990
- Homatula wuliangensis R. Min, J. X. Yang & X. Y. Chen, 2012
- Homatula xiangzhi Cao, Liu, Zeng & Zhang, 2025
