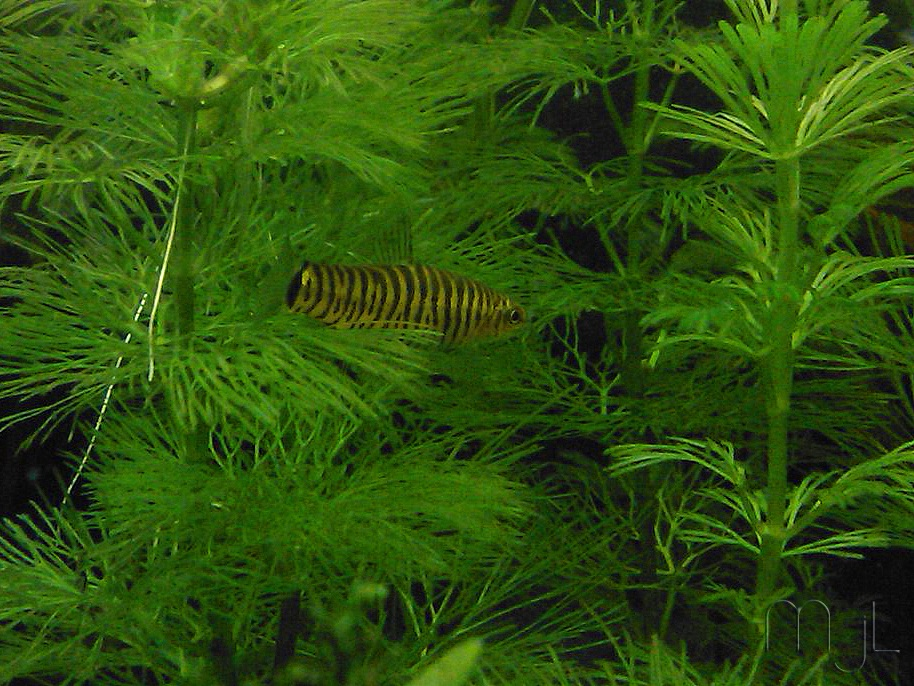
- Micronemacheilus cruciatus

Scientific classification
- Kingdom: Animalia
- Phylum: Chordata
- Class: Actinopterygii
- Division: Teleostei
- Order: Cypriniformes
- Family: Nemacheilidae
- Genus: Micronemacheilus; Rendahl, 1944

Type species
- Nemacheilus cruciatus Rendahl, 1944

= Micronemacheilus =

Genus of fishes

Micronemacheilus is a genus of freshwater ray-finned fishes belonging to the family Nemacheilidae, the stone loaches. The loaches in this genus are found in eastern Asia.

== Species ==
Micronemacheilus contains the following valid species:

- Micronemacheilus bailianensis (J. Yang, 2013)
- Micronemacheilus cruciatus (Rendahl, 1944)
- Micronemacheilus longibarbatus (X. Gan, X. Y. Chen & J. X. Yang, 2007)
- Micronemacheilus pulcherrimus (J. X. Yang, X. Y. Chen & J. H. Lan, 2004)
