= Triplophysa kullmanni =

Conservation status
- Data Deficient (IUCN 3.1)

Scientific classification
- Kingdom: Animalia
- Phylum: Chordata
- Class: Actinopterygii
- Division: Teleostei
- Order: Cypriniformes
- Family: Nemacheilidae
- Genus: Triplophysa
- Species: T. kullmanni

Binomial name
- Triplophysa kullmanni Bănărescu, Nalbant & Ladiges, 1975

Synonyms
- Nemacheilus kullmanni (Bănărescu, Nalbant & Ladiges, 1975)

Species of fish

Triplophysa kullmanni is a species of freshwater ray-finned fish belonging to the family Nemacheilidae, the stone loaches or brook loaches. This stone loach is endemic to Afghanistan.

== Taxonomy ==
Triplophysa kullmanni was first formally described in 1975 by the ichthyologists Petru Mihai Bănărescu and Teodor T. Nalbant from Romania, and Werner Ladiges, from Germany. The type locality was given as a spring at Ab-e-Nawar which was the source of a seasonal salt lake in central Afghanistan at an altitude of 3,100 m (10,200 ft). This species is classified in the genus Triplophysa, in the nominate subgenus, which is classified within the stone or brook loach family Nemacheilidae within the suborder Cobitoidei, the loaches, in the order Cypriniformes, the carp-like fishes.

== Etymology ==
Triplophysa kullmanni is a member of the geunus Triplophysa, this name means "three bladders", a reference to the shape of the bladder of its type species, T. hutjertjuensis which was described as having a “bony encapsulated diverticulum” and “two elongated bubbles” by the author of the genus Hialmar Rendahl. The specific name honours the German zoologist Ernst Kullmann the and director of the Cologne Zoological Garden from 1975 to 1981, the leader of the Afghan expedition on which the holotype was collected in 1971.

== Distribution and habitat ==
Triplophysa kullmanni is known only from Afghanistan. where it is a benthopelagic species, the type locality is a spring which is the source for an endorheic lake, the lake dries up in the summer.

== Conservation status ==
Triplophysa kullmanni is assessed as Data Deficient by the IUCN because there is no information on its population, distribution, ecology and biology.
