= Micronemacheilus pulcherrimus =

Conservation status
- Least Concern (IUCN 3.1)

Scientific classification
- Kingdom: Animalia
- Phylum: Chordata
- Class: Actinopterygii
- Order: Cypriniformes
- Family: Nemacheilidae
- Genus: Micronemacheilus
- Species: M. pulcherrimus

Binomial name
- Micronemacheilus pulcherrimus (J. X. Yang, X. Y. Chen & J. H. Lan, 2004)

Synonyms
- Yunnanilus pulcherrimus J. X. Yang, X. Y. Chen & J. H. Lan, 2004

Species of fish

Micronemacheilus pulcherrimus is a species of ray-finned fish, a stone loach, in the genus Micronemacheilus. It is found in the Hongshuihe River, part of the Xijiang River basin in China, with the type locality in Du'an County, Guangxi. The specific name pulcherrimus means most beautiful and is a reference to the "unique" banded color pattern ofthin vertical stripes crossing a wide lateral band, when compared to related species.
