= Triplophysa flavicorpus =

Scientific classification
- Kingdom: Animalia
- Phylum: Chordata
- Class: Actinopterygii
- Order: Cypriniformes
- Family: Nemacheilidae
- Genus: Triplophysa
- Species: T. flavicorpus

Binomial name
- Triplophysa flavicorpus J. X. Yang, X. Y. Chen & J. H. Lan, 2004

Species of fish

Triplophysa flavicorpus is a species of stone loach in the genus Triplophysa endemic to the Hongshui River in Guangxi, China. It grows to 10.4 cm (4.1 in) SL.
