= Triplophysa ladacensis =

Scientific classification
- Kingdom: Animalia
- Phylum: Chordata
- Class: Actinopterygii
- Division: Teleostei
- Order: Cypriniformes
- Family: Nemacheilidae
- Genus: Triplophysa
- Species: T. ladacensis

Binomial name
- Triplophysa ladacensis (Günther, 1868)

Synonyms
- Indotriplophysa tenuicauda

Species of fish

Triplophysa ladacensis is a species of ray-finned fish in the genus Triplophysa. It is endemic to deeper parts of rivers in Jammu and Kashmir in India.

Kottelat 2012 indicates that this species is most probably a synonym of Indotriplophysa tenuicauda, but it is valid in FishBase and WoRMS.
