= Triplophysa rosa =

Scientific classification
- Kingdom: Animalia
- Phylum: Chordata
- Class: Actinopterygii
- Order: Cypriniformes
- Family: Nemacheilidae
- Genus: Triplophysa
- Species: T. rosa

Binomial name
- Triplophysa rosa X. Y. Chen & J. X. Yang, 2005

Species of fish

Triplophysa rosa is a species of ray-finned fish in the genus Triplophysa. It is endemic to a single cave, Dongba Cave in Chongqing, China.
