= Triplophysa longipectoralis =

Scientific classification
- Kingdom: Animalia
- Phylum: Chordata
- Class: Actinopterygii
- Order: Cypriniformes
- Family: Nemacheilidae
- Genus: Triplophysa
- Species: T. longipectoralis

Binomial name
- Triplophysa longipectoralis L. P. Zheng, L. N. Du, X. Y. Chen & J. X. Yang, 2009

Species of fish

Triplophysa longipectoralis is a cave-living species of stone loach with vestigial eyes. The fish lives in clear water at temperatures below 20 °C. The holotype was caught in Xunle town, Huanjiang Maonan Autonomous County in the Liu River basin, Guangxi, China and was described by Zheng et al. in 2009.
