= Claea dabryi =

Conservation status
- Least Concern (IUCN 3.1)

Scientific classification
- Kingdom: Animalia
- Phylum: Chordata
- Class: Actinopterygii
- Division: Teleostei
- Order: Cypriniformes
- Family: Nemacheilidae
- Genus: Claea
- Species: C. dabryi

Binomial name
- Claea dabryi (Sauvage, 1874)

Synonyms
- Anadoras dabryi (Sauvage, 1874); Barbatula dabryi (Sauvage, 1874); Oreias crassipedunculatus Bănărescu & Nalbant, 1976; Oreias dabryi Sauvage, 1874; Oreias furcatus Bănărescu & Nalbant, 1976; Schistura dabryi (Sauvage, 1874); Schistura dabryi dabryi (Sauvage, 1874)

Genus of fishes

Claea dabryi is a species of stone loach endemic to the Jinshajiang river basin in China. Commonly known as 戴氏南鰍, which translates as Dai's southern loach.

Two former subspecies have been elevated to full species in the genus Triplophysa:

- Claea dabryi microphthalmus Liao & Wang in Liao, Wang & Luo, 1997; valid as Triplophysa microphthalma
- Claea dabryi nanpanjiangensis Zhu & Cao, 1988; valid as Triplophysa nanpanjiangensis
