= Triplophysa nujiangensa =

Scientific classification
- Kingdom: Animalia
- Phylum: Chordata
- Class: Actinopterygii
- Order: Cypriniformes
- Family: Nemacheilidae
- Genus: Triplophysa
- Species: T. nujiangensa

Binomial name
- Triplophysa nujiangensa X. Y. Chen, G. H. Cui & J. X. Yang, 2004

Species of fish

Triplophysa nujiangensa is a species of ray-finned fish in the genus Triplophysa.

== Footnotes ==
- Froese, Rainer; Pauly, Daniel (eds.). "Triplophysa nujiangensa". FishBase.
