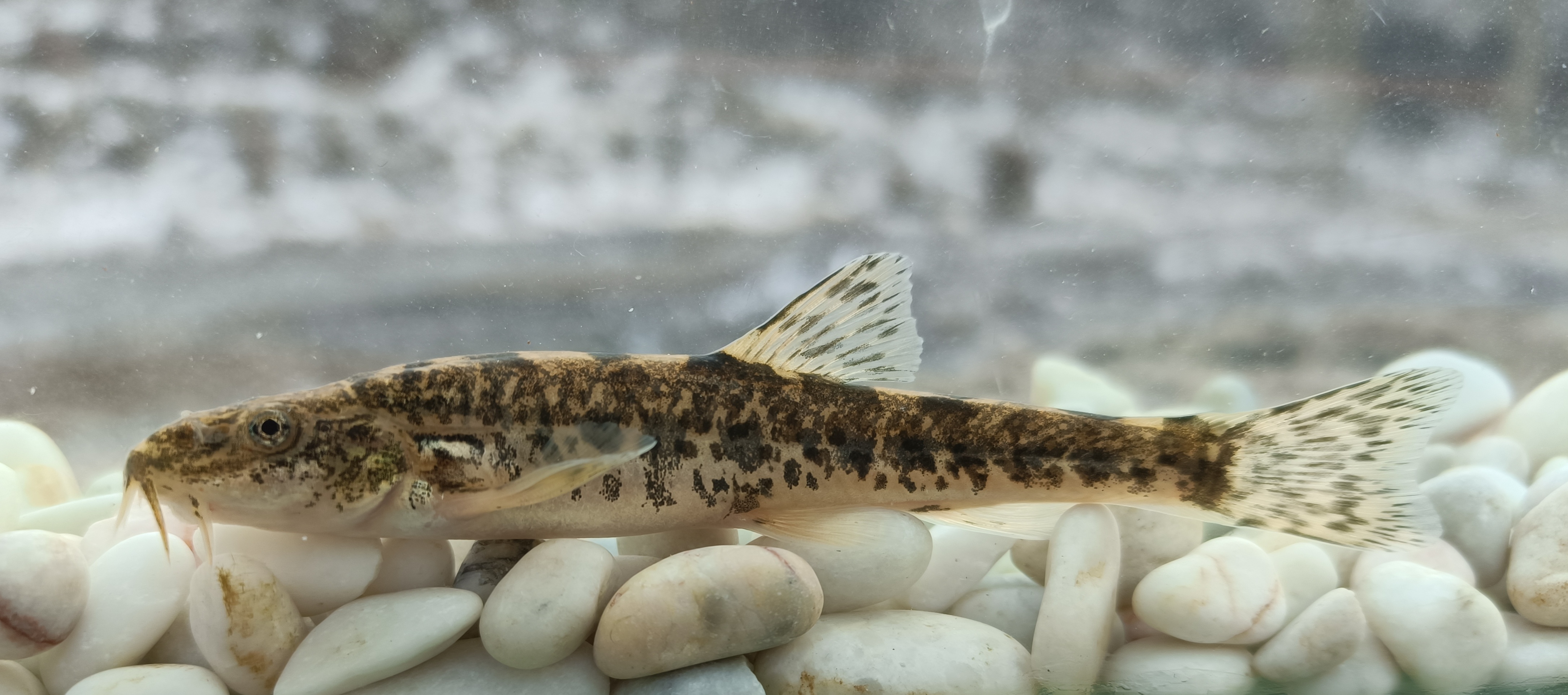

Scientific classification
- Kingdom: Animalia
- Phylum: Chordata
- Class: Actinopterygii
- Division: Teleostei
- Order: Cypriniformes
- Family: Nemacheilidae
- Genus: Triplophysa
- Species: T. ferganaensis

Binomial name
- Triplophysa ferganaensis Sheraliev & Peng, 2021

= Triplophysa ferganaensis =

Species of fish

Triplophysa ferganaensis, the Fergana stone loach, is a species of freshwater ray-finned fish belonging to the family Nemacheilidae, the stone loaches or brook loaches. This stone loach is found in Central Asia.

== Taxonomy ==
Triplophysa ferganaensis was first formally described in 2021 by Bakhtiyor Sheraliev and Zuogang Peng with its type locality given as the Shakhimardan stream in Yordon village, an exclave of Uzbekistan in Kyrgyzstan, Syr Darya basin, Fergana district, Fergana Region, Uzbekistan at 39°57.842′N 71°45.6467′E, from an elevation of 1,581 m (5,187 ft). This species is classified in the genus Triplophysa, in the subgenus, Indotriplophysa, which is classified within the stone or brook loach family Nemacheilidae within the suborder Cobitoidei, the loaches, in the order Cypriniformes, the carp-like fishes.

== Etymology ==
Triplophysa ferganaensis is a member of the geunus Triplophysa, this name means "three bladders", a reference to the shape of the bladder of its type species, T. hutjertjuensis which was described as having a “bony encapsulated diverticulum” and “two elongated bubbles” by the author of the genus Hialmar Rendahl. The specific name ferganaensis is taken from the Fergana Valley, Uzbekistan, where the type locality is located.

== Description ==
Triplophysa ferganaensis grows to a standard length of 109 mm (4.3 in). Eyes are present. Mouth is inferior. Gill rakers are absent in outer row, however, 10–11 gill rakers are found in inner row on first-gill arch. Scales are absent on the body. The lateral line is complete. Elongated body is slightly compressed anteriorly and strongly compressed posteriorly. Lips thick with furrows and papillae. Three pairs of barbels are present. Dorsal and anal fins are truncate. Pectoral fins are moderately developed. Caudal fin emarginated and tips are pointed.

== Distribution and habitat ==
Triplophysa ferganaensis is endemic to Central Asia where its is found in the Shakhimardan River drainage in the Syr Darya basin of Tajikistan, Uzbekistan and Kyrgyzstan. This stream is a turbid and cold high altitude stream.
