= Micronemacheilus longibarbatus =

Conservation status
- Least Concern (IUCN 3.1)

Scientific classification
- Kingdom: Animalia
- Phylum: Chordata
- Class: Actinopterygii
- Order: Cypriniformes
- Family: Nemacheilidae
- Genus: Micronemacheilus
- Species: M. longibarbatus

Binomial name
- Micronemacheilus longibarbatus (X. Gan, X. Y. Chen & J. X. Yang, 2007)

Synonyms
- Yunnanilus longibarbatus Gan, Chen & Yang, 2007

Species of fish

Micronemacheilus longibarbatus is a species of stone loach. It is endemic to the Hongshui River basin in Guangxi, southern China. It grows to 5.8 cm (2.3 in) SL.
