= T. robusta =

T. robusta may refer to:

- Tasiocera robusta, a crane fly species in the genus Tasiocera
- Terebra robusta, a sea snail species
- Triplophysa robusta, a ray-finned fish species
- Tyto robusta, a prehistoric barn-owl species that lived in what is now Monte Gargano in Italy

== See also ==
- Robusta
