= Triplophysa arnoldii =

Scientific classification
- Kingdom: Animalia
- Phylum: Chordata
- Class: Actinopterygii
- Division: Teleostei
- Order: Cypriniformes
- Family: Nemacheilidae
- Genus: Triplophysa
- Species: T. arnoldii

Binomial name
- Triplophysa arnoldii Prokofiev, 2006

Species of fish

Triplophysa arnoldii is a species of freshwater ray-finned fish belonging to the family Nemacheilidae, the stone loaches or brook loaches. This stone loach is endemic to Mongolia.

== Taxonomy ==
Triplophysa arnoldii was first formally described in 2006 by the Russian ichthyologist Artem Mikhailovich Prokofiev with its type locality was given as the stream connecting lakes Ayrag-Nuur and Khirgis-Nuur in the Khovd River system in western Mongolia. This species is classified in the genus Triplophysa, in the subgenus Paradidymophysa, which is classified within the stone or brook loach family Nemacheilidae within the suborder Cobitoidei, the loaches, in the order Cypriniformes, the carp-like fishes.

== Etymology ==
Triplophysa arnoldii is a member of the geunus Triplophysa, this name means "three bladders", a reference to the shape of the bladder of its type species, T. hutjertjuensis which was described as having a “bony encapsulated diverticulum” and “two elongated bubbles” by the author of the genus Hialmar Rendahl. The specific name honours the Russian entomologist Lev Vladimirovich Arnoldi, who collected the type specimen.

== Description ==
Triplophysa arnoldii has 3 spines and 7 soft rays in the dorsal fin and 2 or 3 spines and 5 or 6 soft rays in the anal fin. The skin has a dense covering of wart-like tubercles in both sexes and all ages. The shape of the body is elongated and this species a standard length and 7 cm (2.8 in).

== Distribution and habitat ==
Triplophysa arnoldii is endemic to Mongolia where it is found in the lower Khovd River system in western Mongolia.
