= Triplophysa venusta =

Scientific classification
- Kingdom: Animalia
- Phylum: Chordata
- Class: Actinopterygii
- Order: Cypriniformes
- Family: Nemacheilidae
- Genus: Triplophysa
- Species: T. venusta

Binomial name
- Triplophysa venusta S. Q. Zhu & W. X. Cao, 1988

Species of fish

Triplophysa venusta is a species of ray-finned fish in the genus Triplophysa.

== Footnotes ==
- Froese, Rainer; Pauly, Daniel (eds.). "Triplophysa venusta". FishBase.
