= Triplophysa fuxianensis =

Scientific classification
- Kingdom: Animalia
- Phylum: Chordata
- Class: Actinopterygii
- Order: Cypriniformes
- Family: Nemacheilidae
- Genus: Triplophysa
- Species: T. fuxianensis

Binomial name
- Triplophysa fuxianensis J. X. Yang & X. L. Chu, 1990

Species of fish

Triplophysa fuxianensis is a species of stone loach in the genus Triplophysa endemic to Fuxian Lake in Yunnan, China. It grows to 8.4 cm (3.3 in) SL.
