= Triplophysa (Tarimichthys) =

Scientific classification
- Kingdom: Animalia
- Phylum: Chordata
- Class: Actinopterygii
- Order: Cypriniformes
- Family: Nemacheilidae
- Genus: Triplophysa
- Subgenus: Tarimichthys; Prokofiev, 2010

Type species
- Nemacheilus bombifrons Herzenstein, 1888

Subgenus of fishes

Tarimichthys is a subgenus of stone loach genus Triplophysa native to China which contains two species. Some authorities recognise Tarimichthys as a valid taxon.

== Species ==
There are currently two recognized species in this genus:

- Triplophysa (Tarimichthys) bombifrons (Herzenstein, 1888)
- Triplophysa (Tarimichthys) edsinica (Prokofiev, 2003)

Maurice Kottelat recognises a third species Triplophysa (Tarimichthys) incipiens which other authorities consider a subspecies of T. (T.) bombifrons.
