= Triplophysa herzensteini =

Conservation status
- Least Concern (IUCN 3.1)

Scientific classification
- Kingdom: Animalia
- Phylum: Chordata
- Class: Actinopterygii
- Order: Cypriniformes
- Family: Nemacheilidae
- Genus: Triplophysa
- Subgenus: Labiatophysa
- Species: T. herzensteini

Binomial name
- Triplophysa herzensteini (L. S. Berg, 1909)

Synonyms
- Diplophysa labiata herzensteini L. S. Berg, 1909; Labiatophysa herzensteini (L. S. Berg, 1909)

Species of fish

Triplophysa herzensteini is a species of ray-finned fish in the genus Triplophysa , it is placed in the subgenus Labiatophysa which is regarded by some authorities a valid genus.
