= Triplophysa (Indotriplophysa) =

Scientific classification
- Kingdom: Animalia
- Phylum: Chordata
- Class: Actinopterygii
- Order: Cypriniformes
- Family: Nemacheilidae
- Genus: Triplophysa
- Subgenus: Indotriplophysa; Prokofiev, 2010

Subgenus of fishes

Indotriplophysa is a subgenus of the stone loach genus Triplophysa native to central Asia. It is regarded by some authorities as a valid genus in its own right.

== Species ==
There are currently six recognized species in this subgenus:

- Triplophysa (Indotriplophysa) choprai (Hora), 1934
- Triplophysa (Indotriplophysa) crassicauda (Herzenstein, 1888)
- Triplophysa (Indotriplophysa) eugeniae (Prokofiev, 2002)
- Triplophysa (Indotriplophysa) leptosoma (Herzenstein, 1888)
- Triplophysa (Indotriplophysa) tenuis (F. Day, 1877)
- Triplophysa (Indotriplophysa) yasinensis (Alcock, 1898)

Synonyms

Kottelat 2012 indicates that T. (I.) ladacensis is most probably a synonym of Triplophysa tenuicauda
