= Triplophysa aluensis =

Scientific classification
- Kingdom: Animalia
- Phylum: Chordata
- Class: Actinopterygii
- Order: Cypriniformes
- Family: Nemacheilidae
- Genus: Triplophysa
- Species: T. aluensis

Binomial name
- Triplophysa aluensis W. X. Li & Z. G. Zhu, 2000

Species of fish

Triplophysa aluensis is a species of stone loach in the genus Triplophysa. It is endemic to China. It grows to 8.1 cm (3.2 in) SL. They can be found at Alu Ancient Cave, Luxi County, Yunnan Province.
