= Triplophysa aliensis =

Scientific classification
- Kingdom: Animalia
- Phylum: Chordata
- Class: Actinopterygii
- Order: Cypriniformes
- Family: Nemacheilidae
- Genus: Triplophysa
- Species: T. aliensis

Binomial name
- Triplophysa aliensis (Y. F. Wu & S. Q. Zhu, 1979)

Synonyms
- Nemacheilus aliensis Wu & Zhu, 1979

Species of fish

Triplophysa aliensis is a species of stone loach in the genus Triplophysa endemic to Tibet. It grows to 10.4 cm (4.1 in) SL. Its name refers to Ali, Tibet, its type locality.
