= Triplophysa rotundiventris =

Scientific classification
- Kingdom: Animalia
- Phylum: Chordata
- Class: Actinopterygii
- Order: Cypriniformes
- Family: Nemacheilidae
- Genus: Triplophysa
- Subgenus: Qinghaichthys
- Species: T. rotundiventris

Binomial name
- Triplophysa rotundiventris (Y. F. Wu & Yuan Chen, 1979)

Synonyms
- Nemacheilus rotundiventris Y. F. Wu & Yuan Chen, 1979; Qinghaichthys rotundiventris (Y. F. Wu & Yuan Chen, 1979)

Species of fish

Triplophysa rotundiventris is a species of ray-finned fish belonging to the subgenus Qinghaichthys, although these stone loaches are placed in the genus Qinghaichthys by some authorities. It was described from a specimen taken in the Jiegu He, a tributary of upper Yangtze in the Yushu Tibetan Autonomous Prefecture, China.
