= Triplophysa chandagaitensis =

Scientific classification
- Kingdom: Animalia
- Phylum: Chordata
- Class: Actinopterygii
- Order: Cypriniformes
- Family: Nemacheilidae
- Genus: Triplophysa
- Species: T. chandagaitensis

Binomial name
- Triplophysa chandagaitensis Prokofiev, 2002

Species of fish

Triplophysa chandagaitensis is a species of freshwater ray-finned fish belonging to the family Nemacheilidae, the stone loaches. This taxo was previously considered to be a subspecies of Triplophysa gundriseri. This species is found in the Chandagaity River in the Tuva Republic of Russia.
