= Schizopygopsis firmispinatus =

Conservation status
- Least Concern (IUCN 3.1)

Scientific classification
- Kingdom: Animalia
- Phylum: Chordata
- Class: Actinopterygii
- Order: Cypriniformes
- Family: Cyprinidae
- Genus: Schizopygopsis
- Species: S. firmispinatus

Binomial name
- Schizopygopsis firmispinatus (Y. F. Wu & C. Z. Wu, 1988)

Species of fish

Schizopygopsis firmispinatus is a species of fish in the Cyprinidae family. The species is found in both the Jinsha River and the Lancang River in China.
