= Labiatophysa microphthalma =

Scientific classification
- Kingdom: Animalia
- Phylum: Chordata
- Class: Actinopterygii
- Division: Teleostei
- Order: Cypriniformes
- Family: Nemacheilidae
- Genus: Triplophysa
- Subgenus: Labiatophysa
- Species: T. microphthalma

Binomial name
- Triplophysa microphthalma (Kessler, 1879)

Synonyms
- Diplophysa microphthalma Kessler, 1879; Triplophysa microphthalma (Kessler, 1879)

Species of fish

Labiatophysa microphthalma is a species of ray-finned fish in the genus Triplophysa, it is placed in the subgenus Labiatophysa which is regarded by some authorities as a valid genus. It is endemic to desert oases in the Chami Depression of Xinijang Uighur Autonomous Region, China.
