= Triplophysa xichangensis =

Conservation status
- Least Concern (IUCN 3.1)

Scientific classification
- Kingdom: Animalia
- Phylum: Chordata
- Class: Actinopterygii
- Order: Cypriniformes
- Family: Nemacheilidae
- Genus: Triplophysa
- Species: T. xichangensis

Binomial name
- Triplophysa xichangensis S. Q. Zhu & W. X. Cao, 1989

Species of fish

Triplophysa xichangensis is a species of ray-finned fish in the genus Triplophysa. It is found in Sichuan and Yunnan provinces in China.
