= Triplophysa longianguis =

Scientific classification
- Kingdom: Animalia
- Phylum: Chordata
- Class: Actinopterygii
- Order: Cypriniformes
- Family: Nemacheilidae
- Genus: Triplophysa
- Species: T. longianguis

Binomial name
- Triplophysa longianguis Y. F. Wu & C. Z. Wu, 1984

Species of fish

Triplophysa longianguis is a species of cyprinid fish in the family Nemacheilidae. It is endemic to the Yellow River in Qinghai, China. It can grow to 18.5 cm (7.3 in) standard length.
