= Triplophysa zamegacephala =

Scientific classification
- Kingdom: Animalia
- Phylum: Chordata
- Class: Actinopterygii
- Order: Cypriniformes
- Family: Nemacheilidae
- Genus: Triplophysa
- Subgenus: Qinghaichthys
- Species: T. zamegacephala

Binomial name
- Triplophysa zamegacephala (T. Q. Zhao, 1985)

Synonyms
- Nemachilus zamegacephalus T. Q. Zhao, 1985; Qinghaichthys zamegacephalus (T. Q. Zhao, 1985)

Species of fish

Triplophysa zamegacephala is a species of ray-finned fish in the genus Triplophysaalthough these stone loaches are placed in the genus Qinghaichthys by some authorities. It occurs in the Gaize River in Xinjiang Autonomous Region, China.
