= Triplophysa moquensis =

Conservation status
- Least Concern (IUCN 3.1)

Scientific classification
- Kingdom: Animalia
- Phylum: Chordata
- Class: Actinopterygii
- Order: Cypriniformes
- Family: Nemacheilidae
- Genus: Triplophysa
- Species: T. moquensis

Binomial name
- Triplophysa moquensis R. H. Ding, 1994

Species of fish

Triplophysa moquensis is a species of ray-finned fish in the genus Triplophysa. It is endemic to Xiaman Lake, Sichuan, although it might occur more widely.
