= Triplophysa labiata =

Conservation status
- Vulnerable (IUCN 3.1)

Scientific classification
- Kingdom: Animalia
- Phylum: Chordata
- Class: Actinopterygii
- Order: Cypriniformes
- Family: Nemacheilidae
- Genus: Triplophysa
- Subgenus: Labiatophysa
- Species: T. labiata

Binomial name
- Triplophysa labiata (Kessler, 1874)

Synonyms
- Diplophysa labiata Kessler, 1874; Labiatophysa labiata Kessler, 1874; Nemachilus labiatus conjungens Herzenstein, 1888

Species of fish

Triplophysa labiata, the plain thicklip loach, is a species of ray-finned fish in the genus Triplophysa.
