= Triplophysa obtusirostra =

Conservation status
- Least Concern (IUCN 3.1)

Scientific classification
- Kingdom: Animalia
- Phylum: Chordata
- Class: Actinopterygii
- Order: Cypriniformes
- Family: Nemacheilidae
- Genus: Triplophysa
- Species: T. obtusirostra

Binomial name
- Triplophysa obtusirostra Y. F. Wu & C. Z. Wu, 1988

Species of fish

Triplophysa obtusirostra is a species of ray-finned fish in the genus Triplophysa. It is endemic to Qinghai province, China, near the origin of the Yellow River.
