= Triplophysa nandanensis =

Scientific classification
- Kingdom: Animalia
- Phylum: Chordata
- Class: Actinopterygii
- Order: Cypriniformes
- Family: Nemacheilidae
- Genus: Triplophysa
- Species: T. nandanensis

Binomial name
- Triplophysa nandanensis J. H. Lan, J. X. Yang & Y. R. Chen, 1995

Species of fish

Triplophysa nandanensis is a species of ray-finned fish in the genus Triplophysa.

== Footnotes ==
- Froese, Rainer; Pauly, Daniel (eds.). "Triplophysa nandanensis". FishBase.
