= Triplophysa yunnanensis =

Scientific classification
- Kingdom: Animalia
- Phylum: Chordata
- Class: Actinopterygii
- Order: Cypriniformes
- Family: Nemacheilidae
- Genus: Triplophysa
- Species: T. yunnanensis

Binomial name
- Triplophysa yunnanensis J. X. Yang, 1990

Species of fish

Triplophysa yunnanensis is a species of ray-finned fish in the genus Triplophysa. It is a cave-dwelling species endemic to Yiliang County, Yunnan, China. It grows to 6.3 cm (2.5 in) SL.
