= Lacertaspis =

Scientific classification
- Kingdom: Animalia
- Phylum: Chordata
- Class: Reptilia
- Order: Squamata
- Family: Scincidae
- Subfamily: Eugongylinae
- Genus: Lacertaspis; Perret, 1975

Genus of lizards

Lidless Skink

Lacertaspis is a genus of skinks endemic to Central Africa.

== Species ==
The following five species are recognized.

- Lacertaspis chriswildi (Böhme & Schmitz, 1996) – Chris Wild's snake-eyed skink
- Lacertaspis gemmiventris (Sjöstedt, 1897) – Sjostedt's five-toed skink
- Lacertaspis lepesmei (Angel, 1940) – Angel's five-toed skink
- Lacertaspis reichenowii (W. Peters, 1874)
- Lacertaspis rohdei (L. Müller, 1910) – Gaboon lidless skink

Nota bene: A binomial authority in parentheses indicates that the species was originally described in a genus other than Lacertaspis.
