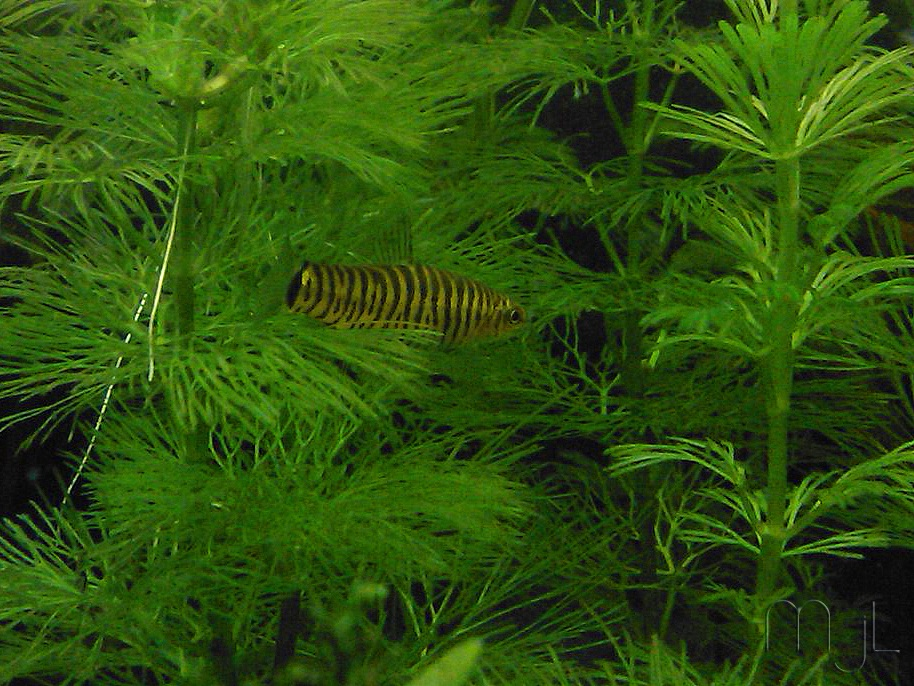

Conservation status
- Least Concern (IUCN 3.1)

Scientific classification
- Kingdom: Animalia
- Phylum: Chordata
- Class: Actinopterygii
- Division: Teleostei
- Order: Cypriniformes
- Family: Nemacheilidae
- Genus: Micronemacheilus
- Species: M. cruciatus

Binomial name
- Micronemacheilus cruciatus (Rendahl, 1944)

Synonyms
- Nemacheilus cruciatus Rendahl, 1944; Yunnanilus cruciatus (Rendahl 1944)

= Micronemacheilus cruciatus =

Species of fish

Micronemacheilus cruciatus, the Vietnamese multi banded zebra loach, is a species of freshwater ray-finned fish belonging to the family Nemacheilidae, the stone loaches. This species is endemic to Vietnam where it occurs from the from the An Lao River in Binh Dinh Province to the Phong Nha River in Quang Binh Province. This species grows to a standard length of 3.4 cm (1.3 in).. M. cruciatus occurs in the relatively still and shallow stretches of rivers where there is dense aquatic vegetation and the substrate is muddy and sandy. The species seems to be quite commonly found in the aquarium trade.
