= Triplophysa turpanensis =

Conservation status
- Least Concern (IUCN 3.1)

Scientific classification
- Kingdom: Animalia
- Phylum: Chordata
- Class: Actinopterygii
- Order: Cypriniformes
- Family: Nemacheilidae
- Genus: Triplophysa
- Species: T. turpanensis

Binomial name
- Triplophysa turpanensis Y. F. Wu & C. Z. Wu, 1992

Species of fish

Triplophysa turpanensis is a species of stone loach in the genus Triplophysa. It is endemic to Xinjiang in extreme western China. It grows to 7.7 cm (3.0 in) SL.
