= Triplophysa hsutschouensis =

Scientific classification
- Kingdom: Animalia
- Phylum: Chordata
- Class: Actinopterygii
- Order: Cypriniformes
- Family: Nemacheilidae
- Genus: Triplophysa
- Species: T. hsutschouensis

Binomial name
- Triplophysa hsutschouensis (Rendahl (de), 1933)

Synonyms
- Nemacheilus hsutschouensis Rendahl, 1933

Species of fish

Triplophysa hsutschouensis is a species of stone loach endemic to the Ruo Shui river system in Gansu, China.
