= Triplophysa gerzeensis =

Scientific classification
- Kingdom: Animalia
- Phylum: Chordata
- Class: Actinopterygii
- Order: Cypriniformes
- Family: Nemacheilidae
- Genus: Triplophysa
- Species: T. gerzeensis

Binomial name
- Triplophysa gerzeensis W. X. Cao & S. Q. Zhu, 1988

Species of fish

Triplophysa gerzeensis is a species of stone loach in the genus Triplophysa. It is endemic to Tibet.
