= Triplophysa cakaensis =

Scientific classification
- Kingdom: Animalia
- Phylum: Chordata
- Class: Actinopterygii
- Order: Cypriniformes
- Family: Nemacheilidae
- Genus: Triplophysa
- Species: T. cakaensis

Binomial name
- Triplophysa cakaensis W. X. Cao & S. Q. Zhu, 1988

Species of fish

Triplophysa cakaensis is a small species of stone loach in the genus Triplophysa. It is endemic to Ulan, Qinghai Province, China. It grows to 6.8 cm (2.7 in) SL.
