= Sinocyclocheilus huizeensis =

Scientific classification
- Kingdom: Animalia
- Phylum: Chordata
- Class: Actinopterygii
- Order: Cypriniformes
- Family: Cyprinidae
- Subfamily: Cyprininae
- Genus: Sinocyclocheilus
- Species: S. huizeensis

Binomial name
- Sinocyclocheilus huizeensis C. Cheng, X. F. Pan, X. Y. Chen, J. Y. Li, L. Ma & J. X. Yang, 2015

Species of fish

Sinocyclocheilus huizeensis is a species of freshwater ray-finned fish from the family Cyprinidae which is only known from Dalong Spring in the Jinshajiang Drainage, in Huize County, Yunnan, China.
