= Triplophysa shilinensis =

Scientific classification
- Kingdom: Animalia
- Phylum: Chordata
- Class: Actinopterygii
- Order: Cypriniformes
- Family: Nemacheilidae
- Genus: Triplophysa
- Species: T. shilinensis

Binomial name
- Triplophysa shilinensis Y. R. Chen & J. X. Yang, 1992

Species of fish

Triplophysa shilinensis is a species of ray-finned fish in the genus Triplophysa. They can be found at Boyi Village near Shilin in Lunan County, Yunnan Province.

== Footnotes ==
- Froese, Rainer; Pauly, Daniel (eds.). "Triplophysa shilinensis". FishBase.
