= Triplophysa ninglangensis =

Scientific classification
- Kingdom: Animalia
- Phylum: Chordata
- Class: Actinopterygii
- Order: Cypriniformes
- Family: Nemacheilidae
- Genus: Triplophysa
- Species: T. ninglangensis

Binomial name
- Triplophysa ninglangensis Y. F. Wu & C. Z. Wu, 1988

Species of fish

Triplophysa ninglangensis is a species of ray-finned fish in the genus Triplophysa.

== Footnotes ==
- Froese, Rainer; Pauly, Daniel (eds.). "Triplophysa ninglangensis". FishBase.
