= Triplophysa kaznakowi =

Scientific classification
- Kingdom: Animalia
- Phylum: Chordata
- Class: Actinopterygii
- Order: Cypriniformes
- Family: Nemacheilidae
- Genus: Triplophysa
- Subgenus: Labiatophysa
- Species: T. kaznakowi

Binomial name
- Triplophysa kaznakowi Prokofiev, 2004

Synonyms
- Labiatophysa kaznakowi Prokofiev, 2004

Species of fish

Triplophysa kaznakowi is a species of ray-finned fish in the genus Triplophysa.
