= Triplophysa parva =

Scientific classification
- Kingdom: Animalia
- Phylum: Chordata
- Class: Actinopterygii
- Order: Cypriniformes
- Family: Nemacheilidae
- Genus: Triplophysa
- Species: T. parvus

Binomial name
- Triplophysa parvus Z. M. Chen, W. X. Li & J. X. Yang, 2009

Species of fish

Triplophysa parvus is a species of ray-finned fish in the genus Triplophysa.
