= Triplophysa lacustris =

Scientific classification
- Kingdom: Animalia
- Phylum: Chordata
- Class: Actinopterygii
- Order: Cypriniformes
- Family: Nemacheilidae
- Genus: Triplophysa
- Species: T. lacustris

Binomial name
- Triplophysa lacustris J. X. Yang & X. L. Chu, 1990

Species of fish

Triplophysa lacustris is a species of stone loach endemic to China. It is only found in Lake Xinyun in Yunnan. It grows to 5.6 cm (2.2 in) standard length.
