= Triplophysa anterodorsalis =

Scientific classification
- Kingdom: Animalia
- Phylum: Chordata
- Class: Actinopterygii
- Order: Cypriniformes
- Family: Nemacheilidae
- Genus: Triplophysa
- Species: T. anterodorsalis

Binomial name
- Triplophysa anterodorsalis S. Q. Zhu & W. X. Cao, 1989

Species of fish

Triplophysa anterodorsalis is a species of stone loach in the genus Triplophysa. It is endemic to China.
