= Triplophysa pseudoscleroptera =

Scientific classification
- Kingdom: Animalia
- Phylum: Chordata
- Class: Actinopterygii
- Order: Cypriniformes
- Family: Nemacheilidae
- Genus: Triplophysa
- Species: T. pseudoscleroptera

Binomial name
- Triplophysa pseudoscleroptera (S. Q. Zhu & Y. F. Wu, 1981)

Species of fish

Triplophysa pseudoscleroptera is a species of ray-finned fish in the genus Triplophysa.

== Footnotes ==
- Froese, Rainer; Pauly, Daniel (eds.). "Triplophysa pseudoscleroptera". FishBase.
