= Triplophysa laterimaculata =

Scientific classification
- Kingdom: Animalia
- Phylum: Chordata
- Class: Actinopterygii
- Order: Cypriniformes
- Family: Nemacheilidae
- Genus: Triplophysa
- Species: T. laterimaculata

Binomial name
- Triplophysa laterimaculata J. L. Li, N. F. Liu & J. X. Yang, 2007

Species of fish

Triplophysa laterimaculata is a species of stone loach endemic to the Tarim Basin, Xinjiang.
