= Triplophysa cuneicephala =

Scientific classification
- Kingdom: Animalia
- Phylum: Chordata
- Class: Actinopterygii
- Order: Cypriniformes
- Family: Nemacheilidae
- Genus: Triplophysa
- Species: T. cuneicephala

Binomial name
- Triplophysa cuneicephala (T. H. Shaw & T. L. Tchang, 1931)

Synonyms
- Barbatula cuneicephalus Shaw & Tchang, 1931

Species of fish

Triplophysa cuneicephala is a species of stone loach in the genus Triplophysa. It is endemic to China and was first discovered from near Beijing.
