= Triplophysa altipinnis =

Scientific classification
- Kingdom: Animalia
- Phylum: Chordata
- Class: Actinopterygii
- Order: Cypriniformes
- Family: Nemacheilidae
- Genus: Triplophysa
- Species: T. altipinnis

Binomial name
- Triplophysa altipinnis Prokofiev, 2003

Species of fish

Triplophysa altipinnis is a species of stone loach in the genus Triplophysa. It is endemic to China.
