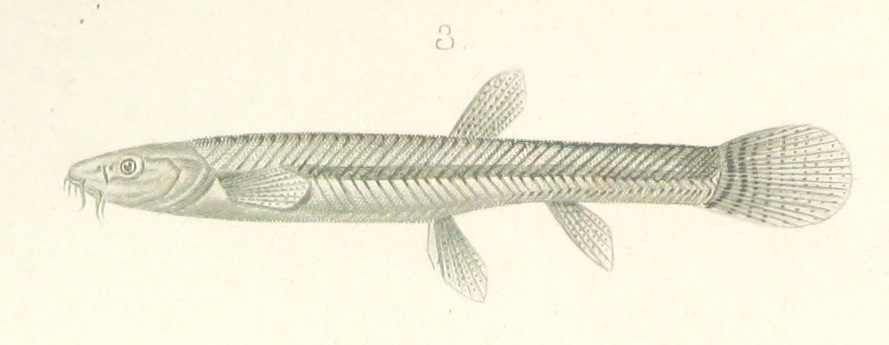

Conservation status
- Least Concern (IUCN 3.1)

Scientific classification
- Kingdom: Animalia
- Phylum: Chordata
- Class: Actinopterygii
- Order: Cypriniformes
- Family: Nemacheilidae
- Genus: Triplophysa
- Species: T. intermedia

Binomial name
- Triplophysa intermedia (Kessler, 1876)

Synonyms
- Diplophysa intermedia Kessler, 1876

= Triplophysa intermedia =

Species of fish

Triplophysa intermedia is a species of stone loach in the genus Triplophysa. The species has only been found in Hulun Lake in Inner Mongolia, China; but is believed to appear in other locations as well since fish in this genus are typically found in running water.
