= Triplophysa zhaoi =

Scientific classification
- Kingdom: Animalia
- Phylum: Chordata
- Class: Actinopterygii
- Order: Cypriniformes
- Family: Nemacheilidae
- Genus: Triplophysa
- Species: T. zhaoi

Binomial name
- Triplophysa zhaoi Prokofiev, 2006

Species of fish

Triplophysa zhaoi is a species of ray-finned fish in the genus Triplophysa. It grows to 8 cm (3.1 in) SL. It is endemic to China and inhabits swampy creeks.

Triplophysa zhaoi holds the record for the lowest altitude for Asian fish: it is found at 50 m (160 ft) below sea level in swamps of the Lükqün oasis, in the Turpan Depression, Xinjiang.
