= Triplophysa daochengensis =

Scientific classification
- Kingdom: Animalia
- Phylum: Chordata
- Class: Actinopterygii
- Order: Cypriniformes
- Family: Nemacheilidae
- Genus: Triplophysa
- Species: T. daochengensis

Binomial name
- Triplophysa daochengensis Y. Y. Wu, Z. Y. Sun & Y. S. Guo, 2016

Species of fish

Triplophysa daochengensis is a species of stone loach in the genus Triplophysa. It is endemic to the Daocheng River in Sichuan Province, China.

== Description ==
Triplophysa daochengensis reaches a standard length of 9.8 cm (3.9 in).
