= Triplophysa stewarti =

Conservation status
- Least Concern (IUCN 3.1)

Scientific classification
- Kingdom: Animalia
- Phylum: Chordata
- Class: Actinopterygii
- Order: Cypriniformes
- Family: Nemacheilidae
- Genus: Triplophysa
- Species: T. stewarti

Binomial name
- Triplophysa stewarti (Hora, 1922)

Species of fish

Triplophysa stewarti is a species of stone loach in the genus Triplophysa. It lives in slow-flowing rivers and lakes among rocks and vegetation; it is found in numerous lakes and in upper Salween, Indus, and Brahmaputra drainages in Tibet as well as in Kashmir, India. It grows to 20.8 cm (8.2 in) SL.

== Genomics ==
A chromosome-level genome assembly of Triplophysa stewarti was published in 2026. The assembled genome spans approximately 697.9 Mb, with 25 chromosomes representing 92.65% of the assembly. The assembly has a BUSCO completeness score of 98.4%, and 28,009 protein-coding genes were predicted.
