= Triplophysa nanpanjiangensis =

Scientific classification
- Kingdom: Animalia
- Phylum: Chordata
- Class: Actinopterygii
- Order: Cypriniformes
- Family: Nemacheilidae
- Genus: Triplophysa
- Species: T. nanpanjiangensis

Binomial name
- Triplophysa nanpanjiangensis (S. Q. Zhu & W. X. Cao, 1988)

Species of fish

Triplophysa nanpanjiangensis is a species of ray-finned fish in the genus Triplophysa.

== Footnotes ==
- Froese, Rainer; Pauly, Daniel (eds.). "Triplophysa nanpanjiangensis". FishBase.
