= Yunnanilus qujinensis =

Scientific classification
- Kingdom: Animalia
- Phylum: Chordata
- Class: Actinopterygii
- Order: Cypriniformes
- Family: Nemacheilidae
- Genus: Yunnanilus
- Species: Y. qujinensis

Binomial name
- Yunnanilus qujinensis L. N. Du, Y. F. Lu & X. Y. Chen, 2015

Species of fish

Yunnanilus qujinensis is a species of freshwater ray-finned fish, a stone loach which is endemic to China. The species was described from specimens collected at a spring into the Hujiafen Reservoir in the Nanpanjiang River drainage near Qujing in Yunnan, its Specific name (zoology) refers to the city of Qujin. It has not yet been included in FishBase.
