= Triplophysa microps =

Conservation status
- Least Concern (IUCN 3.1)

Scientific classification
- Kingdom: Animalia
- Phylum: Chordata
- Class: Actinopterygii
- Order: Cypriniformes
- Family: Nemacheilidae
- Genus: Triplophysa
- Species: T. microps

Binomial name
- Triplophysa microps (Steindachner, 1866)

Species of fish

Triplophysa microps is a species of ray-finned fish in the genus Triplophysa. It is found in shallow streams in the upper reaches of the Yellow, Yangtze, Salween, Mekong, Indus and Brahmaputra rivers and also in alpine lakes in the Tibetan plateau.
