= Triplophysa (Labiatophysa) =

Scientific classification
- Kingdom: Animalia
- Phylum: Chordata
- Class: Actinopterygii
- Division: Teleostei
- Order: Cypriniformes
- Family: Nemacheilidae
- Genus: Triplophysa
- Subgenus: Labiatophysa; Prokofiev, 2010

Subgenus of fishes

Labiatophysa is a subgenus of stone loach genus Triplophysa native to central Asia. It is regarded by some authorities as a valid genus in its own right.

== Species ==
There are currently four valid species in this genus:

- Labiatophysa herzensteini (L. S. Berg, 1909)
- Labiatophysa kaznakowi (Prokofiev, 2004)
- Labiatophysa labiata (Kessler, 1874)
- Labiatophysa microphthalma (Kessler, 1879)
- Labiatophysa nasalis (Kessler, 1876) (incertae sedis but probably belongs in this subgenus)
