= Triplophysa brevibarba =

Scientific classification
- Kingdom: Animalia
- Phylum: Chordata
- Class: Actinopterygii
- Order: Cypriniformes
- Family: Nemacheilidae
- Genus: Triplophysa
- Species: T. brevibarba

Binomial name
- Triplophysa brevibarba R. H. Ding, 1993

Species of fish

Triplophysa brevibarba is a species of stone loach in the genus Triplophysa. It is endemic to Sichuan, China.
