= Triplophysa pappenheimi =

Scientific classification
- Kingdom: Animalia
- Phylum: Chordata
- Class: Actinopterygii
- Order: Cypriniformes
- Family: Nemacheilidae
- Genus: Triplophysa
- Species: T. pappenheimi

Binomial name
- Triplophysa pappenheimi (P. W. Fang, 1935)

Species of fish

Triplophysa pappenheimi is a species of stone loach. It is endemic to China and found in the upper reaches of the Yellow River in Qinghai province. It grows to 18 cm (7.1 in) TL.
