= Triplophysa sewerzowi =

Conservation status
- Vulnerable (IUCN 3.1)

Scientific classification
- Kingdom: Animalia
- Phylum: Chordata
- Class: Actinopterygii
- Order: Cypriniformes
- Family: Nemacheilidae
- Genus: Triplophysa
- Species: T. sewerzowi

Binomial name
- Triplophysa sewerzowi (G. V. Nikolskii, 1938)

Synonyms
- Nemacheilus sewerzowi

Species of fish

Triplophysa sewerzowi, or Severtsov's loach, is a species of ray-finned fish in the genus Triplophysa.
