= Triplophysa drassensis =

Scientific classification
- Kingdom: Animalia
- Phylum: Chordata
- Class: Actinopterygii
- Order: Cypriniformes
- Family: Nemacheilidae
- Genus: Triplophysa
- Species: T. drassensis

Binomial name
- Triplophysa drassensis (Tilak, 1990)

Synonyms
- Nemacheilus drassensis Tilak, 1990

Species of fish

Triplophysa drassensis is a species of ray-finned fish in the genus Triplophysa.
