= Triplophysa microphysa =

Scientific classification
- Kingdom: Animalia
- Phylum: Chordata
- Class: Actinopterygii
- Order: Cypriniformes
- Family: Nemacheilidae
- Genus: Triplophysa
- Species: T. microphysa

Binomial name
- Triplophysa microphysa (P. W. Fang, 1935)

Species of fish

Triplophysa microphysa (commonly called Plateau Loach) is a species of ray-finned fish in the genus Triplophysa.
