= Triplophysa zhenfengensis =

Scientific classification
- Kingdom: Animalia
- Phylum: Chordata
- Class: Actinopterygii
- Division: Teleostei
- Order: Cypriniformes
- Family: Nemacheilidae
- Genus: Triplophysa
- Species: T. zhenfengensis

Binomial name
- Triplophysa zhenfengensis D. Z. Wang & D. J. Li, 2001

Species of fish

Triplophysa zhenfengensis is a species of stone loach in the genus Triplophysa. It is endemic to Longchang Town, Zhenfeng County, Guizhou Province, China, and first discovered in Guangxi.
