= Homatula pycnolepis =

Scientific classification
- Kingdom: Animalia
- Phylum: Chordata
- Class: Actinopterygii
- Order: Cypriniformes
- Family: Nemacheilidae
- Genus: Homatula
- Species: H. pycnolepis

Binomial name
- Homatula pycnolepis Y. T. Hu & E. Zhang, 2010

Species of fish

Homatula pycnolepis is a species of stone loach endemic to the upper Mekong drainage in China.
