= Lacertaspis chriswildi =

Conservation status
- Near Threatened (IUCN 3.1)

Scientific classification
- Kingdom: Animalia
- Phylum: Chordata
- Class: Reptilia
- Order: Squamata
- Family: Scincidae
- Genus: Lacertaspis
- Species: L. chriswildi

Binomial name
- Lacertaspis chriswildi (Böhme & Schmitz, 1996)

Synonyms
- Panaspis (Lacertaspis) chriswildi Böhme & Schmitz, 1996; Lacertaspis chriswildi — Schmitz, Ineich & Chirio, 2005

Species of lizard

Lacertaspis chriswildi, also known commonly as Chris Wild's snake-eyed skink, Chris-Wild's snake-eyed skink, and Chris-Wild's lidless skink, is a species of lizard in the family Scincidae. The species is endemic to Cameroon.

== Etymology ==
The specific name, chriswildi, is in honor of herpetologist Christopher Wild, who collected the holotype.

== Habitat ==
The preferred natural habitat of L. chriswildi is forest, at altitudes of 1,000–2,800 m (3,300–9,200 ft).

== Reproduction ==
The mode of reproduction of L. chriswildi is unknown.
