= Triplophysa furva =

Scientific classification
- Kingdom: Animalia
- Phylum: Chordata
- Class: Actinopterygii
- Order: Cypriniformes
- Family: Nemacheilidae
- Genus: Triplophysa
- Species: T. furva

Binomial name
- Triplophysa furva S. Q. Zhu, 1992

Species of fish

Triplophysa furva is a species of stone loach in the genus Triplophysa endemic to China. It was first described from near Ürümqi, Xinjiang.
