= Triplophysa macrophthalma =

Scientific classification
- Kingdom: Animalia
- Phylum: Chordata
- Class: Actinopterygii
- Order: Cypriniformes
- Family: Nemacheilidae
- Genus: Triplophysa
- Species: T. macrophthalma

Binomial name
- Triplophysa macrophthalma S. Q. Zhu & Q. Z. Guo, 1985

Species of fish

Triplophysa macrophthalma is a species of ray-finned fish in the genus Triplophysa.

== Footnotes ==
- Froese, Rainer; Pauly, Daniel (eds.). "Triplophysa macrophthalma". FishBase.
