= Triplophysa griffithii =

Conservation status
- Least Concern (IUCN 3.1)

- Vulnerable (IUCN 3.1)

Scientific classification
- Kingdom: Animalia
- Phylum: Chordata
- Class: Actinopterygii
- Order: Cypriniformes
- Family: Nemacheilidae
- Genus: Triplophysa
- Species: T. griffithii

Binomial name
- Triplophysa griffithii (Günther, 1868)

Synonyms
- Nemachilus griffithii Günther, 1868; Nemacheilus griffithi hazaraensis Omer & Mirza, 1975; Nemacheilus naziri Ahmad & Mirza, 1963; Triplophysa hazaraensis (Omer & Mirza, 1975)

Species of fish

Triplophysa griffithii is a small species of stone loach from Afghanistan and China. It grows to 8.3 cm (3.3 in) total length.
