= Triplophysa coniptera =

Conservation status
- Endangered (IUCN 3.1)

Scientific classification
- Kingdom: Animalia
- Phylum: Chordata
- Class: Actinopterygii
- Order: Cypriniformes
- Family: Nemacheilidae
- Genus: Triplophysa
- Species: T. coniptera

Binomial name
- Triplophysa coniptera (Turdakov, 1954)

Synonyms
- Nemacheilus conipterus; Nemachilus conipterus

Species of fish

Triplophysa coniptera is a species of stone loach in the genus Triplophysa. It occurs in the Talas River basin, Kyrgyzstan, and the middle Syr Darya basin, Uzbekistan. The latter population may qualify as the subspecies salari.
