= Triplophysa bashanensis =

Scientific classification
- Kingdom: Animalia
- Phylum: Chordata
- Class: Actinopterygii
- Order: Cypriniformes
- Family: Nemacheilidae
- Genus: Triplophysa
- Species: T. bashanensis

Binomial name
- Triplophysa bashanensis T. Q. Xu & K. F. Wang, 2009

Species of fish

Triplophysa bashanensis is a species of stone loach in the genus Triplophysa. It is found in a tributary of the Jialingjiang River in Shaaanxi Province, China.

== Description ==
Triplophysa bashanensis reaches a standard length of 10.7 cm (4.2 in).
