= Lacertaspis gemmiventris =

Conservation status
- Endangered (IUCN 3.1)

Scientific classification
- Kingdom: Animalia
- Phylum: Chordata
- Class: Reptilia
- Order: Squamata
- Suborder: Scinciformata
- Infraorder: Scincomorpha
- Family: Eugongylidae
- Genus: Lacertaspis
- Species: L. gemmiventris

Binomial name
- Lacertaspis gemmiventris (Sjöstedt, 1897)

Synonyms
- Lygosoma gemmiventris Sjöstedt, 1897; Riopa gemmiventris (Sjöstedt, 1897); Panaspis gemmiventris (Sjöstedt, 1897)

Species of lizard

Lacertaspis gemmiventris, also known as Sjostedt's five-toed skink, is a species of lizard in the family Scincidae. It is found in southwestern Cameroon and on the island of Bioko (Equatorial Guinea).
