= Triplophysa gracilis =

Conservation status
- Least Concern (IUCN 3.1)

Scientific classification
- Kingdom: Animalia
- Phylum: Chordata
- Class: Actinopterygii
- Order: Cypriniformes
- Family: Nemacheilidae
- Genus: Triplophysa
- Species: T. gracilis

Binomial name
- Triplophysa gracilis (Day, 1877)

Synonyms
- Nemacheilus gracilis Day, 1877 Nemachilus deterrai Hora, 1936 Triplophysa trewavasae Mirza & Ahmad, 1990

Species of fish

Triplophysa gracilis is a species of stone loach in the genus Triplophysa. It is found in Pakistan, India, and China. It grows to 11 cm (4.3 in) SL and lives in standing waters and deeper parts of rivers.
