= Triplophysa hialmari =

Scientific classification
- Kingdom: Animalia
- Phylum: Chordata
- Class: Actinopterygii
- Order: Cypriniformes
- Family: Nemacheilidae
- Genus: Triplophysa
- Species: T. hialmari

Binomial name
- Triplophysa hialmari Prokofiev, 2001

Species of fish

Triplophysa hialmari is a species of stone loach endemic to China. Its type locality is "Ba-tshu River", a tributary of the Yangtze River near Yushu City, Qinghai.
