= Triplophysa kashmirensis =

Conservation status
- Critically Endangered (IUCN 3.1)

Scientific classification
- Kingdom: Animalia
- Phylum: Chordata
- Class: Actinopterygii
- Order: Cypriniformes
- Family: Nemacheilidae
- Genus: Triplophysa
- Species: T. kashmirensis

Binomial name
- Triplophysa kashmirensis (Hora, 1922)

Synonyms
- Nemachilus kashmirensis

Species of fish

Triplophysa kashmirensis is a species of stone loach in the genus Triplophysa found in India and Pakistan.
