= Triplophysa brachyptera =

Scientific classification
- Kingdom: Animalia
- Phylum: Chordata
- Class: Actinopterygii
- Order: Cypriniformes
- Family: Nemacheilidae
- Genus: Triplophysa
- Species: T. brachyptera

Binomial name
- Triplophysa brachyptera (Herzenstein, 1888)

Species of fish

Triplophysa brachyptera is a species of stone loach in the genus Triplophysa. It is endemic to the Gansu Province, China. It grows to 13.7 cm (5.4 in) SL.
