= Triplophysa yasinensis =

Conservation status
- Least Concern (IUCN 3.1)

Scientific classification
- Kingdom: Animalia
- Phylum: Chordata
- Class: Actinopterygii
- Order: Cypriniformes
- Family: Nemacheilidae
- Genus: Triplophysa
- Subgenus: Indotriplophysa
- Species: T. yasinensis

Binomial name
- Triplophysa yasinensis (Alcock, 1898)

Synonyms
- Nemachilus yasinensis Alcock, 1898; Indotriplophysa yasinensis (Alcock, 1898)

Species of fish

Triplophysa yasinensis is a species of ray-finned fish in the genus Triplophysa.
