= Triplophysa alticeps =

Scientific classification
- Kingdom: Animalia
- Phylum: Chordata
- Class: Actinopterygii
- Order: Cypriniformes
- Family: Nemacheilidae
- Genus: Triplophysa
- Subgenus: Qinghaichthys
- Species: T. alticeps

Binomial name
- Triplophysa alticeps (Herzenstein, 1888)

Synonyms
- Nemachilus alticeps Herzenstein, 1888; Qinghaichthys alticeps (Herzenstein, 1888)

Species of fish

Triplophysa alticeps is a species of ray-finned fish in the genus Triplophysa. These stone loaches are occasionally placed in the genus Qinghaichthys by some authorities. It is endemic to Qinghaihu Lake in Qinghai Province, China.
