= Triplophysa bleekeri =

Scientific classification
- Kingdom: Animalia
- Phylum: Chordata
- Class: Actinopterygii
- Order: Cypriniformes
- Family: Nemacheilidae
- Genus: Triplophysa
- Species: T. bleekeri

Binomial name
- Triplophysa bleekeri (Sauvage & Dabry de Thiersant, 1874)

Species of fish

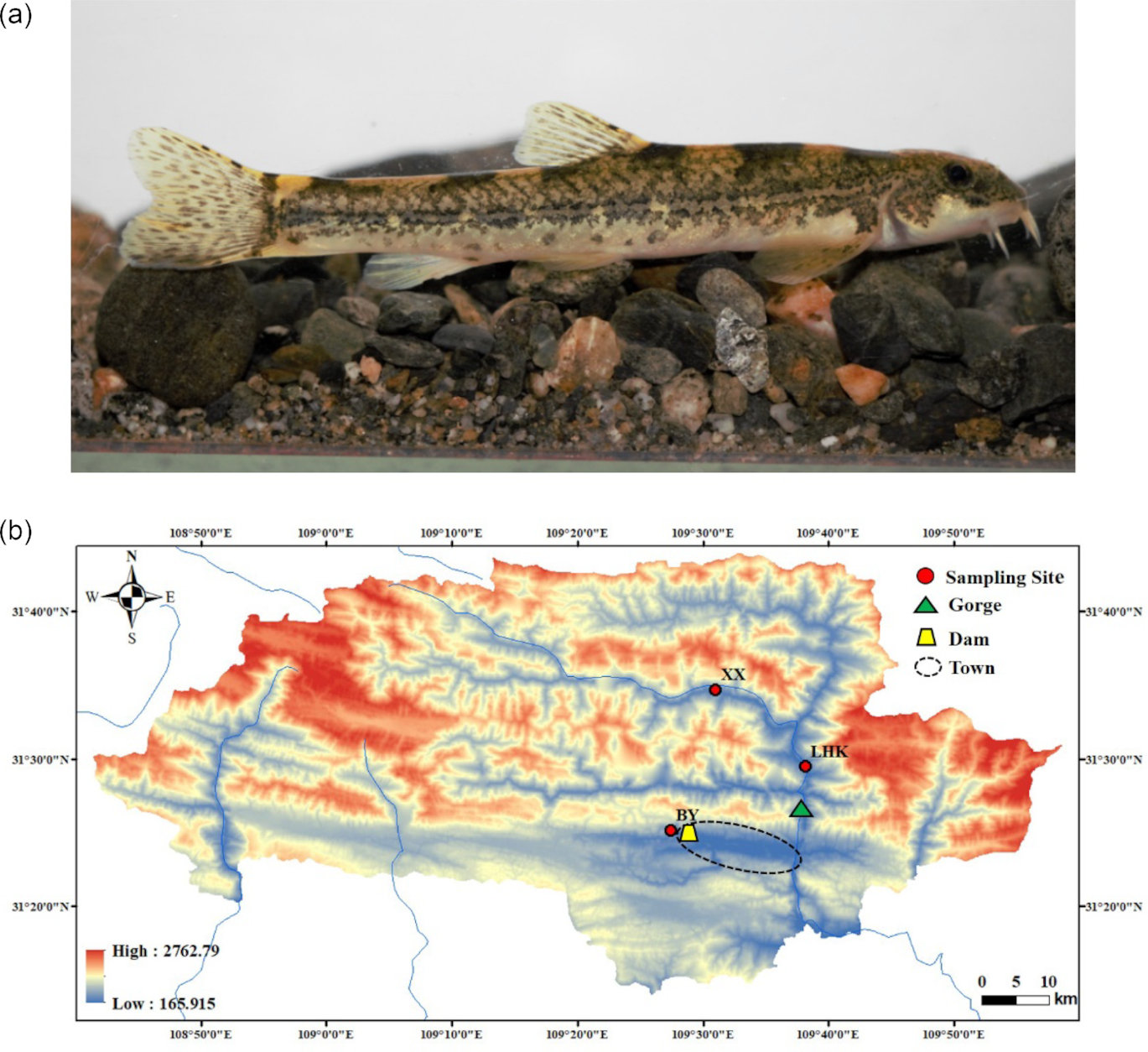
Morphology and geographic distribution of Triplophysa bleekeri, taken from GigaScience publication (CC-BY).

Triplophysa bleekeri is a species of stone loach in the genus Triplophysa. It is endemic to China. It grows to 8.2 cm (3.2 in) TL. Having a wide distribution across the Qinghai-Tibet Plateau, it lives in fast-flowing rivers from 200 to 3,000m in altitude. Being an unusual species inhabiting high-altitude regions, it is an excellent model to investigate the genetic mechanisms of adaptation to the local environment. With this in mind a chromosomal-scale genome assembly was sequenced and assembled with a genome size of ~628 Mb. This data finding that the Triplophysa genus likely diverged when the Qinghai-Tibet Plateau elevated by >4,000 m roughly 40 million years ago.

== Etymology ==
Although the fish's patronym is not identified but it is clearly in honor of Pieter Bleeker (1819-1878), a Dutch medical doctor and ichthyologist.
