= Triplophysa polyfasciata =

Scientific classification
- Kingdom: Animalia
- Phylum: Chordata
- Class: Actinopterygii
- Order: Cypriniformes
- Family: Nemacheilidae
- Genus: Triplophysa
- Species: T. polyfasciata

Binomial name
- Triplophysa polyfasciata R. H. Ding, 1996

Species of fish

Triplophysa polyfasciata is a species of ray-finned fish in the genus Triplophysa.

== Footnotes ==
- Froese, Rainer; Pauly, Daniel (eds.). "Triplophysa polyfasciata". FishBase.
