= Triplophysa bombifrons =

Scientific classification
- Kingdom: Animalia
- Phylum: Chordata
- Class: Actinopterygii
- Order: Cypriniformes
- Family: Nemacheilidae
- Genus: Triplophysa
- Subgenus: Tarimichthys
- Species: T. bombifrons

Binomial name
- Triplophysa bombifrons (Herzenstein, 1888)

Synonyms
- Nemachilus bombifrons Herzenstein, 1888; Tarimichthys bombifrons (Herzenstein, 1888)

Species of fish

Triplophysa bombifrons is a species of ray-finned fish, a stoneloach in the genus Triplophysa. Some authorities classify it in the separate genus or subgenus Tarimichthys. It is endemic to the Tarim River in Xinjiang.
