= Lacertaspis reichenowii =

Conservation status
- Least Concern (IUCN 3.1)

Scientific classification
- Kingdom: Animalia
- Phylum: Chordata
- Class: Reptilia
- Order: Squamata
- Family: Scincidae
- Genus: Lacertaspis
- Species: L. reichenowii

Binomial name
- Lacertaspis reichenowii (Peters, 1874)

Species of lizard

Lacertaspis reichenowii is a species of lizard in the family Scincidae. It is named after German ornithologist Anton Reichenow.

Lacertaspis reichenowii is endemic to Central Africa and is known from Cameroon, the Central African Republic, the Democratic Republic of the Congo, Bioko (Equatorial Guinea), and Gabon. It occurs in lowland tropical moist forest.
