= Triplophysa microphthalma =

Scientific classification
- Kingdom: Animalia
- Phylum: Chordata
- Class: Actinopterygii
- Division: Teleostei
- Order: Cypriniformes
- Family: Nemacheilidae
- Genus: Triplophysa
- Species: T. microphthalma

Binomial name
- Triplophysa microphthalma (Liao & Wang in Liao, Wang & Luo, 1997)

Synonyms
- Schistura dabryi microphthalmus Liao & Wang in Liao, Wang & Luo, 1997; Claea dabryi microphthalmus

Species of fish

Triplophysa microphthalma is a species of troglobitic stone loach. It is endemic to the Hawk cave system, Weng'an County, Guizhou, China.
