= Triplophysa xiangshuingensis =

Scientific classification
- Kingdom: Animalia
- Phylum: Chordata
- Class: Actinopterygii
- Order: Cypriniformes
- Family: Nemacheilidae
- Genus: Triplophysa
- Species: T. xiangshuingensis

Binomial name
- Triplophysa xiangshuingensis W. X. Li, 2004

Species of fish

Triplophysa xiangshuingensis is a species of ray-finned fish in the genus Triplophysa endemic to Shilin County, Yunnan, China.
