= Bashambhar Nath Chopra =

Zoologist

Bashambhar Nath Chopra or B. N. Chopra (1898 – 2 March 1966) was an Indian zoologist who specialized in crustacea and ichthyology at the Zoological Survey of India.

== Biography ==
Chopra received a DSc from Panjab University Lahore studying crustaceans and joined the Zoological Survey of India in 1923. He was an assistant superintendent until 1944 when he became director. After independence he served as an advisor for fisheries development to the Government of India.

Chopra collected aquatic fauna on several expeditions, particularly to Meghalaya, the Shan States and the Indawggyi Lake in Upper Burma and described a number of species, particularly decapods. A fish Triplophysa choprai named from a specimen collected by him was named in his honour by Sunder Lal Hora in 1934. Other species named after him include Danio choprae and Leoparreysia choprae (although the -ae ending is typically used for feminine names). During World War I, Chopra was involved in shifting the collections of the ZSI from Calcutta to Kaiser Castle belonging to Sir Jung Bahadur Rana in Benares. Some damage was caused when the Varuna river flooded into the building. Nearly all the 27,000 bird specimens were soaked.

== Selected publications ==
- Bopyrid Isopods Parasitic on Indian Decapoda Macrura (1923)
- 'Stomatopoda' in Zoology : The John Murray Expedition 1933-1934 (1939-1940)
