= Triplophysa crassilabris =

Scientific classification
- Kingdom: Animalia
- Phylum: Chordata
- Class: Actinopterygii
- Order: Cypriniformes
- Family: Nemacheilidae
- Genus: Triplophysa
- Species: T. crassilabris

Binomial name
- Triplophysa crassilabris R. H. Ding, 1994

Species of fish

Triplophysa crassilabris is a species of stone loach in the genus Triplophysa. It is endemic to China and was first described from the Xiaman Lake, Sichuan.
