= Triplophysa marmorata =

Conservation status
- Least Concern (IUCN 3.1)

Scientific classification
- Kingdom: Animalia
- Phylum: Chordata
- Class: Actinopterygii
- Division: Teleostei
- Order: Cypriniformes
- Family: Nemacheilidae
- Genus: Triplophysa
- Species: T. marmorata

Binomial name
- Triplophysa marmorata (Heckel, 1838)

Synonyms
- Cobitis marmorata

Species of fish

Triplophysa marmorata, the Kashmir triplophysa-loach, is a species of ray-finned fish found in Asia. It's a scaleless inland fish that is endemic of wetlands like the Wular Lake in Jammu and Kashmir, India. Like similar species T. kashmirensis, it presents a slender caudal peduncle, but it's shorter in the case of T. marmorata. Its specimens can also be differentiated because of their shorter lateral line length. Their diet is composed of detritus, plants (including algae) that coat rocks and stones, and the associated invertebrate fauna. They reach maturity after two years.
