= Lacertaspis lepesmei =

Conservation status
- Critically Endangered (IUCN 3.1)

Scientific classification
- Kingdom: Animalia
- Phylum: Chordata
- Class: Reptilia
- Order: Squamata
- Family: Scincidae
- Genus: Lacertaspis
- Species: L. lepesmei

Binomial name
- Lacertaspis lepesmei (Angel, 1940)

Synonyms
- Lygosoma (Leiolopisma) lepesmei Angel, 1940; Panaspis lepesmei (Angel, 1940)

Species of lizard

Lacertaspis lepesmei, also known commonly as Angel's five-toed skink, is a species of lizard in the subfamily Eugongylinae of the family Scincidae. The species is endemic to the Bambouto Massif, Cameroon.

== Etymology ==
L. lepesmei is named after French entomologist Pierre Lepesme.

== Habitat ==
The preferred natural habitat of L. lepesmei is rocky areas of savanna, at altitudes around 2,200 m (7,200 ft).

== Reproduction ==
L. lepesmei is oviparous.
