= Triplophysa tanggulaensis =

Scientific classification
- Kingdom: Animalia
- Phylum: Chordata
- Class: Actinopterygii
- Order: Cypriniformes
- Family: Nemacheilidae
- Genus: Triplophysa
- Species: T. tanggulaensis

Binomial name
- Triplophysa tanggulaensis (S. Q. Zhu, 1982)

Species of fish

Triplophysa tanggulaensis is a species of ray-finned fish in the genus Triplophysa.

== Footnotes ==
- Froese, Rainer; Pauly, Daniel (eds.). "Triplophysa tanggulaensis". FishBase.
