= Triplophysa eugeniae =

Scientific classification
- Kingdom: Animalia
- Phylum: Chordata
- Class: Actinopterygii
- Order: Cypriniformes
- Family: Nemacheilidae
- Genus: Triplophysa
- Subgenus: Indotriplophysa
- Species: T. eugeniae

Binomial name
- Triplophysa eugeniae Prokofiev, 2002

Synonyms
- Indotriplophysa eugeniae (Prokofiev, 2002)

Species of fish

Triplophysa eugeniae is a species of ray-finned fish in the genus Triplophysa.
