= Triplophysa qiubeiensis =

Scientific classification
- Kingdom: Animalia
- Phylum: Chordata
- Class: Actinopterygii
- Order: Cypriniformes
- Family: Nemacheilidae
- Genus: Triplophysa
- Species: T. qiubeiensis

Binomial name
- Triplophysa qiubeiensis W. X. Li & H. F. Yang, 2008

Species of fish

Triplophysa qiubeiensis is a species of ray-finned fish in the genus Triplophysa. They can be found at Nijiao Village, Qiubei County, Yunnan Province.

== Footnotes ==
- Froese, Rainer; Pauly, Daniel (eds.). "Triplophysa qiubeiensis". FishBase.
