= Triplophysa tibetana =

Conservation status
- Least Concern (IUCN 3.1)

Scientific classification
- Kingdom: Animalia
- Phylum: Chordata
- Class: Actinopterygii
- Order: Cypriniformes
- Family: Nemacheilidae
- Genus: Triplophysa
- Species: T. tibetana

Binomial name
- Triplophysa tibetana (Regan, 1905)

Species of fish

Triplophysa tibetana is a species of stone loach in the genus Triplophysa. It is endemic to the upper Brahmaputra and upper Indus rivers in Tibet. It lives in slower flowing, shallow areas in lakes and rivers with ample aquatic vegetation. It grows to 13.3 cm (5.2 in) SL.
