= Triplophysa edsinica =

Scientific classification
- Kingdom: Animalia
- Phylum: Chordata
- Class: Actinopterygii
- Order: Cypriniformes
- Family: Nemacheilidae
- Genus: Triplophysa
- Subgenus: Tarimichthys
- Species: T. edsinica

Binomial name
- Triplophysa edsinica Prokofiev, 2003

Synonyms
- Tarimichthys edsinicus (Prokofiev, 2003)

Species of fish

Tarimichthys edsinicus is a species of ray-finned fish, a stone loach, in the genus Triplophysa, although some authorities place it in the subgebus or genus Tarimichthys. It is found in the Edsin River which flows into the endorheic Juyan Lake.
