= Triplophysa farwelli =

Scientific classification
- Kingdom: Animalia
- Phylum: Chordata
- Class: Actinopterygii
- Order: Cypriniformes
- Family: Nemacheilidae
- Genus: Triplophysa
- Species: T. farwelli

Binomial name
- Triplophysa farwelli (Hora, 1935)

Synonyms
- Nemachilus farwelli Hora, 1935

Species of fish

Triplophysa farwelli is a species of stone loach in the genus Triplophysa. It is found in Iran and the Helmand River drainage in Afghanistan.

== Etymology ==
The fish is named in honor of Major Arthur Evelyn Farwell (1898-1976), the Military Attaché to the British Legation at Kabul, Afghanistan. It was he who sent the type specimen to the Bombay Natural History Society.
