= Triplophysa paradoxa =

Conservation status
- Endangered (IUCN 3.1)

Scientific classification
- Kingdom: Animalia
- Phylum: Chordata
- Class: Actinopterygii
- Order: Cypriniformes
- Family: Nemacheilidae
- Genus: Triplophysa
- Species: T. paradoxa

Binomial name
- Triplophysa paradoxa (Turdakov, 1955)

Synonyms
- Nemachilus paradoxus

Species of fish

Triplophysa paradoxa, the Talas stone loach, is a species of stone loach in the genus Triplophysa. It is found in the Talas River Basin in Kyrgyzstan and some small rivers in the Karatau Mountains (South Kazakhstan).
