= Triplophysa shehensis =

Scientific classification
- Kingdom: Animalia
- Phylum: Chordata
- Class: Actinopterygii
- Order: Cypriniformes
- Family: Nemacheilidae
- Genus: Triplophysa
- Species: T. shehensis

Binomial name
- Triplophysa shehensis Menon, 1987

Synonyms
- Noemacheilus shehensis Tilak, 1990; Triplophysa shehensis (Tilak, 1990)

Species of fish

Triplophysa shehensis is a species of ray-finned fish in the genus Nemacheilus from India. Some authorities place T. shehensis in Nemacheilus.
