= Triplophysa daqiaoensis =

Scientific classification
- Kingdom: Animalia
- Phylum: Chordata
- Class: Actinopterygii
- Order: Cypriniformes
- Family: Nemacheilidae
- Genus: Triplophysa
- Species: T. daqiaoensis

Binomial name
- Triplophysa daqiaoensis R. H. Ding, 1993

Species of fish

Triplophysa daqiaoensis is a species of stone loach in the genus Triplophysa. It is endemic to China and was first discovered in Sichuan. It grows to 14.5 cm (5.7 in) TL.

== Morphology ==
- Males can reach up to 14.5 cm in total length.
