= Triplophysa nasobarbatula =

Scientific classification
- Kingdom: Animalia
- Phylum: Chordata
- Class: Actinopterygii
- Division: Teleostei
- Order: Cypriniformes
- Family: Nemacheilidae
- Genus: Triplophysa
- Species: T. nasobarbatula

Binomial name
- Triplophysa nasobarbatula D. Z. Wang & D. J. Li, 2001

Species of fish

Triplophysa nasobarbatula is a species of ray-finned fish in the genus Triplophysa. It is endemic from Wengang Township and Dongtang Township, Libo County, Guizhou Province.
