= Triplophysa chondrostoma =

Scientific classification
- Kingdom: Animalia
- Phylum: Chordata
- Class: Actinopterygii
- Order: Cypriniformes
- Family: Nemacheilidae
- Genus: Triplophysa
- Species: T. chondrostoma

Binomial name
- Triplophysa chondrostoma (Herzenstein, 1888)

Species of fish

Triplophysa chondrostoma is a species of stone loach in the genus Triplophysa. It is endemic to the Qaidam Basin in Qinghai Province, China. It grows to 7.7 cm (3.0 in) SL.
