= Lacertaspis rohdei =

Conservation status
- Least Concern (IUCN 3.1)

Scientific classification
- Kingdom: Animalia
- Phylum: Chordata
- Class: Reptilia
- Order: Squamata
- Suborder: Scinciformata
- Infraorder: Scincomorpha
- Family: Eugongylidae
- Genus: Lacertaspis
- Species: L. rohdei

Binomial name
- Lacertaspis rohdei (Müller, 1910)

Species of lizard

Lacertaspis rohdei, also known as the Gabon lidless skink or Gaboon lidless skink, is a species of lizard in the family Scincidae. It is named after Reinhold Theodor Rohde, Australian missionary.

Lacertaspis rohdei is endemic to Central Africa and is known from Cameroon, Equatorial Guinea, Gabon, and the Republic of the Congo. It occurs in leaf litter in lowland and montane forests.
