= Triplophysa (Qinghaichthys) =

Scientific classification
- Kingdom: Animalia
- Phylum: Chordata
- Class: Actinopterygii
- Order: Cypriniformes
- Family: Nemacheilidae
- Genus: Triplophysa
- Subgenus: Qinghaichthys; S. Q. Zhu, 1981

Type species
- Nemacheilus alticeps Herzenstein, 1888

Genus of fishes

Qinghaichthys is a subgenus the genus Triplophysa, stone loaches native to China. Some authorities recognise this as a valid genus but this is not recognised by Fishbase.

== Species ==
There are currently four recognized species in this genus, if it is accepted as valid:

- Triplophysa (Qinghaichthys) alticeps (Herzenstein, 1888)
- Triplophysa (Qinghaichthys) rotundiventris (Y. F. Wu & Yuan Chen, 1979)
- Triplophysa (Qinghaichthys) zaidamensis (Kessler, 1874)
- Triplophysa (Qinghaichthys) zamegacephalus (T. Q. Zhao, 1985)
