= Triplophysa anshuiensis =

Scientific classification
- Kingdom: Animalia
- Phylum: Chordata
- Class: Actinopterygii
- Division: Teleostei
- Order: Cypriniformes
- Family: Nemacheilidae
- Genus: Triplophysa
- Species: T. anshuiensis

Binomial name
- Triplophysa anshuiensis T. J. Wu, M. U. Wei, J. H. Lan & L. N. Du, 2018

Species of fish

Triplophysa anshuiensis

Triplophysa anshuiensis is a species of stone loach in the family Nemacheilidae. It is endemic to Lingyun County in Guangxi, China, where it lives in a karst cave.

== Etymology ==
The specific name anshuiensis is due to the type locality of the species, village Anshui located closer to Xijiang River, China.

== Description ==
It grows to 6.9 cm (2.7 in) SL. Eyes are absent. Mouth is inferior. Gill rakers are absent in outer row, however eight gill rakers found in inner row on first gill arch. Scales are absent on body. Lateral line is complete. Elongated body is slightly compressed anteriorly and strongly compressed posteriorly. Thick lips have shallow furrows. Three pairs of barbels are present. Dorsal and anal fins are truncate. Pectoral fins are slightly developed. Caudal fin forked and tips are pointed.
