= Triplophysa sellaefer =

Scientific classification
- Kingdom: Animalia
- Phylum: Chordata
- Class: Actinopterygii
- Order: Cypriniformes
- Family: Nemacheilidae
- Genus: Triplophysa
- Species: T. sellaefer

Binomial name
- Triplophysa sellaefer (Nichols, 1925)

Species of fish

Triplophysa sellaefer is a species of ray-finned fish in the genus Triplophysa.
