= Triplophysa leptosoma =

Scientific classification
- Kingdom: Animalia
- Phylum: Chordata
- Class: Actinopterygii
- Order: Cypriniformes
- Family: Nemacheilidae
- Genus: Triplophysa
- Subgenus: Indotriplophysa
- Species: T. leptosoma

Binomial name
- Triplophysa leptosoma (Herzenstein, 1888)

Synonyms
- Nemachilus stoliczkae leptosoma Herzenstein, 1888; Nemachilus stoliczkae productus Herzenstein, 1888; Indotriplophysa leptosoma (Herzenstein, 1888)

Species of fish

Triplophysa leptosoma is a species of stone loach in the family Nemacheilidae. It is endemic to China. Sources differ on its distribution, citing either as "Tibet" or "upper Yangtze River basin in Qinghai and Gansu".

It can grow to 14.4 cm (5.7 in) standard length.
