= Triplophysa alexandrae =

Scientific classification
- Kingdom: Animalia
- Phylum: Chordata
- Class: Actinopterygii
- Order: Cypriniformes
- Family: Nemacheilidae
- Genus: Triplophysa
- Species: T. alexandrae

Binomial name
- Triplophysa alexandrae Prokofiev, 2001

Species of fish

Triplophysa alexandrae is a species of stone loach in the genus Triplophysa endemic to Sichuan, China.

== Etymology ==
The fish is named in honor of Alexandra Viktorovna Potanina (1843-1893), the wife and traveling companion of Grigory Nikolayaevich Potanin (1835-1920), a Russian explorer of Central Asia.
