= Triplophysa tenuis =

Scientific classification
- Kingdom: Animalia
- Phylum: Chordata
- Class: Actinopterygii
- Order: Cypriniformes
- Family: Nemacheilidae
- Genus: Triplophysa
- Subgenus: Indotriplophysa
- Species: T. tenuis

Binomial name
- Triplophysa tenuis (F. Day, 1877)

Synonyms
- Indotriplophysa tenuis Day, 1877; Nemacheilus tenuis Day, 1877

Species of fish

Triplophysa tenuis is a species of ray-finned fish in the genus Triplophysa.
