= Triplophysa hexiensis =

Scientific classification
- Kingdom: Animalia
- Phylum: Chordata
- Class: Actinopterygii
- Order: Cypriniformes
- Family: Nemacheilidae
- Genus: Triplophysa
- Species: T. hexiensis

Binomial name
- Triplophysa hexiensis (T. Q. Zhao & X. T. Wang, 1988)

Synonyms
- Nemachilus dorsonotatus hexiensis T. Q. Zhao & X. T. Wang, 1988; Triplophysa rossoperegrinatorum Prokofiev, 2001

Species of fish

Triplophysa hexiensis is a species of stone loach endemic to China. It is known from Ruo Shui and Shiyang Rivers in northern China.
