= Micronemacheilus bailianensis =

Conservation status
- Endangered (IUCN 3.1)

Scientific classification
- Kingdom: Animalia
- Phylum: Chordata
- Class: Actinopterygii
- Order: Cypriniformes
- Family: Nemacheilidae
- Genus: Micronemacheilus
- Species: M. bailianensis

Binomial name
- Micronemacheilus bailianensis (J. Yang, 2013)

Synonyms
- Yunnanilus bailianensis Yang, 2013; Heminoemacheilus bailianensis (J. Yang, 2013)

Species of fish

Micronemacheilus bailianensis is a troglobitic species of freshwater ray-finned fish, a stone loach from the genus Micronemacheilus. Its type locality is disputed with some authorities stating it is the Heilongtan Reservoir in Shilin County, Yunnan the reservoir is in the drainage system of the Ba Jiang, from which the species' specific name may derive, although other authorities give the type location and the specific name derivation as Bailian Cave near Liuzhou in Guangxi Province.
