= Triplophysa angeli =

Scientific classification
- Kingdom: Animalia
- Phylum: Chordata
- Class: Actinopterygii
- Order: Cypriniformes
- Family: Nemacheilidae
- Genus: Triplophysa
- Species: T. angeli

Binomial name
- Triplophysa angeli (P. W. Fang, 1941)

Species of fish

Triplophysa angeli is a species of stone loach in the genus Triplophysa. It is endemic to the Yalong River in Sichuan, China. It grows to 12.9 cm (5.1 in) SL.

== Etymology ==
The specific name honours the herpetologist Fernand Angel (1881–1950) of the Muséum national d'Histoire naturelle in Paris, "who was "always interested" (translation) in Fang's work".
