= Triplophysa xingshanensis =

Scientific classification
- Kingdom: Animalia
- Phylum: Chordata
- Class: Actinopterygii
- Order: Cypriniformes
- Family: Nemacheilidae
- Genus: Triplophysa
- Species: T. xingshanensis

Binomial name
- Triplophysa xingshanensis (G. R. Yang & C. X. Xie, 1983)

Species of fish

Triplophysa xingshanensis is a species of ray-finned fish in the genus Triplophysa.

== Footnotes ==
- Froese, Rainer; Pauly, Daniel (eds.). "Triplophysa xingshanensis". FishBase.
