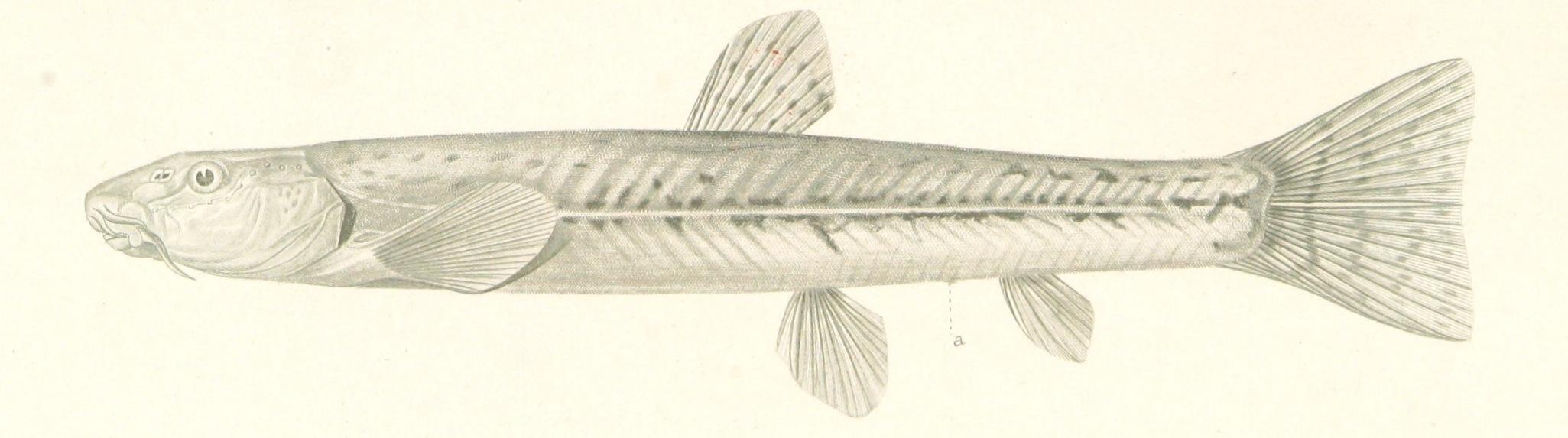

Conservation status
- Least Concern (IUCN 3.1)

Scientific classification
- Kingdom: Animalia
- Phylum: Chordata
- Class: Actinopterygii
- Order: Cypriniformes
- Family: Nemacheilidae
- Genus: Triplophysa
- Species: T. dalaica

Binomial name
- Triplophysa dalaica (Kessler, 1876)

Synonyms
- Diplophysa dalaica Kessler, 1876

= Triplophysa dalaica =

Species of fish

Triplophysa dalaica is a species of stone loach. It is only known from Hulun Lake in Inner Mongolia, China; it is believed to occur more widely as fish in this genus typically occur in running water.

Triplophysa dalaica has been used as model species to study adaptation to high-altitude hypoxia. 13 positively selected genes involved in hypoxia response have been identified. The specimen in question was captured in the Yellow River in Zoigê County, northern Sichuan.
