= Triplophysa scleroptera =

Scientific classification
- Kingdom: Animalia
- Phylum: Chordata
- Class: Actinopterygii
- Order: Cypriniformes
- Family: Nemacheilidae
- Genus: Triplophysa
- Species: T. scleroptera

Binomial name
- Triplophysa scleroptera (Herzenstein, 1888)

Species of fish

Triplophysa scleroptera is a species of ray-finned fish in the genus Triplophysa.

== Footnotes ==
- Froese, Rainer; Pauly, Daniel (eds.). "Triplophysa scleroptera". FishBase.
