= Triplophysa brahui =

Conservation status
- Endangered (IUCN 3.1)

Scientific classification
- Kingdom: Animalia
- Phylum: Chordata
- Class: Actinopterygii
- Order: Cypriniformes
- Family: Nemacheilidae
- Genus: Triplophysa
- Species: T. brahui

Binomial name
- Triplophysa brahui (Zugmayer, 1912)

Synonyms
- Nemachilus brahui

Species of fish

Triplophysa brahui is a species of stone loach in the genus Triplophysa. It is found in Baluchistan, Pakistan and in the Helmand River watershed in Afghanistan.
