= Triplophysa aquaecaeruleae =

Scientific classification
- Kingdom: Animalia
- Phylum: Chordata
- Class: Actinopterygii
- Order: Cypriniformes
- Family: Nemacheilidae
- Genus: Triplophysa
- Species: T. aquaecaeruleae

Binomial name
- Triplophysa aquaecaeruleae Prokofiev, 2001

Species of fish

Triplophysa aquaecaeruleae is a species of stone loach in the genus Triplophysa. It is endemic to China.
