= Triplophysa choprai =

Conservation status
- Least Concern (IUCN 3.1)

Scientific classification
- Kingdom: Animalia
- Phylum: Chordata
- Class: Actinopterygii
- Order: Cypriniformes
- Family: Nemacheilidae
- Genus: Triplophysa
- Subgenus: Indotriplophysa
- Species: T. choprai

Binomial name
- Triplophysa choprai (Hora, 1934)

Synonyms
- Nemachilus choprai Hora, 1934; Indotriplophysa choprai (Hora, 1934)

Species of fish

Triplophysa choprai, the snow loach, is a species of ray-finned fish in the subgenus Indotriplophysa of genus Triplophysa.

It is named after Bashambhar Nath Chopra (1898–1966), who collected the holotype, and assisted Sunder Lal Hora with the species description.
