= Triplophysa dorsalis =

Conservation status
- Least Concern (IUCN 3.1)

Scientific classification
- Kingdom: Animalia
- Phylum: Chordata
- Class: Actinopterygii
- Order: Cypriniformes
- Family: Nemacheilidae
- Genus: Triplophysa
- Species: T. dorsalis

Binomial name
- Triplophysa dorsalis (Kessler, 1872)

Synonyms
- Cobitis dorsalis; Nemacheilus dorsalis

Species of fish

Triplophysa dorsalis, the grey stone loach, is a species of stone loach in the genus Triplophysa that lives in freshwater. It is found in Uzbekistan, Kazakhstan, Kyrgyzstan and Xinjiang (westernmost China).

The species is usually found in water with slow currents, river coves and lakes. It prefers the quiet water to live in. Its maximum length is 13 centimetres (5.1 in) TL and the common length is 12 centimetres (4.7 in) SL. Lives at range of temperature of 18 °C-22 °C.
