= Triplophysa yaopeizhii =

Scientific classification
- Kingdom: Animalia
- Phylum: Chordata
- Class: Actinopterygii
- Order: Cypriniformes
- Family: Nemacheilidae
- Genus: Triplophysa
- Species: T. yaopeizhii

Binomial name
- Triplophysa yaopeizhii T. Q. Xu, C. G. Zhang & B. Cai, 1995

Species of fish

Triplophysa yaopeizhii is a species of stone loach endemic to Tibet.
