= Triplophysa lixianensis =

Scientific classification
- Kingdom: Animalia
- Phylum: Chordata
- Class: Actinopterygii
- Order: Cypriniformes
- Family: Nemacheilidae
- Genus: Triplophysa
- Species: T. lixianensis

Binomial name
- Triplophysa lixianensis C. L. He, Z. B. Song & E. Zhang, 2008

Species of fish

Triplophysa lixianensis is species of stone loach, family Nemacheilidae. It is endemic to the upper Yangtze River basin, China.

It can grow to 15 cm (5.9 in) standard length.
