= Triplophysa xiangxiensis =

Conservation status
- Vulnerable (IUCN 2.3)

Scientific classification
- Kingdom: Animalia
- Phylum: Chordata
- Class: Actinopterygii
- Order: Cypriniformes
- Family: Nemacheilidae
- Genus: Triplophysa
- Species: T. xiangxiensis

Binomial name
- Triplophysa xiangxiensis (G. Y. Yang, F. X. Yuan & Y. M. Liao, 1986)

Species of fish

Triplophysa xiangxiensis is a species of stone loach endemic to Yuan River in Hunan, China. It is a cave-dwelling species. It grows to 9.9 cm (3.9 in) SL.
