= Homatula laxiclathra =

Scientific classification
- Kingdom: Animalia
- Phylum: Chordata
- Class: Actinopterygii
- Order: Cypriniformes
- Family: Nemacheilidae
- Genus: Homatula
- Species: H. laxiclathra

Binomial name
- Homatula laxiclathra J. H. Gu & E. Zhang, 2012

Species of fish

Homatula laxiclathra is a species of stone loach that is endemic to China.

== Description ==
This species reaches a standard length (SL) of 13.7 cm (5.4 in).
