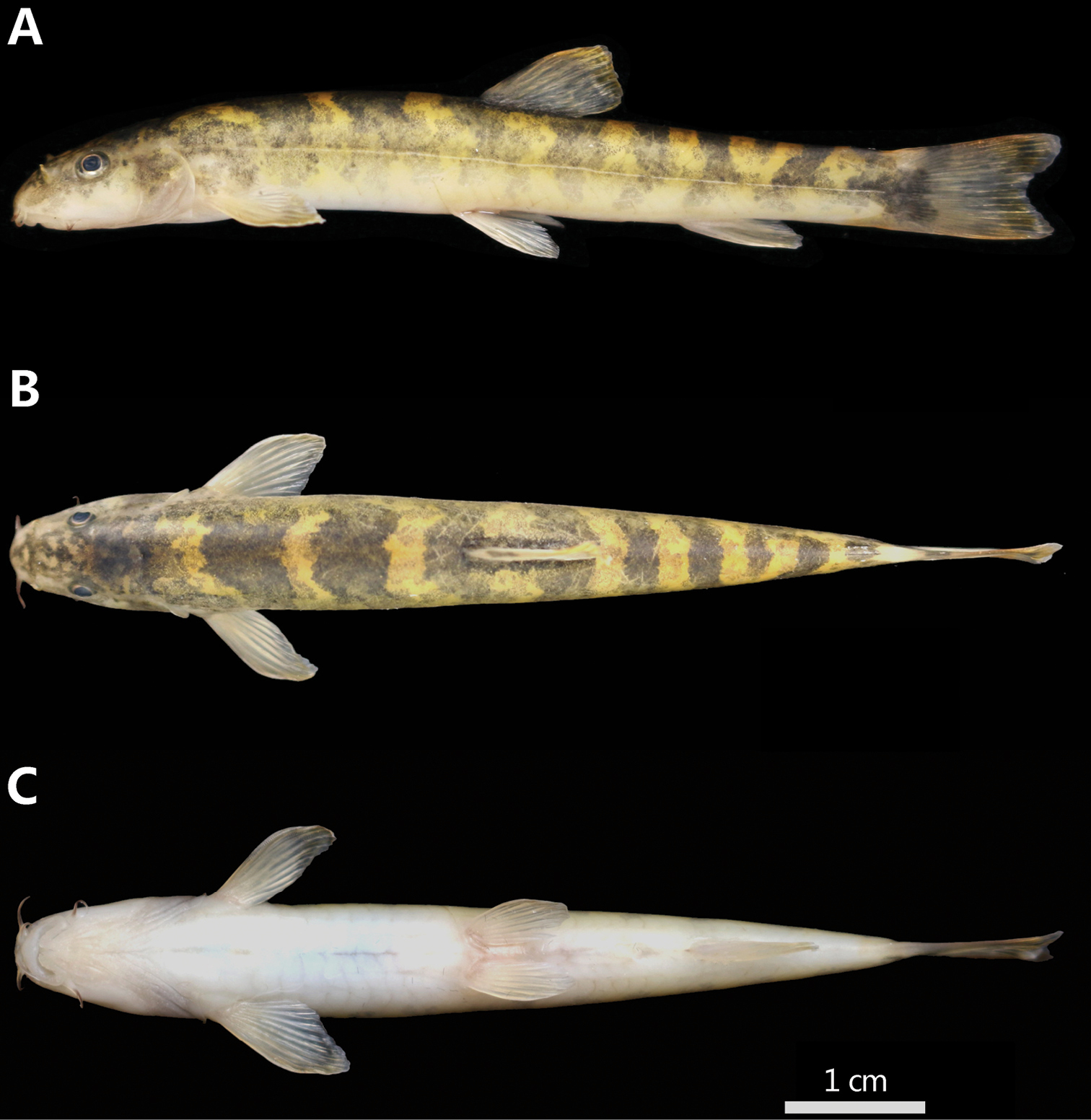
- Triplophysa wulongensis

Scientific classification
- Kingdom: Animalia
- Phylum: Chordata
- Class: Actinopterygii
- Order: Cypriniformes
- Family: Nemacheilidae
- Genus: Triplophysa
- Species: T. wulongensis

Binomial name
- Triplophysa wulongensis S.Chen, Sheraliev, Shu & Peng, 2021

= Triplophysa wulongensis =

Species of fish

Triplophysa wulongensis is a species of ray-finned fish in the genus Triplophysa endemic to a single subterranean pool in Furong Cave, Wulong County, Chongqing, China.
