= Triplophysa bellibarus =

Scientific classification
- Kingdom: Animalia
- Phylum: Chordata
- Class: Actinopterygii
- Order: Cypriniformes
- Family: Nemacheilidae
- Genus: Triplophysa
- Species: T. bellibarus

Binomial name
- Triplophysa bellibarus (T. L. Tchang, T. H. Yueh & H. C. Hwang, 1963)

Species of fish

Triplophysa bellibarus is a species of stone loach in the genus Triplophysa.

== Etymology ==
The fish's name is the latinization of the Anglo-Saxon belly and bar, referring to the six brownish transverse bars on the abdomen.
