= Triplophysa xiqiensis =

Scientific classification
- Kingdom: Animalia
- Phylum: Chordata
- Class: Actinopterygii
- Order: Cypriniformes
- Family: Nemacheilidae
- Genus: Triplophysa
- Species: T. xiqiensis

Binomial name
- Triplophysa xiqiensis R. H. Ding & Q. Lai, 1996

Species of fish

Triplophysa xiqiensis is a species of stone loach endemic to China.
