= Triplophysa gundriseri =

Conservation status
- Least Concern (IUCN 3.1)

Scientific classification
- Kingdom: Animalia
- Phylum: Chordata
- Class: Actinopterygii
- Order: Cypriniformes
- Family: Nemacheilidae
- Genus: Triplophysa
- Species: T. gundriseri

Binomial name
- Triplophysa gundriseri Prokofiev, 2002

Synonyms
- Triplophysa gundriseri chandagaitensis Prokofiev, 2002

Species of fish

Triplophysa gundriseri is a species of stone loach from Mongolia and Tuva (Russia).
