= Triplophysa robusta =

Scientific classification
- Kingdom: Animalia
- Phylum: Chordata
- Class: Actinopterygii
- Order: Cypriniformes
- Family: Nemacheilidae
- Genus: Triplophysa
- Species: T. robusta

Binomial name
- Triplophysa robusta (Kessler, 1876)

Species of fish

Triplophysa robusta is a species of ray-finned fish in the genus Triplophysa.

== Distribution ==
It can be found in the Huanghe River, and the Hexi interior system in China.
