= Triplophysa longliensis =

Scientific classification
- Domain: Eukaryota
- Kingdom: Animalia
- Phylum: Chordata
- Class: Actinopterygii
- Order: Cypriniformes
- Family: Nemacheilidae
- Genus: Triplophysa
- Species: T. longliensis

Binomial name
- Triplophysa longliensis Ren, Yang & Chen, 2012

Species of fish

Triplophysa longliensis is a species of ray-finned fish in the genus Triplophysa. It is endemic from Longli County, Guizhou Province.
