= Triplophysa incipiens =

Scientific classification
- Kingdom: Animalia
- Phylum: Chordata
- Class: Actinopterygii
- Order: Cypriniformes
- Family: Nemacheilidae
- Genus: Triplophysa
- Species: T. incipiens

Binomial name
- Triplophysa incipiens (Herzenstein, 1888)

Synonyms
- Nemachilus bombifrons incipiens Herzenstein, 1888; Tarimichthys incipens Herzenstein, 1888

Species of fish

Triplophysa incipiens is a species of ray-finned fish in the genus Triplophysa.
