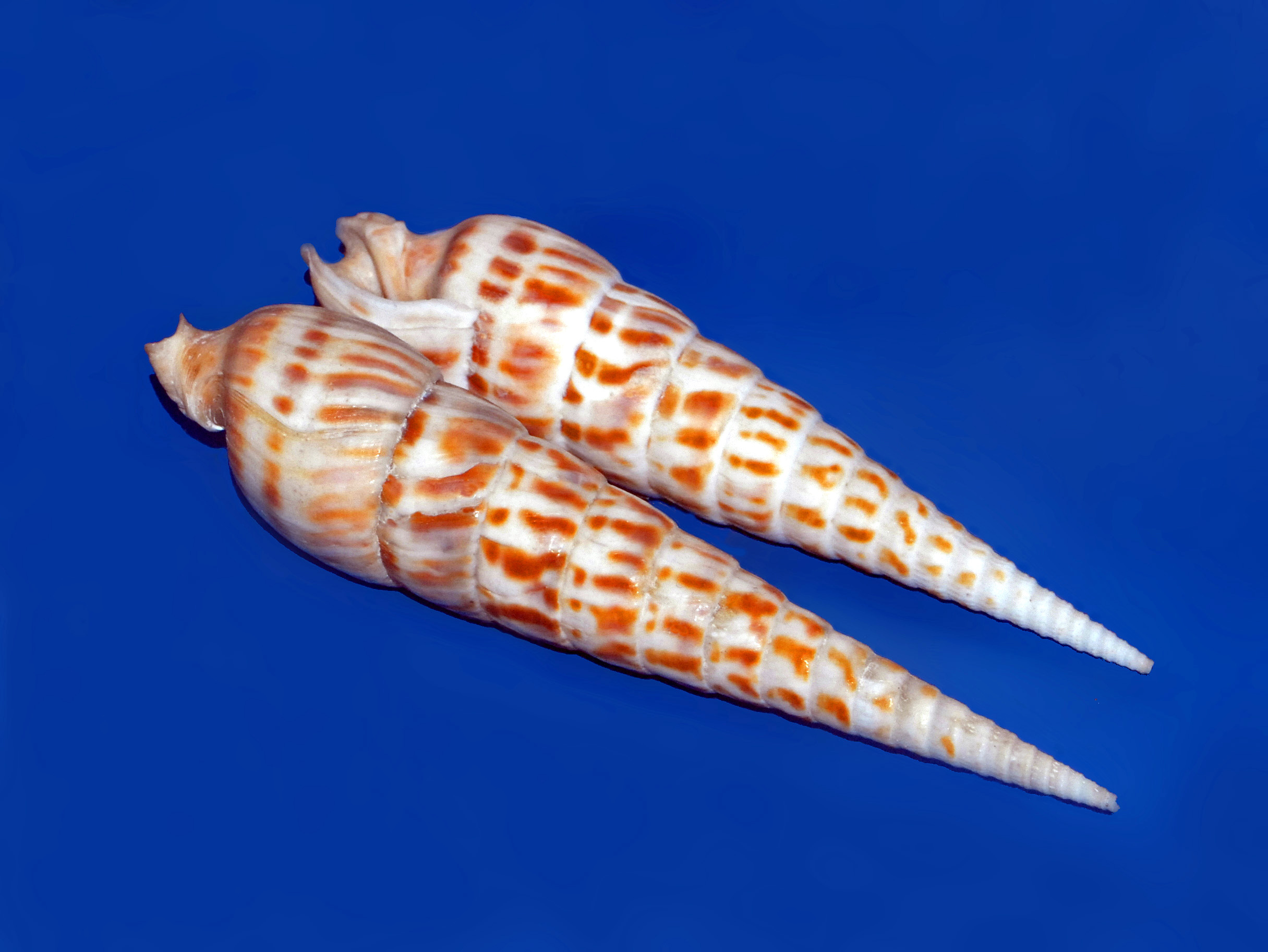
- Shell of Terebra robusta from Panama at the Museo Civico di Storia Naturale di Milano

Scientific classification
- Kingdom: Animalia
- Phylum: Mollusca
- Class: Gastropoda
- Subclass: Caenogastropoda
- Order: Neogastropoda
- Family: Terebridae
- Genus: Terebra
- Species: T. robusta

Binomial name
- Terebra robusta Hinds, 1844

Synonyms
- Terebra dumbauldi Hanna & Hertlein, 1961; Terebra insignis Deshayes, 1857; Terebra lingualis Hinds, 1844; Terebra looisii Guérin-Ménenville, 1854

= Terebra robusta =

Species of gastropod

Terebra robusta, common name robust auger, is a species of sea snail, a marine gastropod mollusc in the family Terebridae, the auger snails.

== Description ==
Terebra robusta has a shell reaching a length of 30 – 155 mm and a diameter of about 34 mm. The surface of this large shell ranges from whitish to beige, with brown spots along the spirals.

== Distribution ==
This species can be found in Baja California, from Mexico to Peru and in Galápagos. It lives commonly at a depth of about 90 m.
