= Alu Ancient Cave =

- Luyuan Cave
- Interactive map of Alu Ancient Cave
- Location: Luxi County, Kunming City

The Alu Ancient Cave (simplified Chinese: 阿庐古洞; traditional Chinese: 阿廬古洞), also named Luyuan Cave, is a karst cave group located in Luxi County, more than 160 kilometers from Kunming. Referred to as the "First Cave of Yunnan", it contains three caves and one river, namely Luyuan Cave, Yuzhu Cave, Biyu Cave and Yushu River.

Alu Ancient Cave is one of the AAAA Tourist Attractions of China, the Ming Dynasty geographer Xu Xiake twice entered the Cave for inspection, and wrote it into the Xu Xiake's Travels.
