= Fernand Angel =

French herpetologist (1881–1950)

Fernand Angel (2 February 1881, Douzy – 13 July 1950, Paris) was a French herpetologist.

In 1905 he began work as Assistant Preparator under Léon Vaillant and François Mocquard at the Muséum national d'histoire naturelle in Paris. Later on, he became Curator of the herpetology collection at the museum, a position he maintained for several decades until the time of his death in 1950.

He specialized in herpetofauna native to Madagascar, Indochina and the French colonies of Western Africa. Most of his scientific papers were in the field of systematics.

For four years (1914–1918) he served in the French Army in World War I.

== Published works ==
He performed illustrative work for the volume on reptiles in the series "Mission scientifique au Mexique et dans l'Amérique Centrale", complementing the other drawings done by Marie Firmin Bocourt. Other noted works by Fernand Angel are:

- Contribution à l'étude systématique des lézards appartenant aux genres Uroplatus et Brookesia, 1929 - Contribution to the systematics of lizards belonging to the genera Uroplatus and Brookesia.
- Reptiles et amphibiens, 1946 - Reptiles and amphibians.
- Vie et mœurs des amphibiens, 1947 - Life and behaviour of amphibians.
- Petit atlas des amphibiens et reptiles, 1949 - Small atlas of amphibians and reptiles.
- Vie et mœurs des serpents, 1950 - Life and behaviour of snakes.

== Eponymy ==
- Angel's caecilian, Geotrypetes angeli.
- Angel's keelback, Rhabdophis angeli.
- Angel's chameleon, Furcifer angeli.
- Angel's dwarf gecko, Lygodactylus decaryi.
- Angel's five-toed skink, Lacertaspis lepesmei.
- Angel's kukri snake, Oligodon macrurus.
- Angel's mountain keelback, Paratapinophis praemaxillaris.
- Angel's petite gecko, Paragehyra petiti.
- Angel's writhing skink, Lygosoma angeli.
- The stone loach Triplophysa angeli (P. W. Fang, 1941) is named after him.
