= Triplophysa tenuicauda =

Conservation status
- Data Deficient (IUCN 3.1)

Scientific classification
- Kingdom: Animalia
- Phylum: Chordata
- Class: Actinopterygii
- Order: Cypriniformes
- Family: Nemacheilidae
- Genus: Triplophysa
- Species: T. tenuicauda

Binomial name
- Triplophysa tenuicauda (Steindachner, 1866)

Synonyms
- Cobitis tenuicauda Steindachner, 1866; Indotriplophysa tenuicauda Steindachner, 1866; Triplophysa ladacensis Günther, 1868

Species of fish

Triplophysa tenuicauda is a species of stone loach in the genus Triplophysa, found in China, India and Pakistan.
