= Triplophysa hutjertjuensis =

Scientific classification
- Kingdom: Animalia
- Phylum: Chordata
- Class: Actinopterygii
- Order: Cypriniformes
- Family: Nemacheilidae
- Genus: Triplophysa
- Species: T. hutjertjuensis

Binomial name
- Triplophysa hutjertjuensis (Rendahl (de), 1933)

Synonyms
- Nemacheilus hutjertjuensis Rendahl, 1933

Species of fish

Triplophysa hutjertjuensis is a species of stone loach found in Mongolia and China.
