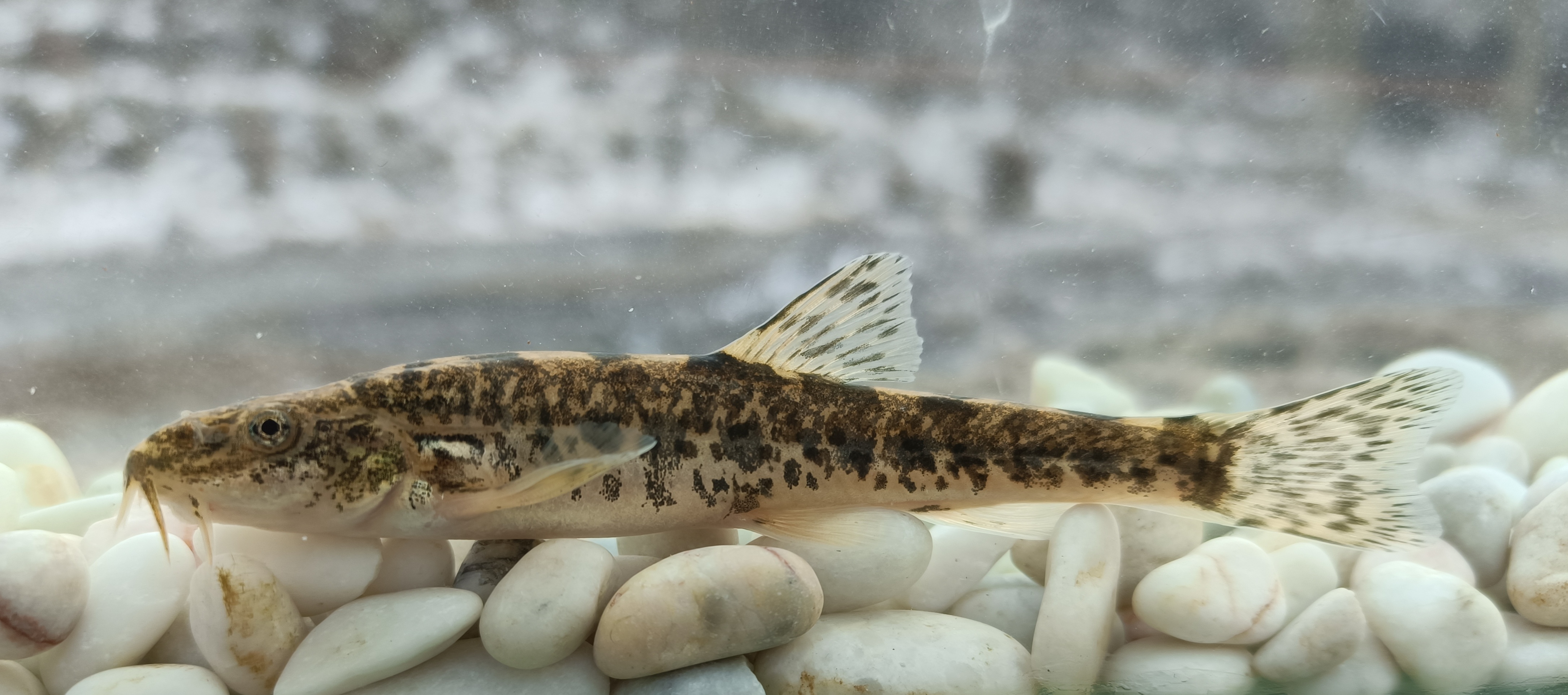
- Triplophysa ferganaensis
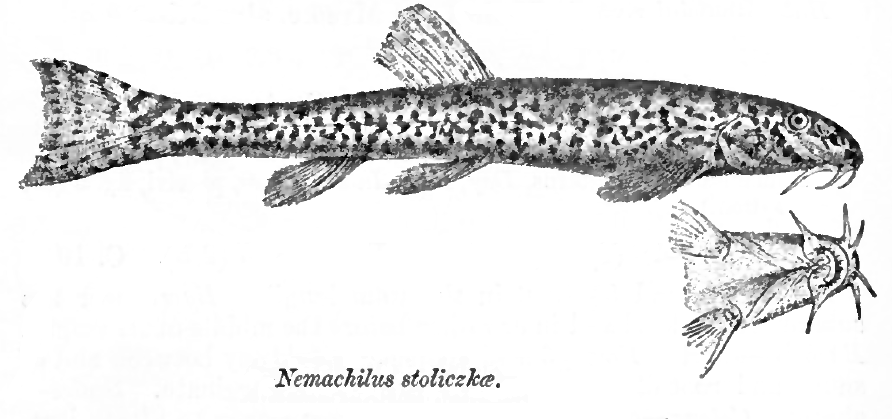
- Triplophysa stolickai

Scientific classification
- Kingdom: Animalia
- Phylum: Chordata
- Class: Actinopterygii
- Division: Teleostei
- Order: Cypriniformes
- Family: Nemacheilidae
- Genus: Triplophysa; Rendahl (de), 1933

Type species
- Nemacheilus hutjertjuensis Rendahl, 1933

Synonyms
- See text

= Triplophysa =

Genus of fishes

Triplophysa is a genus of fish in the family Nemacheilidae found mainly in and around the Qinghai-Tibet Plateau in China, as well as inland waters of the larger part of central Asia. They can be distinguished from other genera of Nemacheilidae by marked sexual dimorphism, including the development of nuptial tubercles on breeding males. Currently, the genus is a mixed assemblage of species. Some lineages have been identified and treated as subgenera (Hedinichthys, Indotriplophysa, Labiatophysa, Qinghaichthys and Tarimichthys), but as Wikipedia follows Fishbase for fish species all but Hedinichthys have been treated as subgenera in Wikipedia, although Kottelat in his revision of the loaches did recognise them as valid. FishBase, however, includes these in Triplophysa without specifying subgenera and treats the names given by Kottelat as synonyms.

== Ecology ==
Triplophysa zhaoi holds the record for the lowest altitude for Asian fish: it is found at 50 m (160 ft) below sea level in swamps of the Lükqün oasis, in the Turpan Depression in Xinjiang. In the other end, Triplophysa stolickai holds the record altitude for Asian fish: it is found at 5,200 m (17,100 ft) above sea level in hot springs near the Longmu Lake in western Tibet. Triplophysa dalaica has been used as model species to study adaptation to high-altitude hypoxia and 13 positively selected genes involved in hypoxia response have been identified. Some species are blind cave-dwellers.

== Species ==
These are the currently recognized species in this genus:

- Triplophysa akhtari (M. A. Vijaylakshmanan, 1950)
- Triplophysa alexandrae Prokofiev, 2001
- Triplophysa aliensis (Y. F. Wu & S. Q. Zhu, 1979)
- Triplophysa alticeps (Herzenstein, 1888)
- Triplophysa altipinnis Prokofiev, 2003
- Triplophysa aluensis W. X. Li & Z. G. Zhu, 2000
- Triplophysa angeli (P. W. Fang, 1941)
- Triplophysa anlongensis C.-T. Lan, L.-X. Song, T. Luo, X.-R. Zhao, N. Xiao & J. Zhou, 2023
- Triplophysa anshuiensis T.-J. Wu, M.-L. Wei, J.-H. Lan & L.-N. Du, 2018
- Triplophysa anterodorsalis S. Q. Zhu & W. X. Cao, 1989
- Triplophysa aquaecaeruleae Prokofiev, 2001
- Triplophysa arnoldii Prokofiev, 2006
- Triplophysa baotianensis C. Li, T. Liu, R. Li & W. Li, 2018
- Triplophysa bashanensis T. Q. Xu & K. F. Wang, 2009
- Triplophysa bellibarus (T. L. Tchang, T. H. Yueh & H. C. Hwang, 1963)
- Triplophysa bleekeri (Sauvage & Dabry de Thiersant, 1874)
- Triplophysa bombifrons (Herzenstein, 1888)
- Triplophysa brachyptera (Herzenstein, 1888)
- Triplophysa brahui (Zugmayer, 1912)
- Triplophysa brevibarba R. H. Ding, 1993
- Triplophysa brevicauda (Herzenstein, 1888)
- Triplophysa cakaensis W. X. Cao & S. Q. Zhu, 1988
- Triplophysa cehengensis T. Luo, M.-L. Mao, X.-R. Zhao, N. Xiao & J. Zhou, 2023
- Triplophysa chandagaitensis Prokofiev, 2002
- Triplophysa chondrostoma (Herzenstein, 1888)
- Triplophysa choprai (Hora, 1934)
- Triplophysa coniptera (Turdakov, 1954)
- Triplophysa crassicauda (Herzenstein, 1888)
- Triplophysa crassilabris R. H. Ding, 1994
- Triplophysa cuneicephala (T. H. Shaw & T. L. Tchang, 1931)
- Triplophysa dalaica (Kessler 1876)
- Triplophysa daochengensis Y. Y. Wu, Z. Y. Sun & Y. S. Guo, 2016
- Triplophysa daqiaoensis R. H. Ding, 1993
- Triplophysa daryoae Sheraliev, Kayumova & Peng, 2022 (Sokh stone loach)
- Triplophysa dorsalis (Kessler, 1872)
- Triplophysa dorsonotata (Kessler, 1879)
- Triplophysa drassensis (Tilak, 1990)
- Triplophysa edsinica Prokofiev, 2003
- Triplophysa elegans (Kessler, 1874)
- Triplophysa erythraea Z.-X. Liu & X.-L. Huang, 2019.
- Triplophysa eugeniae Prokofiev, 2002
- Triplophysa farwelli (Hora, 1935)
- Triplophysa fengshanensis J. H. Lan, 2013
- Triplophysa ferganaensis Sheraliev & Peng, 2021 (Fergana stone loach)
- Triplophysa flavicorpus J. X. Yang, X. Y. Chen & J. H. Lan, 2004
- Triplophysa furva S. Q. Zhu, 1992
- Triplophysa fuxianensis J. X. Yang & X. L. Chu, 1990
- Triplophysa gerzeensis W. X. Cao & S. Q. Zhu, 1988
- Triplophysa gracilis (F. Day, 1877)
- Triplophysa griffithii (Günther, 1868)
- Triplophysa guizhouensis W.-J. Wu, A.-Y. He, J.-X. Yang & L.-N. Du, 2018
- Triplophysa gundriseri Prokofiev, 2002
- Triplophysa hexiensis (T. Q. Zhao & X. T. Wang, 1988).
- Triplophysa heyangensis S. Q. Zhu, 1992
- Triplophysa hialmari Prokofiev, 2001
- Triplophysa hsutschouensis (Rendahl, 1933)
- Triplophysa huanglongensis Gao 1992
- Triplophysa huapingensis L. P. Zheng, J. X. Yang & X. Y. Chen, 2012
- Triplophysa huidongensis Xiong & Y.-S. Guo, 2021
- Triplophysa hutjertjuensis (Rendahl, 1933)
- Triplophysa incipiens (Herzenstein, 1888)
- Triplophysa intermedia (Kessler, 1876)
- Triplophysa jianchuanensis L. P. Zheng, L. N. Du, X. Y. Chen & J. X. Yang, 2010 (Jianchuan stone loach)
- Triplophysa jinchuanensis Tan & Guo, 2021
- Triplophysa kafirnigani (Turdakov, 1948)
- Triplophysa kashmirensis (Hora, 1922)
- Triplophysa kokshaalensis Prokofiev, 2017
- Triplophysa kullmanni Bănărescu, Nalbant & Ladiges, 1975
- Triplophysa kungessana (Kessler, 1879)
- Triplophysa lacusnigri (Berg, 1928)
- Triplophysa lacustris J. X. Yang & X. L. Chu, 1990
- Triplophysa langpingensis J. Yang, 2013
- Triplophysa laterimaculata J. L. Li, N. F. Liu & J. X. Yang, 2007
- Triplophysa leptosoma (Herzenstein, 1888)
- Triplophysa lixianensis C. L. He, Z. B. Song & E. Zhang, 2008
- Triplophysa longianguis Y. F. Wu & C. Z. Wu, 1984
- Triplophysa longipectoralis L. P. Zheng, L. N. Du, X. Y. Chen & J. X. Yang, 2009
- Triplophysa longliensis Q. Ren, J. X. Yang & X. Y. Chen, 2012
- Triplophysa luochengensis Li, J., J.-H. Lan, X. Y. Chen & L. N. Du, 2017
- Triplophysa macrocephala J. Yang, T. J. Wu & J. X. Yang, 2012
- Triplophysa macromaculata J. X. Yang, 1990
- Triplophysa macrophthalma S. Q. Zhu & Q. Z. Guo, 1985
- Triplophysa markehenensis (S. Q. Zhu & Y. F. Wu, 1981)
- Triplophysa marmorata (Heckel, 1838)
- Triplophysa microphthalma ((Liao & Wang, 1997)
- Triplophysa microphysa (P. W. Fang, 1935)
- Triplophysa microps (Steindachner 1866)
- Triplophysa minxianensis (X.-T. Wang & S. Q. Zhu, 1979)
- Triplophysa nandanensis J. H. Lan, J. X. Yang & Y. R. Chen, 1995
- Triplophysa nanpanjiangensis (S. Q. Zhu & W. X. Cao, 1988)
- Triplophysa nasobarbatula D. Z. Wang & D. J. Li, 2001
- Triplophysa ninglangensis Y. F. Wu & C. Z. Wu, 1988
- Triplophysa nujiangensa X. Y. Chen, G. H. Cui & J. X. Yang], 2004
- Triplophysa obscura X. T. Wang, 1987
- Triplophysa obtusirostra Y. F. Wu & C. Z. Wu, 1988
- Triplophysa orientalis (Herzenstein, 1888)
- Triplophysa panguri (Hora, 1936)
- Triplophysa panzhouensis J. Yu, T. Luo, C. T. Lan, N. Xiao & J. Zhou, 2023
- Triplophysa papillosolabiata (Kessler, 1879)
- Triplophysa pappenheimi (P. W. Fang, 1935)
- Triplophysa paradoxa (Turdakov, 1955)
- Triplophysa parva Z. M. Chen, W. X. Li & J. X. Yang, 2009
- Triplophysa polyfasciata R. H. Ding, 1996
- Triplophysa posterodorsalus (W.-X. Li, J.-C. Ran & H.-M. Chen, 2006)
- Triplophysa pseudoscleroptera (S. Q. Zhu & Y. F. Wu, 1981)
- Triplophysa pseudostenura C. L. He, E. Zhang & Z. B. Song, 2012
- Triplophysa qilianensis W. J. Li, X. C. Chen & Y. P. Hu, 2015
- Triplophysa qingzhenensis F. Liu, Z.-X. Zeng & Gong, 2022
- Triplophysa qini S.Q. Deng, X.-B. Wang & E. Zhang 2022
- Triplophysa qiubeiensis W. X. Li & H. F. Yang, 2008
- Triplophysa retropinnis (Herzenstein, 1888)
- Triplophysa robusta (Kessler, 1876)
- Triplophysa rongduensis M.-L. Mao, X.-R. Zhao, J. Yu, N. Xiao & J. Zhou, 2023
- Triplophysa rosa X. Y. Chen & J. X. Yang, 2005
- Triplophysa rotundiventris (Y. F. Wu & Y. R. Chen, 1979)
- Triplophysa sanduensis S.-J. Chen & Z.-G. Peng, 2019
- Triplophysa scapanognatha Prokofiev, 2007
- Triplophysa scleroptera (Herzenstein, 1888)
- Triplophysa sellaefer (Nichols, 1925)
- Triplophysa sewerzowi (Nikolskij, 1938) (Severtsov's loach)
- Triplophysa shaanxiensis J. X. Chen, 1987
- Triplophysa shannanensis M. Wang, J. Huang, Y. Chen & D. He, 2024
- Triplophysa shashiguii Y.Y. Wu & Y.S. Guo, 2021
- Triplophysa shehensis Menon, 1987
- Triplophysa shilinensis Y. R. Chen & J. X. Yang, 1992
- Triplophysa shiyangensis (T. Q. Zhao & X. T. Wang, 1983)
- Triplophysa siluroides (Herzenstein, 1888)
- Triplophysa stenura (Herzenstein, 1888)
- Triplophysa stewarti (Hora, 1922)
- Triplophysa stolickai (Steindachner, 1866)
- Triplophysa strauchii (Kessler, 1874)
- Triplophysa tanggulaensis S. Q. Zhu, 1982)
- Triplophysa tenuicauda (Steindachner, 1866)
- Triplophysa tenuis (Day, 1877)
- Triplophysa tianeensis X. Y. Chen, G. H. Cui & J. X. Yang, 2004
- Triplophysa tianlinensis J. Li, X.-H. Li, J.-H. Lan & L.-N. Du, 2016
- Triplophysa tianxingensis H. F. Yang, W. X. Li & Z. M. Chen, 2016
- Triplophysa tibetana (Regan, 1905)
- Triplophysa turpanensis Y. F. Wu & C. Z. Wu, 1992
- Triplophysa ulacholica (V. P. Anikin, 1905) (Issyk-kul naked loach)
- Triplophysa uranoscopus (Kessler, 1872)
- Triplophysa venusta S. Q. Zhu & W. X. Cao, 1988
- Triplophysa waisihani L. Cao & E. Zhang, 2008
- Triplophysa weiheensis C.-G. Feng , Y. Zhang, C. Tong, Zhou & K. Zhao, 2020
- Triplophysa wudangensis F. Liu, Z.-X. Zeng & Z. Gong 2022
- Triplophysa wulongensis S.-J. Chen, Sheraliev, L. Shu & Z. Peng, 2021
- Triplophysa wuweiensis ((S. C. Li & S. Y. Chang, 1974)
- Triplophysa xiangshuingensis W. X. Li, 2004
- Triplophysa xiangxiensis (G. Y. Yang, F. X. Yuan & Y. M. Liao, 1986)
- Triplophysa xichangensis S.-Q. Zhu & W.-X. Cao 1989
- Triplophysa xingshanensis (G. R. Yang & C. X. Xie, 1983)
- Triplophysa xingyiensis (Yuan et al., 2026)
- Triplophysa xiqiensis R. H. Ding & Q. Lai, 1996
- Triplophysa xuanweiensis Z.-M. Lu, X.-J. Li, W.-N. Mao & Y.-H. Zhao 2022
- Triplophysa yajiangensis S. L. Yan, Z. Y. Sun & Y. S. Guo, 2015
- Triplophysa yaluwang C.-T. Lan, Y.-W. Liu, J.-J. Zhou & J. Zhou 2024
- Triplophysa yaopeizhii T. Q. Xu, C. G. Zhang & B. Cai, 1995
- Triplophysa yasinensis (Alcock, 1898)
- Triplophysa yunnanensis J. X. Yang, 1990
- Triplophysa yuzeshengi Y. S. Guo & Z. Y. Sun, 2021
- Triplophysa zaidamensis (Kessler, 1876)
- Triplophysa zamegacephala (T. Q. Zhao, 1985)
- Triplophysa zhaoi Prokofiev, 2006
- Triplophysa zhenfengensis D. Z. Wang & D. J. Li, 2001
- Triplophysa ziyunensis L. Wu, T. Luo, N. Xiao & J. Zhou, 2024
