= Cao Wenxuan (ichthyologist) =

Chinese ichthyologist

- 曹文宣
- Born: May 1934 (age 92); Pengzhou, Sichuan, China
- Education: Sichuan University
- Scientific career
- Fields: Ichthyology
- Workplaces: Chinese Academy of Sciences (CAS)

Cao Wenxuan (Chinese: 曹文宣; pinyin: Cáo Wénxuān; born May 1934) is a Chinese ichthyologist, a former researcher and doctoral supervisor at the Institute of Hydrobiology, Chinese Academy of Sciences (CAS).

== Biography ==
Cao was born in Pengzhou, Sichuan in May 1934. In September 1951, he was accepted to Sichuan University, where he majored in animal science at the Department of Biology. After graduating in July 1955, he was assigned to the Institute of Hydrobiology, Chinese Academy of Sciences (CAS).

He was a member of the 8th and 9th National Committee of the Chinese People's Political Consultative Conference. He was a delegate to the 10th National People's Congress.

== Honours and awards ==
- December 1997 Academician of the Chinese Academy of Sciences (CAS)
- State Natural Science Award (First Class and Second Class)
