= Hialmar Rendahl =

Swedish zoologist, cartoonist and painter (1891–1969)

Carl Hialmar Rendahl (born Jönköping 26 December 1891; died Stockholm 2 May 1969) was a Swedish zoologist, cartoonist and painter. He is most famous in Sweden for his authorship of Fågelboken, the "bird book" which sold 60,000 copies.

Rendahl attended Jönköping University, graduating in 1910 and moving on to Stockholm University where he studied Zoology, Botany and Geography gaining a Bachelor of Philosophy degree in 1916. He was awarded a Licentiate's degree in Zoology in 1918 and he then achieved a Doctor of Philosophy and was appointed an Associate Professor in Zoology 1924. In 1933 he was appointed Professor at the Swedish Museum of Natural History.

As a student, he worked as a freelance journalist, mainly writing popular science articles, and he also translated books into the Nordic languages as well as publishing drawings. He started working at the Vertebrate Department of the Swedish Museum of Natural History in 1912 and started ringing birds in 1913. From 1913 he wrote a series of zoological papers and dissertations about vertebrates. He edited the biography of Alfred Brehm between 1929 and 1931. He was the editor for the series of 12 books called Vi och vår värld ("Us and our World"), two of which he wrote. He also studied the fish collected in Australia by the Swedish expedition led by Eric Mjöberg and by the Norwegian Knut Dahl, describing several new species from each.

Rendahl was honoured as a Professor Emeritus in January 1958 and retired from the Museum. He continued his work up to a week before he died. He worked on, among other things, the phenology of birds which migrated into and out of Sweden. His main interests were in ichthyology, especially the stone loaches of the family Cobitidae and the flat loaches of the family Balitoridae, and herpetology.

He was also a very active artist with a sizeable portfolio of watercolours, gouache, wax crayon and pastels, often abstracts which reflected his compositions and reflect his lively imagination and appreciation of form and colour.

== See also ==
- Category:Taxa named by Carl Hialmar Rendahl
