= Chen Xiao-Yong =

Chen Xiaoyong
- 陈小勇
- Education: Northwest Normal University; Lanzhou University; University of Chinese Academy of Sciences
- Known for: Ichthyology and fish taxonomy
- Scientific career
- Fields: Ichthyology
- Workplaces: Kunming Institute of Zoology, Chinese Academy of Sciences

Chen Xiaoyong, also written as Chen Xiao-Yong, (陈小勇) is a Chinese ichthyologist and a research fellow at the Kunming Institute of Zoology, Chinese Academy of Sciences.

== Biography ==
Chen received his bachelor's degree from Northwest Normal University in 1993, his master's degree from Lanzhou University in 1996, and his doctorate from the Kunming Institute of Zoology in 1999. After completing his doctorate, he remained at the institute as a research fellow.

== Taxa authored ==
The following taxa were authored by Xiao-Yong Chen:

- Clupisoma nujiangense
- Garra incisorbis
- Microdevario microphthalma
- Microrasbora microphthalma
- Oreoglanis hponkanensis
- Paralepidocephalus translucens
- Sinocyclocheilus huizeensis
- Streptocephalus shinsawbuae
- Triplophysa longliensis
- Yaoshania
- Yunnanilus qujinensis

== Selected publications ==
- Chen, X.Y., Ferraris, C.J. & Yang, J.X. 2005. A new species of catfish of the genus Clupisoma (Siluriformes: Schilbeidae) from the Salween River, Yunnan, China. Copeia 2005: 566–570.
- Yang, J., Chen, X. & Yang, J. 2008. Clarification of the nomenclatural status of Gymnodiptychus integrigymnatus (Cypriniformes, Cyprinidae). Zootaxa, 1897: 67–68.
- Jiang, Y.-E., Chen, X.-Y. & Yang, J.-X. 2008. Microrasbora Annandale, a new genus record in China, with description of a new species (Teleostei: Cyprinidae). Environmental Biology of Fishes 83: 299–304. doi:10.1007/s10641-008-9336-8
- Du, Li-Na; Yang, Jun-Xia; Chen, Xiao-Yong (2011). "A new species of Trochotaia (Caenogastropoda: Viviparidae) from Yunnan, China". Molluscan Research. 31 (2): 85–89. Archived from the original on 2019-07-28.
- Chen, X.-Y.; Neely, D.A. 2012: Schistura albirostris, a new nemacheiline loach (Teleostei: Balitoridae) from the Irrawaddy River drainage of Yunnan Province, China. Zootaxa 3586: 222–227.
- Du, L.-N., Chen, X.-Y. & Yang, J.-X. 2013. A catalog of fish specimens preserved within Kunming Institute of Zoology, Chinese Academy of Sciences. Zoological Research 34(4): 345–360.
- Lu, H.-F.; Du, L.-N.; Li, Z.-Q.; Chen, X.-Y.; Yang, J.-X. (2014). "Morphological analysis of the Chinese Cipangopaludina species (Gastropoda; Caenogastropoda; Viviparidae)". Zoological Research. 35 (6): 510–527. doi:10.13918/j.issn.2095-8137.2014.6.510. Archived from the original on 2019-07-13.
- Cheng, C., Pan, X., Chen, X., Li, J., Ma, L. & Yang, J. 2015. A new species of the genus Sinocyclocheilus (Teleostei: Cypriniformes), from Jinshajiang Drainage, Yunnan, China. Cave Research, 1(2): 4.
- Du, L.-N., Lu, Y.-F. & Chen X.-Y., 2015: Yunnanilus qujinensis, a new species of loach from Yunnan, southwest China (Teleostei: Nemacheilidae). Ichthyological Exploration of Freshwaters, 26(3): 249–254.
- Liu, S.-W., Yang, J.-X. & Chen, X.-Y. 2016. Paralepidocephalus translucens, a new species of loach from a cave in eastern Yunnan, China (Teleostei: Cobitidae). Ichthyological Exploration of Freshwaters, 27(1): 61–66.
- Yang, K-F., Jiang, W-S., Chen, X-Y., Zhou, W. & Yang, J-X. 2016. An integrative approach to reappraising species validity in Pseudexostoma (Teleostei: Sisoridae). Zootaxa 4158(3): 352–366. doi:10.11646/zootaxa.4158.3.3
- Zheng, L.-P., Yang, J.-X. & Chen, X.-Y. 2016. Garra incisorbis, a new species of labeonine from Pearl River basin in Guangxi, China (Teleostei: Cyprinidae). Ichthyological Exploration of Freshwaters, 26(4) [2015]: 299-303.
- Zheng, L-P., Chen, X-Y. & Yang, J-X. 2016. Molecular systematics of the Labeonini inhabiting the karst regions in southwest China (Teleostei, Cypriniformes). ZooKeys 612: 133-148. doi:10.3897/zookeys.612.9085.
- Chen, X-Y., Qin, T. & Chen, Z-Y. 2017. Oreoglanis hponkanensis, a new sisorid catfish from north Myanmar (Actinopterygii, Sisoridae). ZooKeys 646: 95–108. doi:10.3897/zookeys.646.11049.
- Shu, S-S., Brancelj, A., Chen, F-Z., Yang, J-X. & Chen, X-Y. 2017. A new freshwater stygobiotic calanoid (Copepoda: Speodiaptominae) from Yunnan, China. Zootaxa 4290(1): 192–200. doi:10.11646/zootaxa.4290.1.12.
- Shu, S-S., Rogers, D.C., Chen, X-Y. & Sanoamuang, L-O. 2018. Streptocephalus diversity in Myanmar, with description of a new species (Branchiopoda, Anostraca). ZooKeys 734: 1–12. doi:10.3897/zookeys.734.21153.
