= Wu Yun-Fei =

Chinese ichthyologist and Qinghai-Tibet Plateau biologist

- 武云飞
- Born: 1938 (age 87–88); Qingdao, Shandong, China
- Occupations: Ichthyologist, zoologist
- Known for: Research on the fish fauna of the Qinghai–Tibet Plateau

Academic work
- Institutions: Ocean University of China
- Notable works: Fishes of the Qinghai-Xizang Plateau (1992); Marine Vertebrate Zoology (2013)

Wu Yun-Fei (Chinese: 武云飞; born 1938) is a Chinese ichthyologist and biologist specialising in the Qinghai–Tibet Plateau and its fish fauna. He is a professor at the College of Fisheries, Ocean University of China. His research has focused on fish taxonomy, morphology and fisheries science, particularly the classification and study of fishes inhabiting the Qinghai–Tibet Plateau.

Between 1961 and 1993, Wu worked in Qinghai, where he was employed by the Northwest Institute of Plateau Biology, part of the Chinese Academy of Sciences. During this period, he conducted extensive research and field surveys of fish and other biological resources in the high-altitude regions of western China.

== Academic career ==
Wu was born in 1938 in Qingdao, Shandong, China. He began working in Qinghai in 1961 and spent more than three decades conducting biological investigations in the region. From 1961 to 1993, he worked at the Northwest Institute of Plateau Biology, where he focused on the fish fauna and biological resources of the Qinghai–Tibet Plateau. His work involved field investigations in remote frontier and coastal regions of China, contributing to the study of the country's aquatic biodiversity.

After his period of employment in Qinghai, Wu became a professor at the College of Fisheries of Ocean University of China, where he continued his academic work in fish taxonomy, morphology and fisheries research.

== Research ==
Wu's principal research interests include fish taxonomy, fish morphology and fisheries science. He is particularly known for his studies of the fish fauna of the Qinghai–Tibet Plateau, an area characterised by high-altitude freshwater ecosystems and distinctive aquatic biodiversity. His field investigations contributed to the documentation and scientific study of fish species in the plateau region. He also conducted research into marine vertebrate zoology and fisheries-related subjects.

== Selected publications ==
- Fishes of the Qinghai-Xizang Plateau (青藏高原鱼类), by Wu Yun-Fei and Wu Cuizhen. Sichuan Science and Technology Press, 1992. ISBN 9787536421684.
- Marine Vertebrate Zoology (海洋脊椎动物学), edited by Wu Yun-Fei. China Ocean University Press, 2013. ISBN 9787567003422.
