= Yang Jun-Xing =

Chinese ichthyologist

Yang Jun-Xing (Chinese: 杨君兴) is a Chinese herpetologist and ichthyologist with the Kunming Institute of Zoology. As of 2024, Yang authored 13 species of fish and amphibians.

== Publications (selection) ==
- Description of a new subspecies of the genus Saurogobio Bleeker (1870). Zoological Research (2002), 23 (4): 306–310.
- A new species of catfish of the genus Clupisoma (Siluriformes: Schilbeidae) from the Salween River, Yunnan, China. Copeia 2005: 566–570.
- Clarification of the nomenclatural status of Gymnodiptychus integrigymnatus (Cypriniformes, Cyprinidae). 2008. Zootaxa, 1897: 67–68.
- A new species of the genus Sinocyclocheilus (Teleostei: Cypriniformes), from Jinshajiang Drainage, Yunnan, China. 2015. Cave Research, 1(2): 4.
- A new river loach from the main channel of the upper Mekong in Yunnan (Cypriniformes: Nemacheilidae). 2016. Zootaxa 4168(3): 594–600.
- Paralepidocephalus translucens, a new species of loach from a cave in eastern Yunnan, China (Teleostei: Cobitidae). 2016. Ichthyological Exploration of Freshwaters, 27(1): 61–66.
- Garra incisorbis, a new species of labeonine from Pearl River basin in Guangxi, China (Teleostei: Cyprinidae). 2016. Ichthyological Exploration of Freshwaters, 26(4) [2015]: 299–303.
- A new freshwater stygobiotic calanoid (Copepoda: Speodiaptominae) from Yunnan, China. 2017. Zootaxa 4290(1): 192–200.
- A new species of the genus Kurixalus from Yunnan, China (Anura, Rhacophoridae). 2017. ZooKeys 694: 71–93.
- A new species of Kurixalus from western Yunnan, China (Anura, Rhacophoridae). 2018. Zookeys 770: 211–226.

== Taxon described by him ==
- See Category:Taxa named by Yang Jun-Xing
