= Schizopygopsis eckloni =

Conservation status
- Vulnerable (IUCN 3.1)

Scientific classification
- Kingdom: Animalia
- Phylum: Chordata
- Class: Actinopterygii
- Order: Cypriniformes
- Family: Cyprinidae
- Subfamily: Schizopygopsinae
- Genus: Schizopygopsis
- Species: S. eckloni

Binomial name
- Schizopygopsis eckloni (Herzenstein, 1891)

Synonyms
- Gymnocypris eckloni Herzenstein, 1891

Species of fish

Schizopygopsis eckloni is a species of freshwater ray-finned fish belonging to the family Cyprinidae, the family which also includes the carps, barbs, minnowns and related fishes. This fish is endemic to China where it occurs in the upper Yellow River drainage, from Qinghai to Gansu and parts of Sichuan. This species has maximum published standard length of 39.5 cm (15.6 in).

Named in honor of F. L. Ecklon, one of Nikolai Przhevalsky's assistants during his second trip to Tibet, whose services Przhevalsky said were "invaluable".
