= Schizopygopsis chui =

Conservation status
- Data Deficient (IUCN 3.1)

Scientific classification
- Kingdom: Animalia
- Phylum: Chordata
- Class: Actinopterygii
- Order: Cypriniformes
- Family: Cyprinidae
- Subfamily: Schizopygopsinae
- Genus: Schizopygopsis
- Species: S. chui

Binomial name
- Schizopygopsis chui (T. L. Tchang, T. H. Yueh & H. C. Hwang, 1964)

Synonyms
- Gymnocypris chui Tchang, Yueh & Hwang, 1964

Species of fish

Schizopygopsis chui is a species of freshwater ray-finned fish belonging to the family Cyprinidae, the family which also includes the carps, barbs, minnowns and related fishes. This species is endemic to Tibet where it is found only in four endorheic mountain lakes, Lang Tso, Gongzhu, Mafamu and Langa, in the south and west of the province. This species reaches a length of 24.5 cm (9.6 in).
