= Qinghai Lake =

Largest lake in China

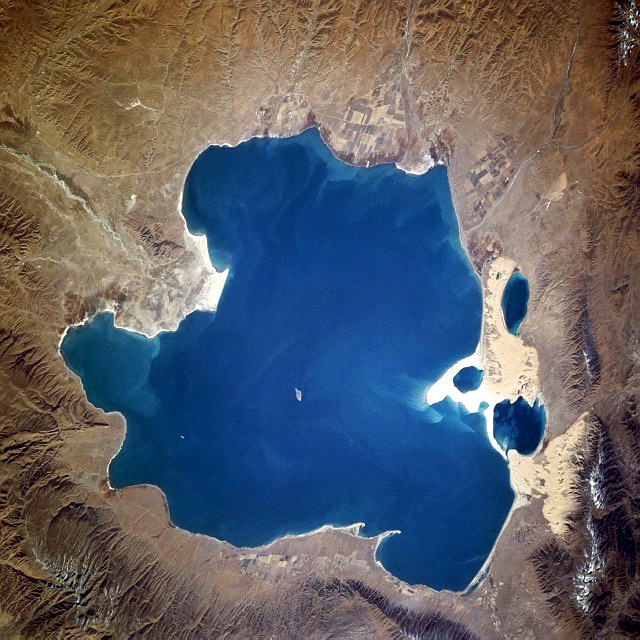
- From space (November 1994). North is to the left.

- Location within Qinghai Location within China
- Location: Qinghai
- Coordinates: 37°00′N 100°08′E
- Type: Endorheic salt lake
- Basin countries: China
- Surface area: 4,186 km^{2} (1,616 sq mi) (2004); 4,489 km^{2} (1,733 sq mi) (2007); 4,543 km^{2} (1,754 sq mi) (2020)
- Max. depth: 32.8 m (108 ft)
- Water volume: 108 km^{3} (26 cu mi)
- Surface elevation: 3,260 m (10,700 ft)
- Islands: Sand Island, Bird Islands
- Settlements: Haiyan County

Qinghai Lake is the largest lake in China. Located in the Qinghai Province, to which it gave its name, Qinghai Lake is classified as an alkaline endorheic salt lake. The lake has fluctuated in size, shrinking over much of the 20th century but increasing since 2004. It had a surface area of 4,317 km^{2} (1,667 sq mi), an average depth of 21 m (69 ft), and a maximum depth of 25.5 m (84 ft) in 2008.

== Names ==
Qinghai Lake

Chinese name
- Chinese: 靑海湖 or 青海湖
- Literal meaning: Grue Sea Lake; Blue Sea Lake
Transcriptions
Standard Mandarin
- Hanyu Pinyin: Qīnghǎi Hú
- Wade–Giles: Ch'ing-hai Hu
- IPA: [tɕʰíŋxàɪ xǔ]
Yue: Cantonese
- Jyutping: Tsing^{1}-hoi^{2} Wu^{4}

Tibetan name
- Tibetan: མཚོ་སྔོན་པོ་ མཚོ་ཁྲི་ཤོར་རྒྱལ་མོ་
Transcriptions
- Wylie: Mtsho Sngon-po; Mtsho Khri-shor Rgyal-mo

Mongolian name
- Mongolian Cyrillic: Хөх нуур
- Mongolian script
Transcriptions
- SASM/GNC: Köke naɣur

Manchu name
- Manchu script: ᡥᡠᡥᡠ ᠨᠣᠣᡵ
- Romanization: Huhu Noor

Former names

Xihai
- Chinese: 西海
- Literal meaning: Western Sea
Transcriptions
Standard Mandarin
- Hanyu Pinyin: Xī Hǎi
- Wade–Giles: Hsi Hai
Yue: Cantonese
- Jyutping: Sai^{1} Hoi^{2}

Qinghai is the atonal pinyin romanisation of the Mandarin pronunciation of the Chinese name 青海. Although modern Chinese distinguishes between the colors blue and green, this distinction did not exist in classical Chinese. The color 青 (qīng) was a "single" color inclusive of both blue and green as separate shades. The name is thus variously translated as "Blue Sea", "Green Sea", "Blue-Green Sea", "Blue/Green Sea", etc. For a time after its wars with the Xiongnu, Han China connected the lake with the legendary "Western Sea" assumed to balance the East China Sea, but as the Han Empire expanded further west into the Tarim Basin other lakes assumed the title. The former names Chinghai, Ch'ing-hai, or Ch'inghai Lake are based on the Wade–Giles romanisation of the same Chinese name.

Qinghai Lake is also known as Koko Nor from its Classical Mongolian name ᠬᠥᠬᠡ ᠨᠠᠭᠤᠷ. The modern Mongolian form of the same name is Höhnuur (Хөхнуур). Similar to Chinese, Classical Mongolian used ᠬᠥᠬᠡ inclusive of both the color of the sky and fresh grass, but now uses xöx specifically for deep or dark blue distinguished both from light blue (цэнхэр, tsenher) and green (ногоон, nogoon). Classical Mongolian also did not distinguish between lakes and larger bodies of water. The Chinese name, using "sea" rather than "lake," is thus an overly literal calque of this name, used by the Upper Mongols, some of whom made up the local ruling class during the standardization of western Chinese toponyms in the Qing dynasty. Similar use of the Chinese word for "sea" to translate Mongolian lake toponyms can be seen elsewhere around Qinghai, as with Lake Heihai ("Black Sea") in the Kunlun Mountains. It is also the origin of one of the common names for the lake in English (Kokonor Lake).

The Tibetans also separately calqued the name as Mtsho-sngon-po or Tso ngönpo (མཚོ་སྔོན་པོ་, "Blue Lake or Sea").

== Geography ==
Qinghai Lake lies about 100 kilometers (62 mi) west of Xining in a hollow of the Tibetan Plateau at 3,205 meters (10,515 ft) above sea level. It lies between Haibei Tibetan Autonomous Prefecture and Hainan Tibetan Autonomous Prefecture in northeastern Qinghai in Northwest China. The lake has fluctuated in size, shrinking over much of the 20th century but increasing since 2004. It had a surface area of 4,317 square kilometers (1,667 sq mi), an average depth of 21 meters (69 ft), and a maximum depth of 25.5 m (84 ft) in 2008.

Twenty-three rivers and streams empty into Qinghai Lake, most of them seasonal. Five permanent streams provide 80% of the total influx. The relatively low inflow and high evaporation rates have turned Qinghai saline and alkaline; the salt concentration is presently about 1.4% by weight (seawater has a salt concentration of about 3.5%), with a pH of 9.3. It has increased in salinity and basicity since the early Holocene.

At the tip of the peninsula on the western side of the lake are Cormorant Island and Egg Island, collectively known as the Bird Islands.

Qinghai Lake became isolated from the Yellow River about 150,000 years ago. If the water level were to rise by approximately 50 meters (160 ft), the connection to the Yellow River would be reestablished via the low pass to the east.

18,000 years ago, just after the end of the Last Glacial Maximum, the lake level of Lake Qinghai was around 30 metres lower than today. Between 15,600 and 10,700 years ago, lake levels secularly increased to around 10 metres lower than the present lake level, after which they declined slightly until around 9,200 years ago, when they began to rise again. Around 5,900 years ago, lake levels reached a peak of a few metres higher than today, before declining again amidst a regional cooling and drying trend until 1,400 years ago, when they were less than 10 metres lower than average modern levels. They then began to rise once more until reaching their present level.

=== Climate ===
The area around Qinghai Lake has a dry-winter subalpine climate (Köppen Dwc), typical of large areas of Tibet. Winters are frigid but extremely dry, so that the lake often remains frozen for three months continuously, whilst summers feature pleasant afternoons, generally cold mornings, and frequent showers.

Climate data for Qinghai Lake (1981−2010 normals, extremes 1981–present)
Month	Jan	Feb	Mar	Apr	May	Jun	Jul	Aug	Sep	Oct	Nov	Dec	Year
Record high °C (°F)	6.6 (43.9)	8.8 (47.8)	13.4 (56.1)	19.1 (66.4)	22.8 (73.0)	23.7 (74.7)	25.4 (77.7)	24.2 (75.6)	21.2 (70.2)	17.5 (63.5)	12.4 (54.3)	7.2 (45.0)	25.4 (77.7)
Mean daily maximum °C (°F)	−5.2 (22.6)	−2.0 (28.4)	3.2 (37.8)	7.9 (46.2)	12.1 (53.8)	14.9 (58.8)	17.1 (62.8)	17.0 (62.6)	12.6 (54.7)	7.7 (45.9)	2.2 (36.0)	−2.4 (27.7)	7.1 (44.8)
Daily mean °C (°F)	−12.3 (9.9)	−9.5 (14.9)	−4.1 (24.6)	1.3 (34.3)	6.2 (43.2)	9.4 (48.9)	11.7 (53.1)	11.3 (52.3)	7.0 (44.6)	1.8 (35.2)	−4.4 (24.1)	−8.9 (16.0)	0.8 (33.4)
Mean daily minimum °C (°F)	−17.9 (−0.2)	−15.5 (4.1)	−9.9 (14.2)	−4.3 (24.3)	0.7 (33.3)	4.4 (39.9)	6.5 (43.7)	5.9 (42.6)	2.6 (36.7)	−2.5 (27.5)	−9.0 (15.8)	−13.9 (7.0)	−4.4 (24.1)
Record low °C (°F)	−26.9 (−16.4)	−25.8 (−14.4)	−23.6 (−10.5)	−11.5 (11.3)	−9.9 (14.2)	−1.4 (29.5)	0.1 (32.2)	−0.8 (30.6)	−3.9 (25.0)	−10.9 (12.4)	−20.0 (−4.0)	−24.5 (−12.1)	−26.9 (−16.4)
Average precipitation mm (inches)	1 (0.0)	2 (0.1)	6 (0.2)	17 (0.7)	45 (1.8)	65 (2.6)	87 (3.4)	85 (3.3)	54 (2.1)	20 (0.8)	3 (0.1)	1 (0.0)	386 (15.1)
Average relative humidity (%)	48	44	46	53	61	70	73	73	72	60	47	49	58
Source 1: China Meteorological Data Service Center all-time Nov high
Source 2: www.yr.no (temperature averages)

== History ==
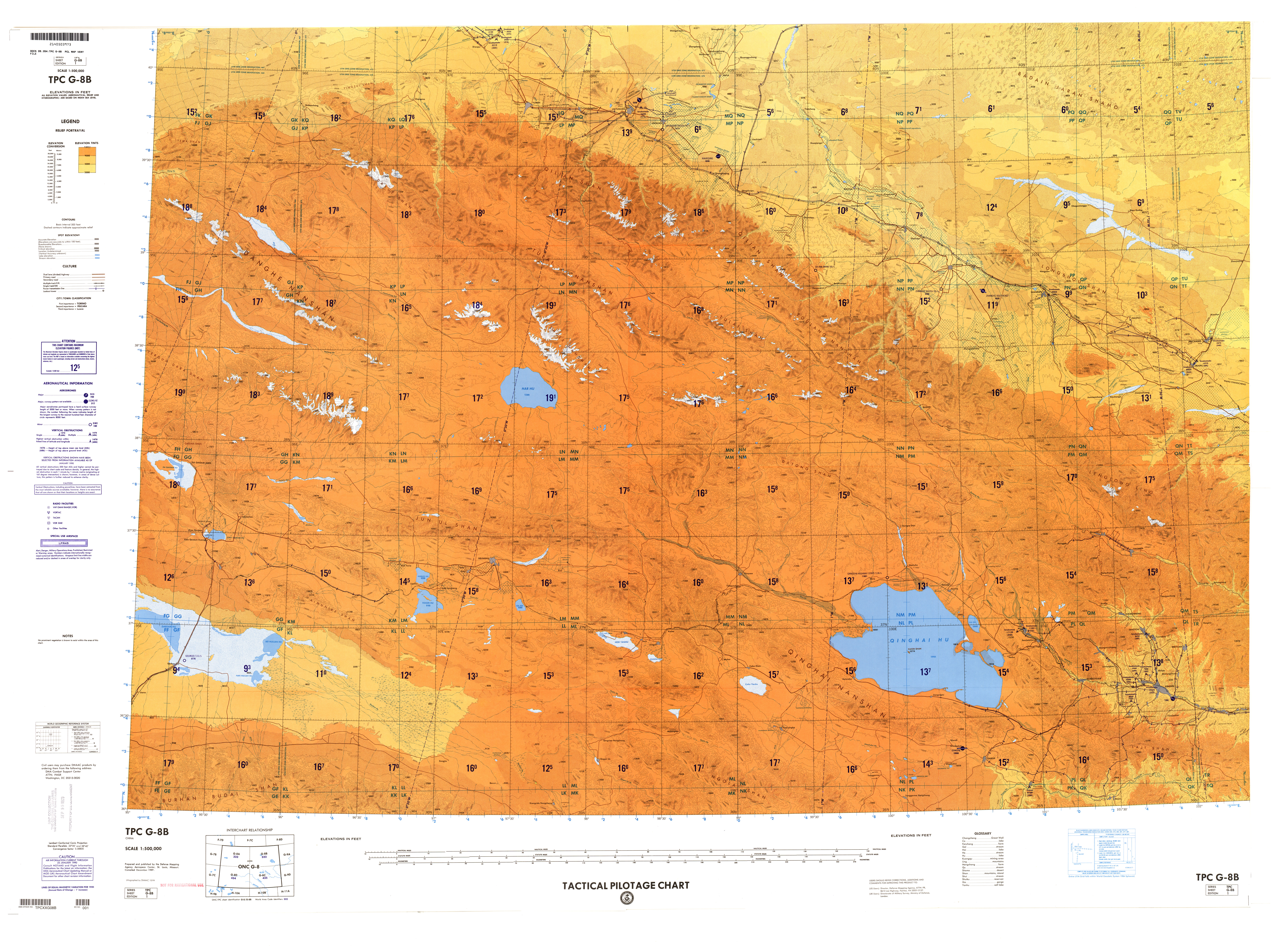
Map including Qinghai Lake

During the Han dynasty (206 BCE – 220 CE), substantial numbers of Han Chinese lived in the Xining valley to the east. In the 17th century, Mongolic-speaking Oirat and Khalkha tribals migrated to Qinghai and became known as Qinghai Mongols. In 1724, the Qinghai Mongols led by Lobzang Danjin revolted against the Qing dynasty. The Yongzheng Emperor, after putting down the rebellion, stripped away Qinghai's autonomy and imposed direct rule. Although some Tibetans lived around the lake, the Qing maintained an administrative division from the time of Güshi Khan between the Dalai Lama's western realm (slightly smaller than the current Tibet Autonomous Region) and the Tibetan-inhabited areas in the east. Yongzheng also sent Manchu and Han settlers to dilute the Mongols.

During Nationalist rule (1928–1949), the Han formed a majority of Qinghai Province's residents, although Chinese Muslims (Hui) dominated the government. The Kuomintang Hui general Ma Bufang, having invited Kazakh Muslims, joined the governor of Qinghai and other high ranking Qinghai and national government officials in conducting a joint Kokonuur Lake Ceremony to worship the God of the Lake. During the ritual, the Chinese national anthem was sung and all participants bowed to a Portrait of Kuomintang founder Sun Yat-sen as well as to the God of the Lake. Participants, both Han and Muslim, made offerings to the god.

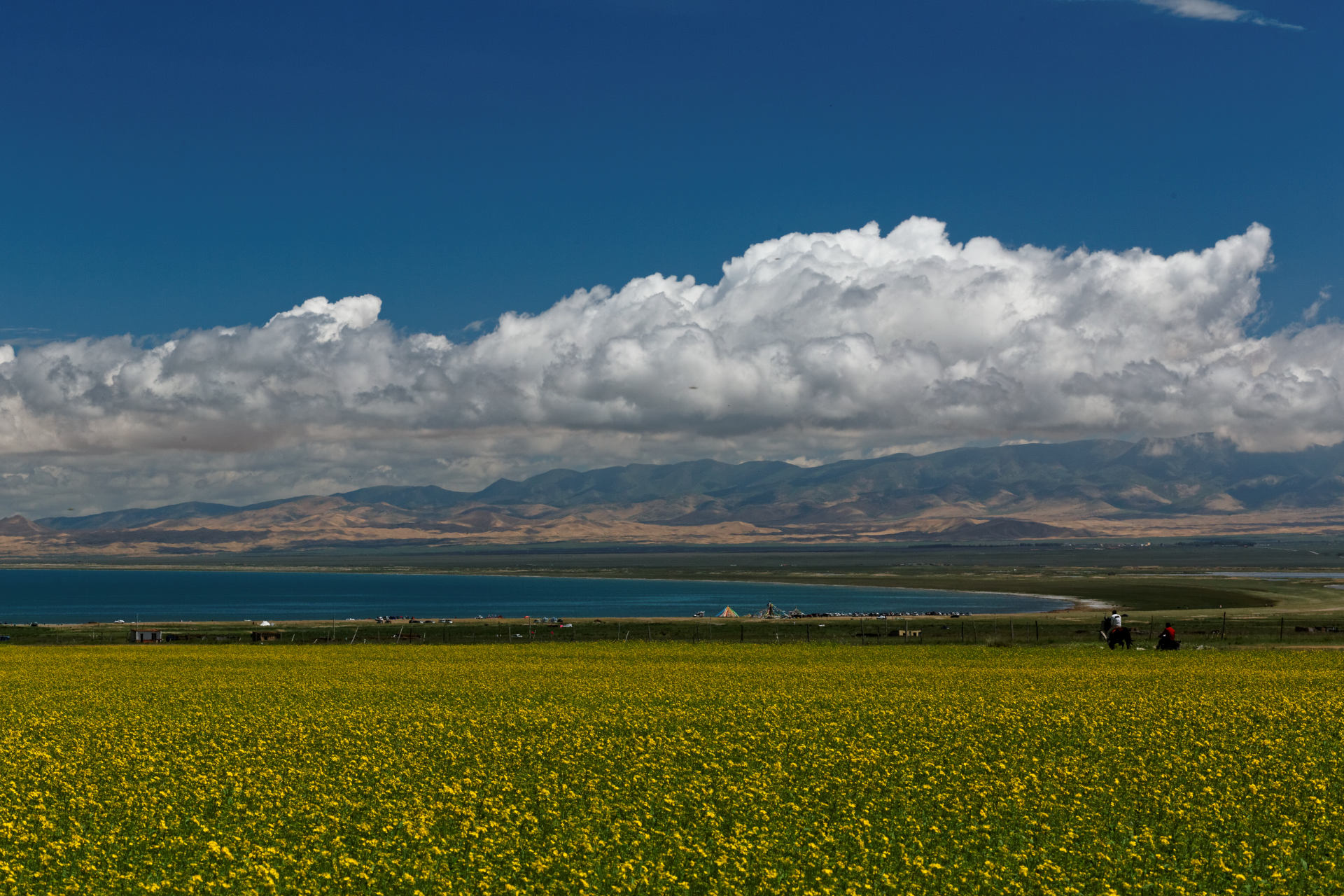
View of Qinghai Lake, 2016

After the 1949 Chinese revolution, refugees from the 1950s Anti-Rightist Movement settled in the area west of Qinghai Lake. After the reform and opening up in the 1980s, drawn by new business opportunities, migration to the area increased, causing ecological stresses. Fresh grass production in Gangcha County north of the lake declined from a mean of 2,057 kilograms per hectare (1,835 lb/acre) to 1,271 kg/ha (1,134 lb/acre) in 1987. In 2001, the State Forestry Administration of China launched the "Retire Cropland, Restore Grasslands" (退耕，还草) campaign and started confiscating Tibetan and Mongol pastoralists' guns to preserve the endangered Przewalski's gazelle.

Prior to the 1960s, 108 freshwater rivers emptied into the lake. As of 2003, 85% of the river mouths have dried up, including the lake's largest tributary, the Buha River. In between 1959 and 1982, there had been an annual water level drop of 10 centimeters (3.9 in), which was reversed at a rate of 10 cm/year (3.9 in/year) between 1983 and 1989, but has continued to drop since. The Chinese Academy of Sciences reported in 1998 the lake was again threatened with loss of surface area due to livestock over-grazing, land reclamations, and natural causes. Surface area decreased 11.7% in the period from 1908 to 2000. During that period, higher lake floor areas were exposed and numerous water bodies separated from the rest of the main lake. In the 1960s, the 48.9-square-kilometer (18.9 sq mi) Gahai Lake (尕海, Gǎhǎi) appeared in the north; Shadao Lake (沙岛, Shādǎo), covering an area of 19.6 km^{2} (7.6 sq mi) to the northeast, followed in the 1980s, along with Haiyan Lake (海晏, Hǎiyàn) of 112.5 km^{2} (43.4 sq mi). Another 96.7 km^{2} (37.3 sq mi) daughter lake split off in 2004. In addition, the lake has now split into half a dozen more small lakes at the border. Qinghai Provincial Remote Sensing Center, attributed the separation of Qinghai Lake to shrinkage of the water surface as a result of a lowered water level and desertification in the region. The water surface has shrunk by 312 km^{2} (120 sq mi) over the last three decades.

== Wildlife ==
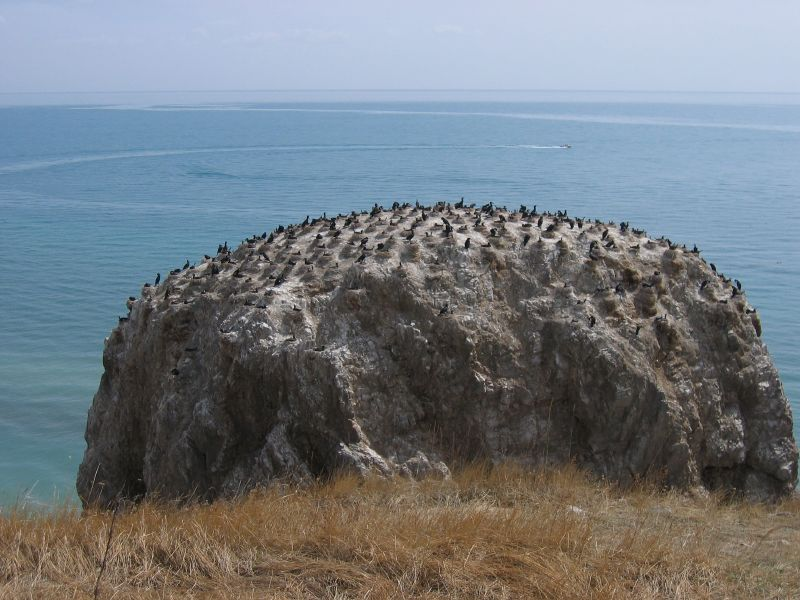
A bird island

The lake is located at the crossroads of several bird migration routes across Asia. Many species use Qinghai as an intermediate stop during migration. As such, it is a focal point in global concerns regarding avian influenza (H5N1), as a major outbreak here could spread the virus across Europe and Asia, further increasing the chances of a pandemic. Minor outbreaks of H5N1 have already been identified at the lake. The Bird Islands have been sanctuaries of the Qinghai Lake Natural Protection Zone since 1997.

There are five native fish species: The edible naked carp (Gymnocypris przewalskii, 湟鱼; huángyú), which is the most abundant in the lake, and four stoneloaches (Triplophysa stolickai, T. dorsonotata, T. scleroptera and T. siluroides). Other Yellow River fish species occurred in the lake, but they disappeared with the increasing salinity and basicity, beginning in the early Holocene.

== Culture ==
There is an island in the western part of the lake with a temple and a few hermitages called "Mahādeva, the Heart of the Lake", "mTsho snying Ma hā de wa" in Tibetan, which historically was home to a Buddhist monastery. The temple was also used for religious purposes and ceremonies. No boat was used during summer, so monks and pilgrims traveled to and from only when the lake froze over in winter. A nomad described the size of the island by saying that: "if in the morning a she-goat starts to browse the grass around it clockwise and its kid anti-clockwise, they will meet only in the night, which shows how big the island is." It is also known as the place to which Gushri Khan and other Khoshut Mongols migrated during the 1620s.

The lake is currently circumnavigated by pilgrims, mainly Tibetan Buddhists, especially every Horse Year of the 12-year cycle. Nikolay Przhevalsky estimated it would take about eight days by horse or 15 walking to circumambulate the lake, but pilgrims report it takes about 18 days on horseback, and one took 23 days walking to complete the circuit.

== In popular media ==
=== Films ===
- The Beautiful Kokonor Lake (青海湖畔, Qīnghǎi húpàn), a 2017 Chinese film directed by Shen Xinghao, starring Bai En, Irina Kaptelova, Jiang Ping, Yi Qin, Ma Su, Su Xin, Tong Rui Xin, Huang Yao.

== Gallery ==
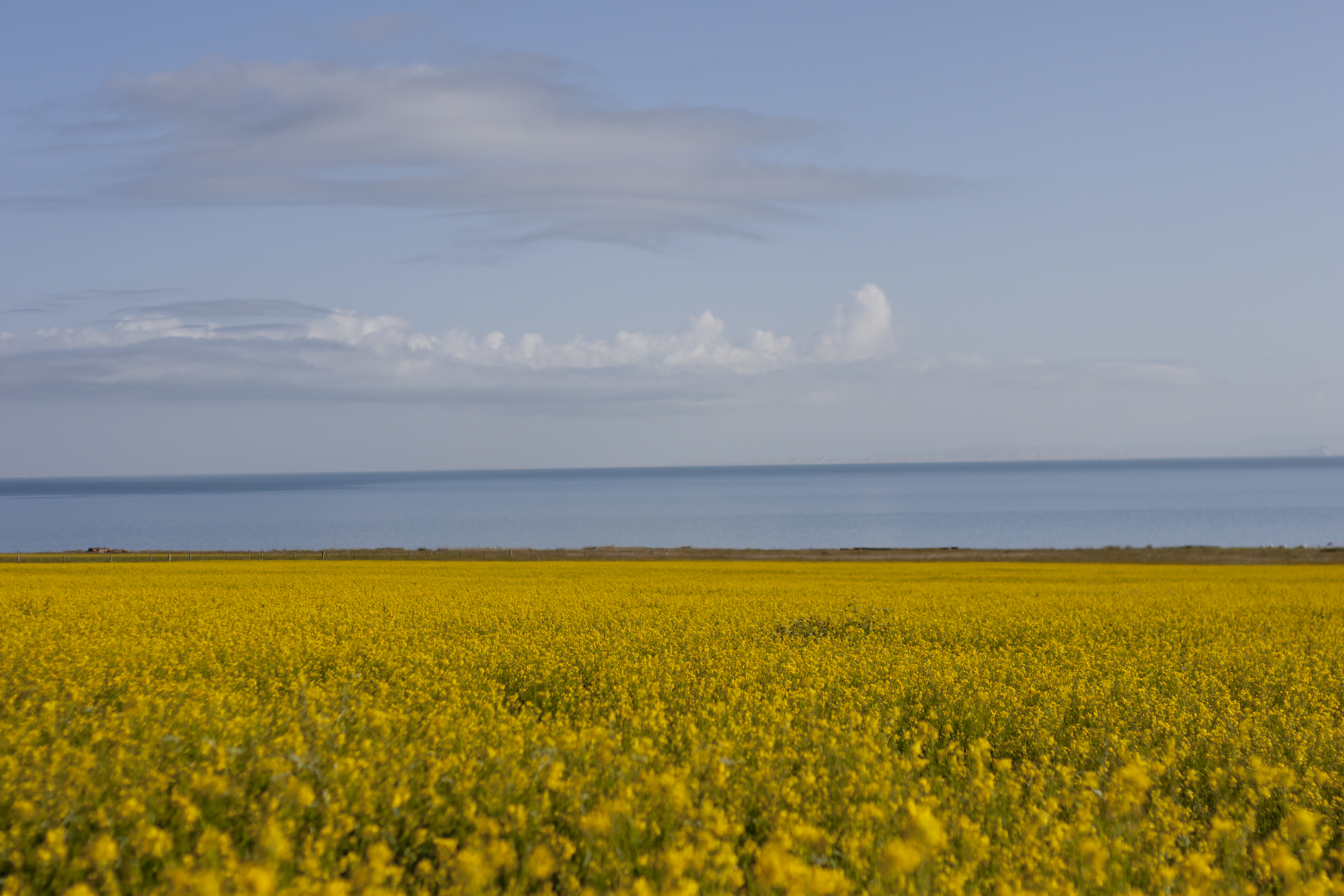
Rapeseed fields

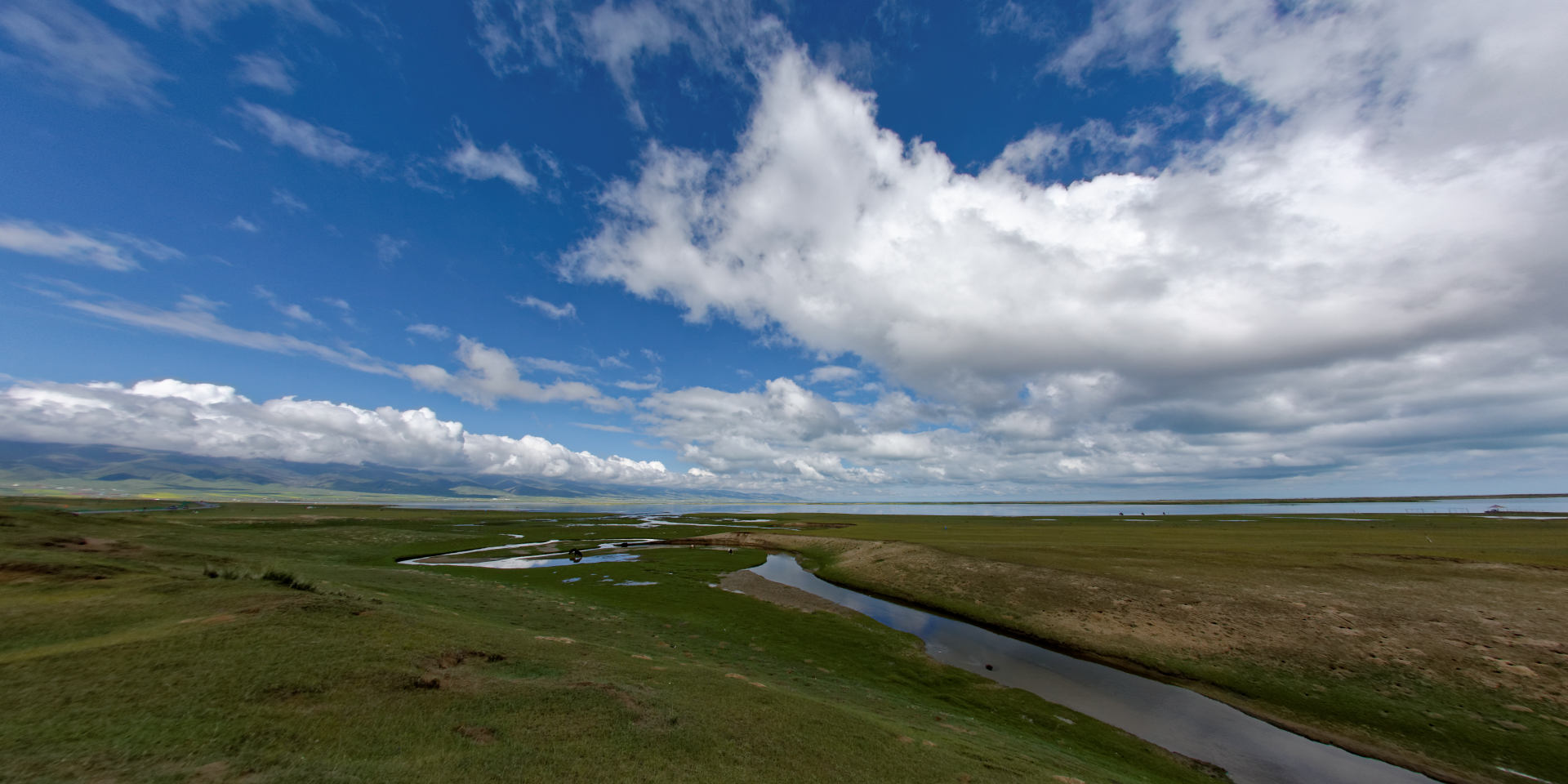
Grassland near the lake

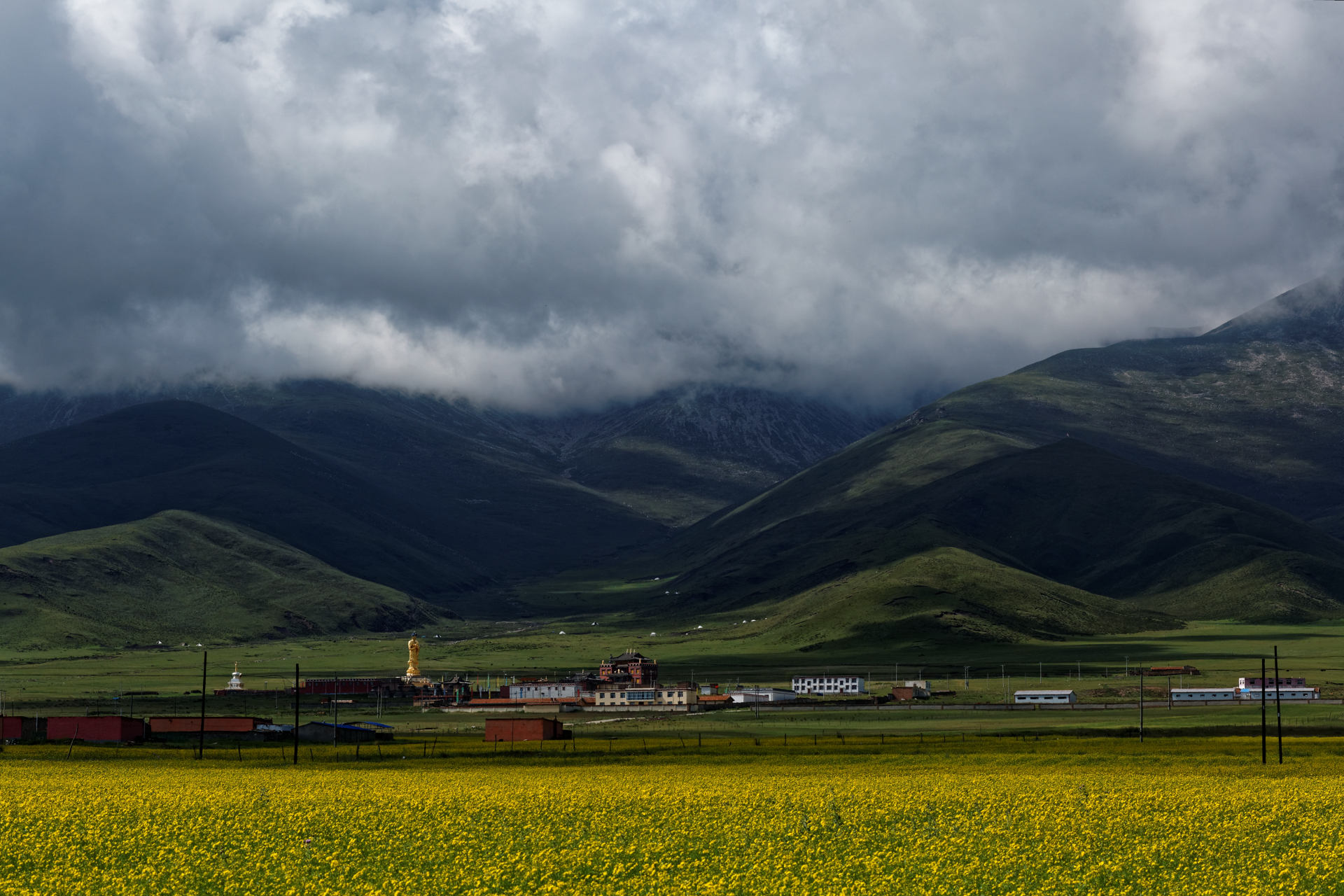
Gya'yi Monastery (རྒྱ་ཡེ་དགོན) at Qinghai Lake

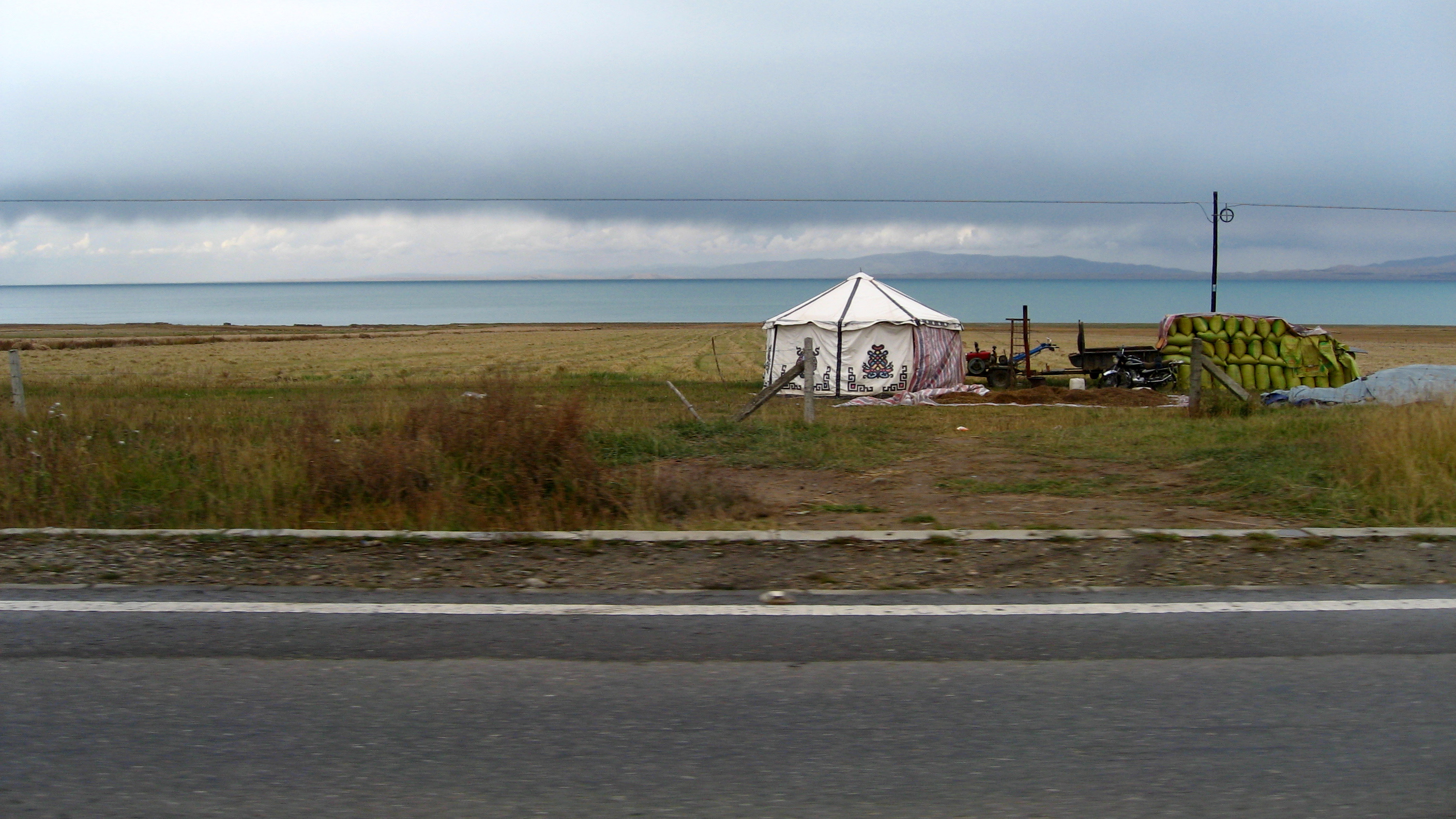
Yurt on the shore

== See also ==
- Qinghai Lake railway station
- Tour of Qinghai Lake
- North West Nuclear Weapons Research and Design Academy
- CNS Qinghaihu
