= Schizopygopsis labiosa =

Scientific classification
- Domain: Eukaryota
- Kingdom: Animalia
- Phylum: Chordata
- Class: Actinopterygii
- Order: Cypriniformes
- Family: Cyprinidae
- Genus: Schizopygopsis
- Species: S. labiosa

Binomial name
- Schizopygopsis labiosa (Herzenstein, 1891)

Synonyms
- Chaunchia labiosa Herzenstein, 1891

Species of fish

Schizopygopsis labiosa is a species of cyprinid fish that is only found in the upper reaches of the Yellow River basin in the Qinghai–Tibet Plateau of China, where it mostly inhabits slow-flowing cold waters at altitudes above 3,000 m (9,800 ft). It was regarded as the only member of the genus Chaunchia, and as a schizothoracine (snowtrout and allies). However, Eschmeyer's Catalog of Fishes classifies this species within the genus Schizopygopsis in the subfamily Schizopygopsinae.

Schizopygopsis labiosa reaches up to 25 cm (10 in) in length. Its lower jaw has a horny sheath, which it uses to scrape invertebrates and algae off the bottom. It has seriously declined because of habitat loss, overfishing and introduced species, and is now listed as vulnerable on China's Red List.
