= Schizopygopsis extrema =

Scientific classification
- Kingdom: Animalia
- Phylum: Chordata
- Class: Actinopterygii
- Order: Cypriniformes
- Family: Cyprinidae
- Genus: Schizopygopsis
- Species: S. extrema

Binomial name
- Schizopygopsis extrema (Herzenstein, 1891)

Synonyms
- Platypharodon extremus Herzenstein, 1891

Species of fish

Schizopygopsis extrema is a species of freshwater ray-finned fish belonging to the family Cyprinidae, the family which also includes the carps, barbs, minnowns and related fishes. This species is endemic to the upper Yellow River basin in the Qinghai–Tibet Plateau of China. It has been classified in the monospecific genus Platypharodon, however, Eschmeyer's Catalog of Fishes classifies this species within the genus Schizopygopsis in the subfamily Schizopygopsinae,

Schizopygopsis extrema reaches up to 60 cm (2 ft) in length and 2.5 kg (5.5 lb) in weight. Similar to Schizopygopsis, P. extremus has a horny sheath on the lower jaw and spoon-shaped teeth that it uses to scrape off periphyton and algae from stones, but it will also eat benthic invertebrates.

An important food fish, Schizopygopsis extrema has seriously declined and is now listed as vulnerable on China's Red List. The species has been bred and raised in captivity, and individuals are released back into the wild from two purposely built stations in an attempt of countering its threatened status.
