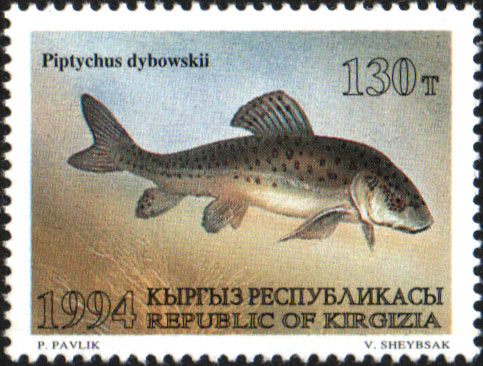
- Gymnodiptychus dybowskii

Scientific classification
- Kingdom: Animalia
- Phylum: Chordata
- Class: Actinopterygii
- Division: Teleostei
- Order: Cypriniformes
- Family: Cyprinidae
- Subfamily: Schizopygopsinae
- Genus: Gymnodiptychus; Herzenstein, 1892

Type species
- Diptychus dybowskii Kessler, 1874

= Gymnodiptychus =

Genus of fishes

Gymnodiptychus is a genus of cyprinid fish found in freshwater habitats in the highlands of China, Kyrgyzstan and Tajikistan. They reach up to 60 cm (2 ft) in total length.

== Species ==
There are currently two recognized species in this genus:

- Gymnodiptychus dybowskii (Kessler, 1874) (Naked osman)
- Gymnodiptychus pachycheilus Herzenstein, 1892

Synonyms

- Gymnodiptychus integrigymnatus T. P. Mo, 1989 is now Gaoligongia.
