= Schizopygopsis chilianensis =

Conservation status
- Least Concern (IUCN 3.1)

Scientific classification
- Kingdom: Animalia
- Phylum: Chordata
- Class: Actinopterygii
- Order: Cypriniformes
- Family: Cyprinidae
- Subfamily: Schizopygopsinae
- Genus: Schizopygopsis
- Species: S. chilianensis

Binomial name
- Schizopygopsis chilianensis (S. C. Li & S. Y. Chang, 1974)

Synonyms
- Gymnocypris chilianensis S. C. Li & S. Y. Chang, 1974

Species of fish

Schizopygopsis chilianensis is a species of freshwater ray-finned fish belonging to the family Cyprinidae, the family which also includes the carps, barbs, minnowns and related fishes. This fish is endemic to China where it occurs along the northeastern edge of the Tibetan Plateau in Gansu, Nei Mongol, and Qinghai Provinces, in the Hexi River system, occurring along the Shiyang, Ruoshui and Shule Rivers. It is found in mountain streams. This species has a maximum published standard length of 21.3 cm (8.4 in).
