= Schizopygopsis microcephala =

Scientific classification
- Kingdom: Animalia
- Phylum: Chordata
- Class: Actinopterygii
- Order: Cypriniformes
- Family: Cyprinidae
- Genus: Schizopygopsis
- Species: S. microcephala

Binomial name
- Schizopygopsis microcephala Herzenstein, 1891

Synonyms
- Herzensteinia microcephalus (Herzenstein, 1891)

Species of fish

Schizopygopsis microcephala is a species of freshwater ray-finned fish belonging to the family Cyprinidae, the family which also includes the carps, barbs, minnowns and related fishes. This species is endemic to China.
