= Gnathopogon polytaenia =

Scientific classification
- Domain: Eukaryota
- Kingdom: Animalia
- Phylum: Chordata
- Class: Actinopterygii
- Order: Cypriniformes
- Suborder: Cyprinoidei
- Family: Gobionidae
- Genus: Gnathopogon
- Species: G. polytaenia

Binomial name
- Gnathopogon polytaenia (Nichols, 1925)

Synonyms
- Leucogobio polytaenia Nichols, 1950

Species of fish

Gnathopogon polytaenia is a species of ray-finned fish in the genus Gnathopogon endemic to China.
