= Gnathopogon taeniellus =

Conservation status
- Data Deficient (IUCN 3.1)

Scientific classification
- Kingdom: Animalia
- Phylum: Chordata
- Class: Actinopterygii
- Order: Cypriniformes
- Suborder: Cyprinoidei
- Family: Gobionidae
- Genus: Gnathopogon
- Species: G. taeniellus

Binomial name
- Gnathopogon taeniellus (Nichols, 1925)

Synonyms
- Leucogobio taeniellus Nichols, 1925; Leucogobio tienmusanensis Y.-T. Chu, 1935

Species of fish

Gnathopogon taeniellus is a species of ray-finned fish in the genus Gnathopogon endemic to China.
