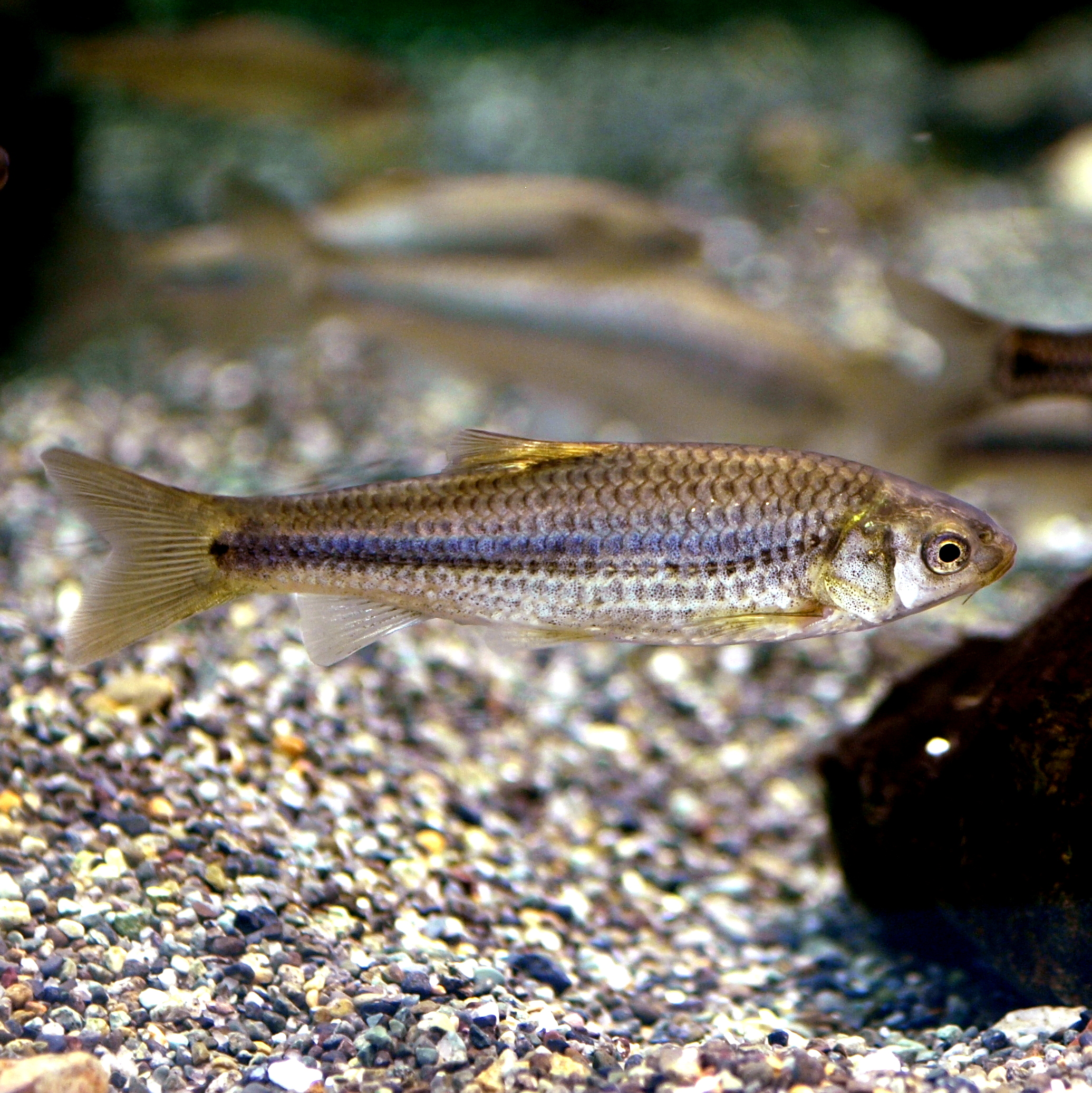
- Gnathopogon elongatus

Scientific classification
- Kingdom: Animalia
- Phylum: Chordata
- Class: Actinopterygii
- Division: Teleostei
- Order: Cypriniformes
- Family: Gobionidae
- Genus: Gnathopogon; Bleeker, 1860

Type species
- Capoeta elongata Temminck & Schlegel, 1846

Synonyms
- Leucogobio Günther, 1896; Otakia Jordan & Snyder, 1900

= Gnathopogon =

Genus of fishes

Gnathopogon is a genus of freshwater ray-finned fish belonging to the family Gobionidae, the gudgeons. The fishes in this genus are found in eastern Asia.

== Species ==
Gnathopogon has the following species.

- Gnathopogon caerulescens (Sauvage, 1883)
- Gnathopogon elongatus (Temminck & Schlegel, 1846)
- Gnathopogon herzensteini (Günther, 1896)
- Gnathopogon imberbis (Sauvage & Dabry de Thiersant, 1874)
- Gnathopogon mantschuricus (Berg, 1914)
- Gnathopogon nicholsi (P. W. Fang, 1943)
- Gnathopogon polytaenia (Nichols, 1925)
- Gnathopogon taeniellus (Nichols, 1925)
- Gnathopogon tsinanensis (T. Mori, 1928)
