= Schizopygopsis potanini =

Conservation status
- Vulnerable (IUCN 3.1)

Scientific classification
- Kingdom: Animalia
- Phylum: Chordata
- Class: Actinopterygii
- Order: Cypriniformes
- Family: Cyprinidae
- Subfamily: Schizopygopsinae
- Genus: Schizopygopsis
- Species: S. potanini

Binomial name
- Schizopygopsis potanini (Herzenstein, 1891)

Synonyms
- Gymnocypris potanini Herzenstein, 1891

Species of fish

Schizopygopsis potanini is a species of freshwater ray-finned fish belonging to the family Cyprinidae, the family which also includes the carps, barbs, minnowns and related fishes. This fish is endemic to China where it is restricted to Sichuan in the upper reaches of the Minjiang River, a tributary of the Changjiang where it inhabits cool, montaine rivers.

Named in honor of Grigory Nikolayaevich Potanin (1835-1920), Russian explorer of Inner Asia.
