= Schizopygopsis pengquensis =

Scientific classification
- Kingdom: Animalia
- Phylum: Chordata
- Class: Actinopterygii
- Order: Cypriniformes
- Family: Cyprinidae
- Subfamily: Schizopygopsinae
- Genus: Schizopygopsis
- Species: S. pengquensis

Binomial name
- Schizopygopsis pengquensis Y. T. Tang, C. G. Feng, K. Y. Wanghe, G. G. Li & K. Zhao, 2016

Synonyms.
- Gymnocypris pengquensis Y. T. Tang, C. G. Feng, K. Y. Wanghe G. G. Li & K. Zhae, 2016

Species of fish

Schizopygopsis pengquensis is a species of freshwater ray-finned fish belonging to the family Cyprinidae, the family which also includes the carps, barbs, minnowns and related fishes. This species is restricted to the Pengqu River in Tibet.
