= Schizopygopsis thermalis =

Conservation status
- Data Deficient (IUCN 3.1)

Scientific classification
- Domain: Eukaryota
- Kingdom: Animalia
- Phylum: Chordata
- Class: Actinopterygii
- Order: Cypriniformes
- Family: Cyprinidae
- Genus: Schizopygopsis
- Species: S. thermalis

Binomial name
- Schizopygopsis thermalis Herzenstein, 1891

Species of fish

Schizopygopsis thermalis is a species of ray-finned fish endemic to China. It occurs in the upper Salween River drainage in Tibet. Little is known about its ecology, apart from it being recorded from rivers.

Schizopygopsis thermalis grows to 27.4 cm (10.8 in) SL.
