= Schizopygopsis kessleri =

Scientific classification
- Kingdom: Animalia
- Phylum: Chordata
- Class: Actinopterygii
- Order: Cypriniformes
- Family: Cyprinidae
- Genus: Schizopygopsis
- Species: S. kessleri

Binomial name
- Schizopygopsis kessleri Herzenstein, 1891

Species of fish

Schizopygopsis kessleri is a species of freshwater ray-finned fish belonging to the family Cyprinidae, the family which also includes the carps, barbs, minnowns and related fishes. This fish is endemic to China.

== Etymology ==
Named in memory of Russian ichthyologist Karl Federovich Kessler (1815-1881).
