= Gymnodiptychus pachycheilus =

Conservation status
- Least Concern (IUCN 3.1)

Scientific classification
- Kingdom: Animalia
- Phylum: Chordata
- Class: Actinopterygii
- Division: Teleostei
- Order: Cypriniformes
- Family: Cyprinidae
- Genus: Gymnodiptychus
- Species: G. pachycheilus

Binomial name
- Gymnodiptychus pachycheilus Herzenstein, 1892

Species of fish

Gymnodiptychus pachycheilus is a species of cyprinid in the genus Gymnodiptychus. It inhabits the Yellow and Yangtze rivers of China and has a maximum length of 60 cm (24 in). It is considered harmless to humans.
