= Schizopygopsis waddellii =

Conservation status
- Least Concern (IUCN 3.1)

Scientific classification
- Kingdom: Animalia
- Phylum: Chordata
- Class: Actinopterygii
- Order: Cypriniformes
- Family: Cyprinidae
- Subfamily: Schizopygopsinae
- Genus: Schizopygopsis
- Species: S. waddellii

Binomial name
- Schizopygopsis waddellii (Regan, 1905)

Synonyms
- Gymnocypris gibberis; Gymnocypris hobsonii; Gymnocypris molicorporus; Gymnocypris pingi; Rugogymnocypris tibetanus; Gymnocypris waddellii

Species of fish

Schizopygopsis waddellii is a species of cyprinid fish endemic to Tibet.

Named in honor of Lieut.-Col. Laurence Austine Waddell, CB (1854-1938), British army surgeon, explorer, philologist, linguist, and chemistry and pathology professor, who preserved the type specimens in salt before presenting them to the British Museum (Natural History).
