= Schizopygopsis namensis =

Conservation status
- Least Concern (IUCN 3.1)

Scientific classification
- Kingdom: Animalia
- Phylum: Chordata
- Class: Actinopterygii
- Order: Cypriniformes
- Family: Cyprinidae
- Subfamily: Schizopygopsinae
- Genus: Schizopygopsis
- Species: S. namensis

Binomial name
- Schizopygopsis namensis (Wu & Ren, 1982)

Synonyms
- Schizopygopsis microcephalus namensis Wu & Ren, 1982

Species of fish

Schizopygopsis namensis is a species of freshwater ray-finned fish belonging to the family Cyprinidae, the family which also includes the carps, barbs, minnowns and related fishes. This fish is endemic to China where it is restricted to the Namtso Lake and the streams draining into it, in Tibet. This species has a maximum published standard length of 49.1 cm (19.3 in).
