= Schizopygopsis pylzovi =

Conservation status
- Least Concern (IUCN 3.1)

Scientific classification
- Kingdom: Animalia
- Phylum: Chordata
- Class: Actinopterygii
- Order: Cypriniformes
- Family: Cyprinidae
- Genus: Schizopygopsis
- Species: S. pylzovi

Binomial name
- Schizopygopsis pylzovi Kessler, 1876

Synonyms
- Schizopygopsis guentheri Herzenstein, 1891; Schizopygopsis koslowi Herzenstein, 1891

Species of fish

Schizopygopsis pylzovi is a species of river-dwelling ray-finned fish belonging to the family Cyprinidae, the family which also includes the carps, barbs, minnowns and related fishes. It is endemic to the Qinghai–Tibetan Plateau, China. It grows to 30 cm (12 in) body length.
