= Schizopygopsis malacanthus =

Conservation status
- Least Concern (IUCN 3.1)

Scientific classification
- Kingdom: Animalia
- Phylum: Chordata
- Class: Actinopterygii
- Division: Teleostei
- Order: Cypriniformes
- Family: Cyprinidae
- Genus: Schizopygopsis
- Species: S. malacanthus

Binomial name
- Schizopygopsis malacanthus Herzenstein, 1891

Species of fish

Schizopygopsis malacanthus is a species of freshwater ray-finned fish belonging to the family Cyprinidae, the family which also includes the carps, barbs, minnows and related fishes. This species is endemic to China where it occurs in the upper Jinsha Jiang and Yalong Jiang basin in Qinghai, Sichuan, part of Tibet, and Yunnan. It grows to 20.4 cm (8.0 in) SL.
