= Gnathopogon herzensteini =

Scientific classification
- Domain: Eukaryota
- Kingdom: Animalia
- Phylum: Chordata
- Class: Actinopterygii
- Order: Cypriniformes
- Suborder: Cyprinoidei
- Family: Gobionidae
- Genus: Gnathopogon
- Species: G. herzensteini

Binomial name
- Gnathopogon herzensteini (Günther, 1896)

Synonyms
- Leucogobio herzensteini Günther, 1896

Species of fish

Gnathopogon herzensteini is a species of ray-finned fish in the genus Gnathopogon endemic to China.

Although patronym not identified but clearly in honor of Russian ichthyologist Solomon Markovich Herzenstein (1854-1894), who named an Acanthogobio after Günther in 1892.
