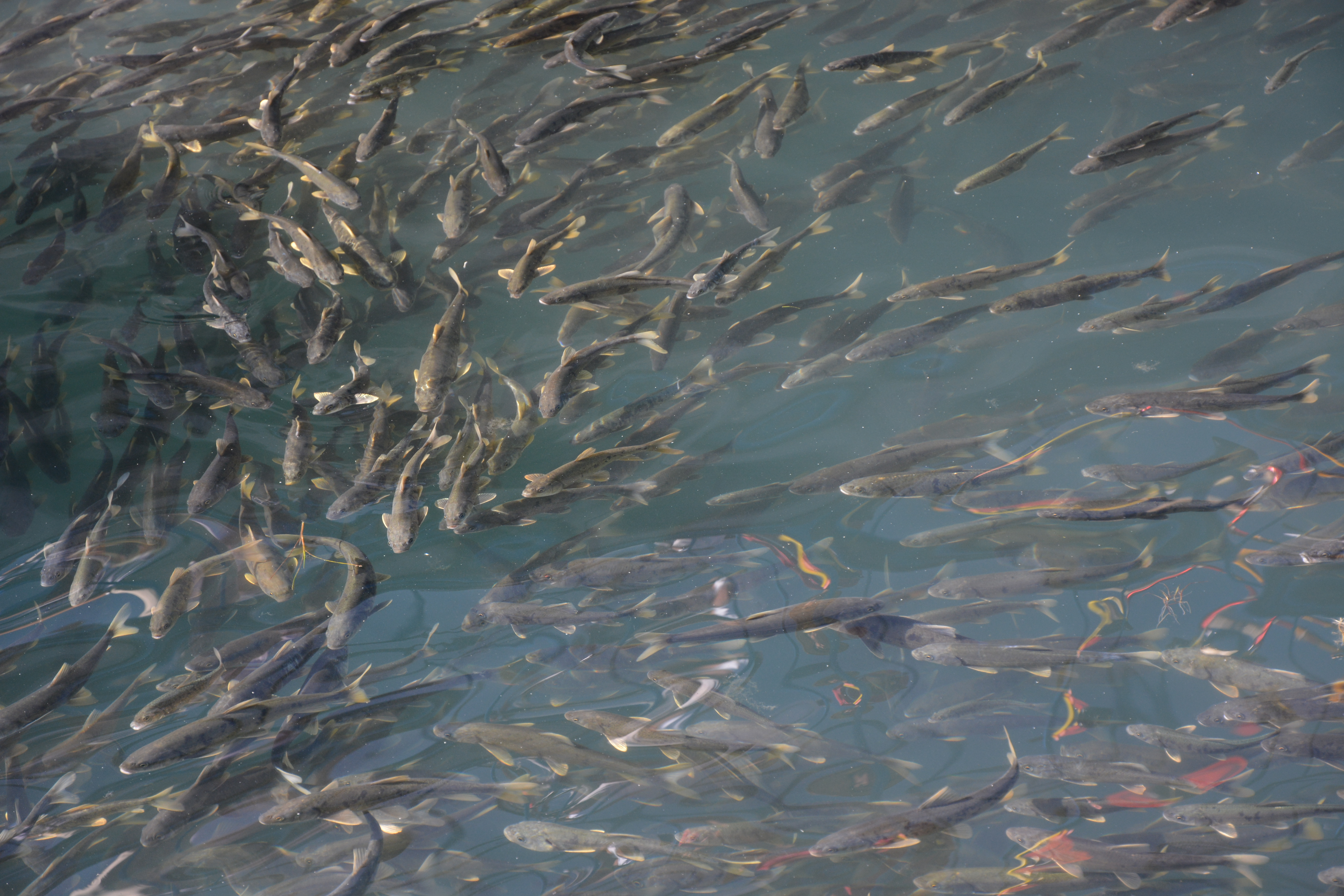

Conservation status
- Near Threatened (IUCN 3.1)

Scientific classification
- Kingdom: Animalia
- Phylum: Chordata
- Class: Actinopterygii
- Division: Teleostei
- Order: Cypriniformes
- Family: Cyprinidae
- Subfamily: Schizopygopsinae
- Genus: Schizopygopsis
- Species: S. przewalskii

Binomial name
- Schizopygopsis przewalskii Kessler, 1876

Synonyms
- Gymnocypris przewalskii (Kessler, 1876)

= Schizopygopsis przewalskii =

Species of fish

Gymnocypris przewalskii (also known by previous scientific name of Schizopygopsis przewalskii; common name: Przewalskii's naked carp; also known as scaleless carp; in Chinese: 青海湖裸鲤; lit. 'Qinghai Lake naked carp') is a species of cyprinid that is endemic to the Lake Qinghai basin in China, where it is the dominant fish species (the other natives are four Triplophysa loaches). G. przewalskii is a planktivore with a main population that migrates from the lake to rivers to spawn and another that lives its entire life in the nearby Ganzi River, Gymnocypris przewalskii ganzihonensis. The species is listed as endangered on the China Species Red List due to overfishing and habitat loss, which has led to suspension of its commercial fishery four times since 1989.

== Characteristics ==
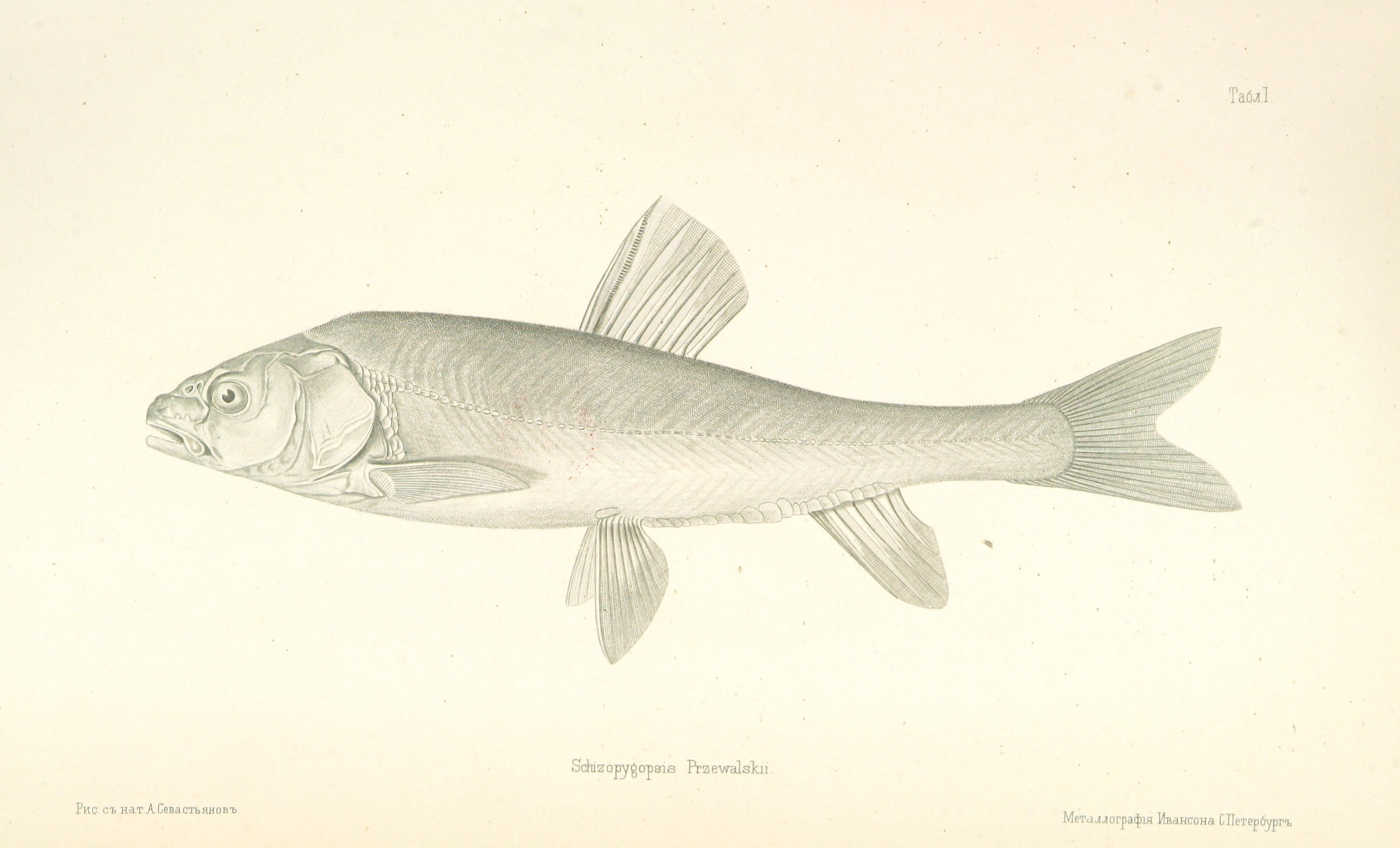
A drawing of Gymnocypris przewalskii under the former name Schizopygopsis przewalskii

Naked carp reach a maximum length of 48 cm (1.57 ft) and are typically 300–500 g (0.66–1.10 lb) at reproductive age. They have long, flat bodies and almost no scales except specialized ones embedded in the dermis near the anus and shoulder girdle, which gives them their common name, "naked carp". They grow relatively slowly and may take 7–10 years to reach reproductive size.

=== Feeding ===
They feed mostly on benthic zooplankton about 2 m (6.6 ft) below the surface, though they also feed on other aquatic invertebrates.

== Etymology ==
Gymnocypris przewalskii is named in honor of naturalist General Nikolai Mikhailovitch Przhevalsky (also spelled Przewalski and Prjevalsky, 1839–1888), who collected the type species. The name was given by Karl Fedorovich Kessler, a 19th century Russian ichthyologist who processed a volume of Przhevalsky’s travelogue of Mongolia that includes Kessler’s description of the naked carp.

The origins of the common name comes from Greek, in which gymnos = naked, and kyprinos = carp.

== Distribution ==
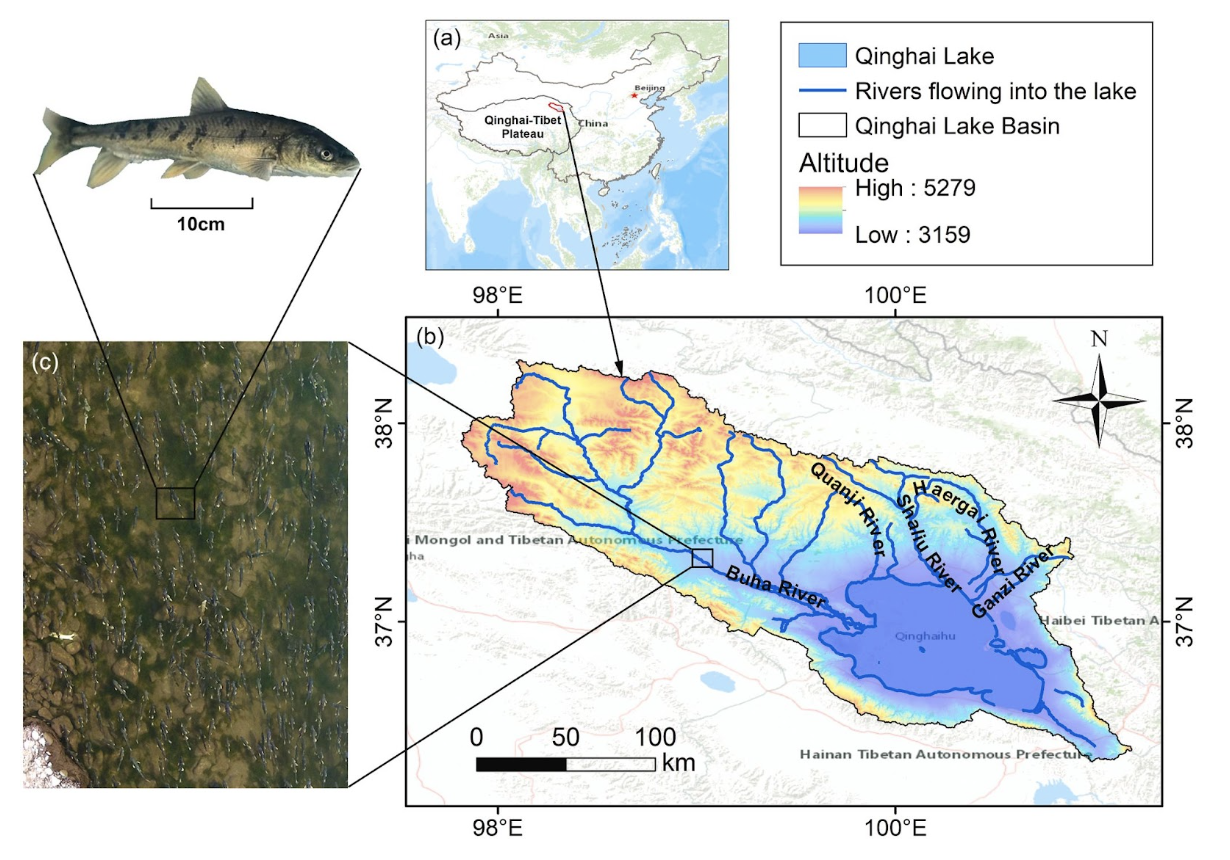
Range map showing the Qinghai Lake’s location in China (a), the altitude and rivers of the Plateau (b), and an aerial photo depicting the naked carp (c)

G. przewalskii is solely found in China—specifically it is endemic to Qinghai Lake and its tributaries in the northeastern region of the Tibetan Plateau. This is the largest endorheic saline lake in China; essentially, the lake retains water and does not outflow to other bodies of water. It is anadromous, living in freshwater and saltwater and returning to freshwater to spawn, with a migration cycle further outlined in detail in the following Reproduction and Migration section. Spatially, the naked carp is benthopelagic, found between bottom and midwater zones and in slow currents.

=== Reproduction and migration ===
The Qinghai Lake has a salinity of about 14 parts per thousand, meaning that the water is brackish. From April to July adults of the lake population migrate 40–50 km (25–31 mi) to nearby freshwater streams to spawn. Currently, the naked carp primarily uses only five freshwater rivers, the Haergai, Shaliu, Heima, Quanji, and Buha rivers. Much like salmon, they seek sandy gravel banks with slower currents to build nests. G. przewalskii shows a preference for pebble substrate during reproduction and sand substrate during pre and post spawning. When fish return to the lake, their electrolyte levels increase quickly to concentrations similar to Lake Qinghai's salinity, while urine flow, metabolic rate, and oxygen consumption all decrease drastically. This is thought to represent the reduced osmoregulatory and metabolic costs of living in Lake Qinghai which make returning after spawning and reproduction advantageous. Young fish are thought to return to the lake after overwintering in their spawning streams.

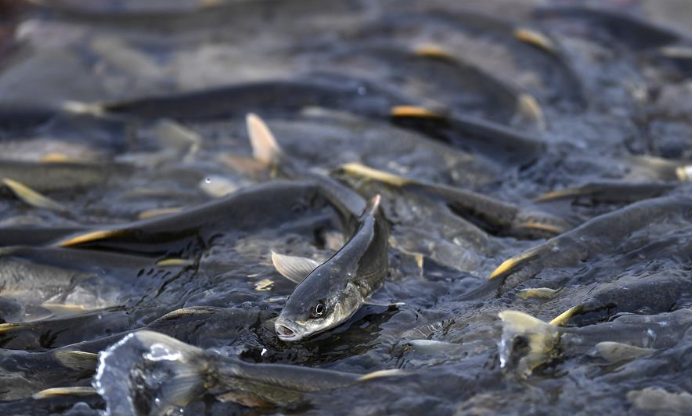
Przewalskii’s naked carp photographed during migration in July 2019.

The other population spends its entire life in the nearby Ganzi River and is variously recognized as a separate ecotype or subspecies (S. p. ganzihonensis). Although likely connected to Lake Qinghai in historical times, the low water levels have separated them, effectively isolating the subspecies in this river. The two populations differ in shape and number of gill rakers.

== Genomics ==
There is a large volume of scientific literature on G. przewalskii due to their previously mentioned migration patterns from brackish to freshwater and abilities of osmoregulation. There is a large interest in these abilities for genomics research and application to the ability of species adaptation to climate change. Research data showed that within 12 hours after transfer, the cost of living for naked carp is almost 40% lower in brackish lake water than fresh river water; for clarity, the cost of living refers to the energy expenditure of the carp which is measured with variables such as oxygen consumption. Studies of transcriptomes of genes of the naked carp can help with understanding adaptation and ecological speciation, as these genes are involved with ion channel functions, immune responses, or cellular water absorption functions. This information may be able to be applied to a wider context of shifting from saltwater to freshwater living.

== Conservation status ==
There is varying information on whether the species is endangered or threatened. G. przewalskii is near threatened on the IUCN Red List as of 2024; however, it is an endangered species on the China Red Data Book of Endangered Animals. The lake’s water level has declined by about 10–12 cm yr^{−1} over the past 50 years, increasing the salinity of the lake. Qinghai Lake faces anthropogenic influence from river water use for agriculture and climate change. Damming and irrigation have decreased spawning ground area for the naked carp. Scientists have previously attempted to create stepped fishways on the Shaliu, Quanjie, and Haergai Rivers between 2006 and 2015. Newer studies suggest that fish passages may be more suited to the naked carp’s maximum swimming speed since they have been observed to cluster under stepped fishways when they cannot swim fast enough to go upstream.

G. przewalskii is the only commercial fish in Qinghai Lake. Limits have been placed on the fisheries, as the population decreased from 320,000 tons before the 1950s to only 3000 tons by the early 2000s.
