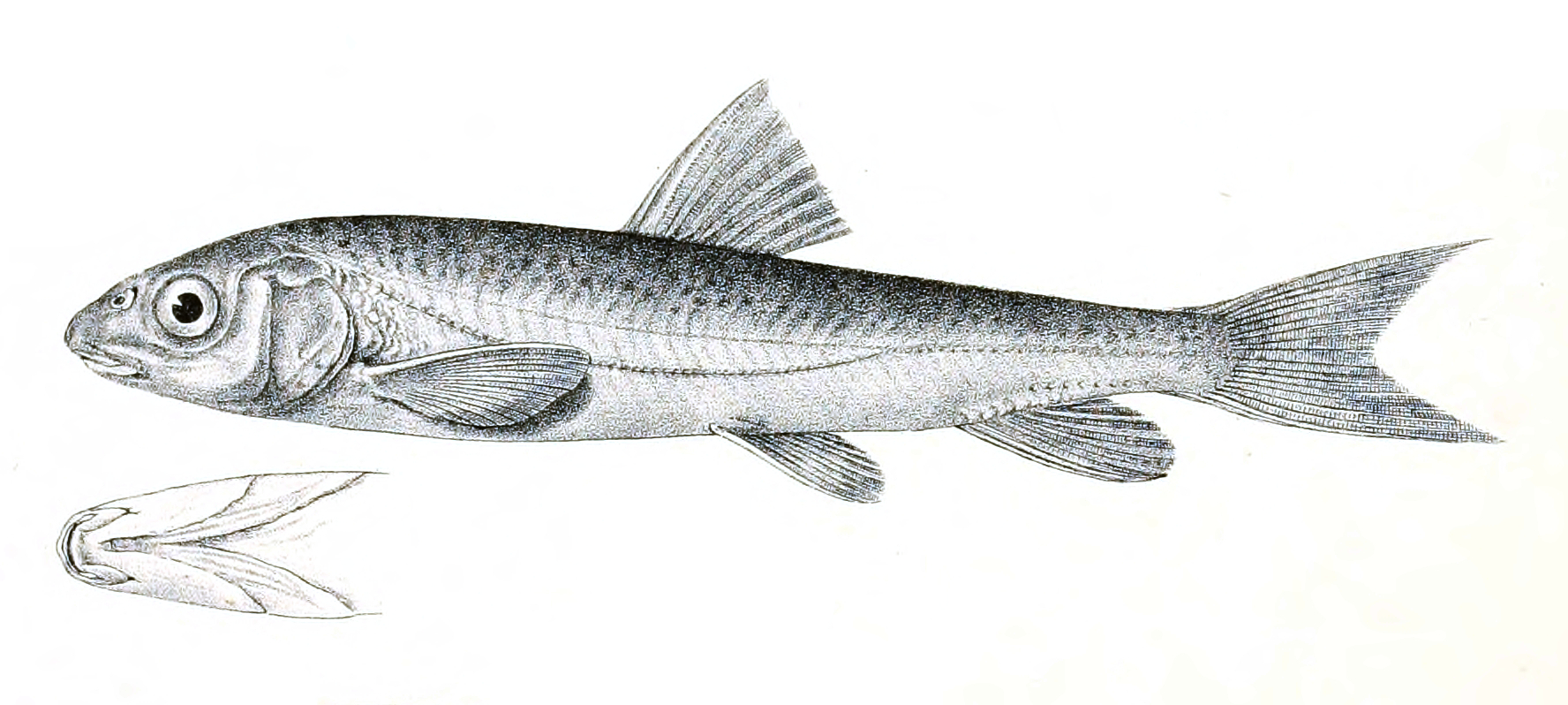
- Schizopygopsis stoliczkai

Scientific classification
- Kingdom: Animalia
- Phylum: Chordata
- Class: Actinopterygii
- Division: Teleostei
- Order: Cypriniformes
- Family: Cyprinidae
- Subfamily: Schizopygopsinae
- Genus: Schizopygopsis; Steindachner, 1866

Type species
- Schizopygopsis stoliczkai Steindachner, 1866

Species
- See text.

Synonyms
- Chuanchia Herzenstein, 1891; Gymnocypris Günther, 1868; Herzensteinia Y. T. Chu, 1935; Platypharodon Herzenstein, 1891; Rugogymnocypris T.-H. Yueh & H.-C. Hwang, 1964

= Schizopygopsis =

Genus of fishes

Schizopygopsis is a genus of cyprinid fish. Most species are endemic to river basins in the Himalayas and Qinghai–Tibet Plateau of China, but S. stoliczkai extends into the highlands of Afghanistan, Iran, northern India, Kyrgyzstan, Pakistan and Tajikistan.

S. younghusbandi is up to almost 50 cm (1.6 ft) in total length, but the remaining species generally only reach about two-thirds of that size. Schizopygopsis have a horny sheath on the lower jaw and spoon-shaped teeth that they use to scrape off periphyton and algae from stones, but they will also eat benthic invertebrates.

Schizopygopsis has been classified as a part of the schizothoracines (snowtrout and allies), however, Eschmeyer's Catalog of Fishes classifies this genus in the subfamily Schizopygopsinae.

== Species ==
These are the currently recognized species in this genus:

- Schizopygopsis anteroventris (Y. F. Wu & C. Z. Wu, 1989)
- Schizopygopsis bangongensis (Y. F. Wu & C. Q. Zhu, 1979)
- Schizopygopsis chengi (P. W. Fang, 1936)
- Schizopygopsis chilianensis (S. C. Li & S. Y. Chang, 1974)
- Schizopygopsis chui (T. L. Tchang, T. H. Yueh & H. C. Hwang, 1964)
- Schizopygopsis dobula (A. Günther, 1868)
- Schizopygopsis eckloni (S. Herzenstein, 1891)
- Schizopygopsis extrema (S. Herzenstein, 1891)
- Schizopygopsis firmispinata (Y. F. Wu &C. Z. Wu, 1988)
- Schizopygopsis himalayensis (W. X. Tsao, 1974)
- Schizopygopsis kessleri (S. Herzenstein, 1891)
- Schizopygopsis kialingensis (W. X. Tsao & C. L. Tun, 1962)
- Schizopygopsis labiosa (S. Herzenstein, 1891)
- Schizopygopsis longimandibularis (Tsao, Chen, Wu & Zhu, 1992)
- Schizopygopsis malacanthus (S. Herzenstein, 1891)
- Schizopygopsis maphamyumensis (Y. F. Wu & C. Q. Zhu, 1979)
- Schizopygopsis microcephala (S. Herzenstein, 1891)
- Schizopygopsis namensis (Y. F. Wu & M. L. Ren, 1982)
- Schizopygopsis pengquensis (Y. T. Tang, C. G. Feng, K. Y. Wanghe, G. G. Li & K. Zhao, 2016)
- Schizopygopsis potanini (S. Herzenstein, 1891)
- Schizopygopsis przewalskii (K. Kessler, 1876)
- Schizopygopsis pylzovi (K. Kessler, 1876)
- Schizopygopsis scleracanthus (Tsao, Wu, Chen & Zhu, 1992)
- Schizopygopsis selincuoensis (Y. F. Chen & W. X. Cao, 2000) (Selincuo naked carp)
- Schizopygopsis sewerzowi Herzenstein, 1891
- Schizopygopsis stoliczkai (Steindachner, 1866) (False osman)
- Schizopygopsis thermalis (S. Herzenstein, 1891)
- Schizopygopsis waddellii (C. T. Regan, 1905)
- Schizopygopsis yalongensis (Zhao K, Liu S, Chen S, Tian F, 2026)
- Schizopygopsis younghusbandi (C. T. Regan, 1905)
