= Schizopygopsis scleracanthus =

Conservation status
- Vulnerable (IUCN 3.1)

Scientific classification
- Kingdom: Animalia
- Phylum: Chordata
- Class: Actinopterygii
- Order: Cypriniformes
- Family: Cyprinidae
- Subfamily: Schizopygopsinae
- Genus: Schizopygopsis
- Species: S. scleracanthus

Binomial name
- Schizopygopsis scleracanthus (Tsao, Wu, Chen & Zhu, 1992)

Synonyms
- Gymnocypris scleracanthus Tsao, Wu, Chen & Zhu, 1992

Species of fish

Schizopygopsis scleracanthus is a species of freshwater ray-finned fish belonging to the family Cyprinidae, the family which also includes the carps, barbs, minnowns and related fishes. This fish is endemic to China where it is known to occur only in the Langcuo Lake in Tibet.
