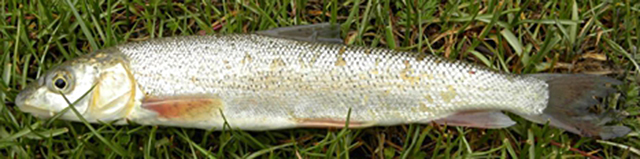
- Ptychobarbus dipogon

Scientific classification
- Domain: Eukaryota
- Kingdom: Animalia
- Phylum: Chordata
- Class: Actinopterygii
- Order: Cypriniformes
- Family: Cyprinidae
- Subfamily: Schizopygopsinae
- Genus: Ptychobarbus; Steindachner, 1866

Type species
- Ptychobarbus conirostris Steindachner, 1866

= Ptychobarbus =

Genus of fishes

Ptychobarbus is a genus of cyprinid fish that is found in rivers, streams and lakes in the Himalayas and Tibetan Plateau of China, India, Nepal and Pakistan, extending into the highlands of Afghanistan. They reach up to 2.2 kg (5 lb) in weight and about 65 cm (2.1 ft) in total length. They mostly feed on benthic invertebrates, but will also take planktonic organisms, aquatic plants and algae.

Ptychobarbus has been a part of the schizothoracines (snowtrout and allies), however, Eschmeyer's Catalog of Fishes classifies this genus in the subfamily Schizopygopsinae.

== Species ==
Pytochobarbus contains the following species:

- Ptychobarbus chungtienensis (W. H. Tsao, 1964) (Heavy lips fish)
- Ptychobarbus conirostris Steindachner, 1866 (Indus snowtrout)
- Ptychobarbus dipogon (Regan, 1905)
- Ptychobarbus kaznakovi A. M. Nikolskii, 1903
- Ptychobarbus leptosomus C. G. Zhang, Y. H. Zhao & C. Y. Niu, 2019
