= Gnathopogon tsinanensis =

Conservation status
- Data Deficient (IUCN 3.1)

Scientific classification
- Kingdom: Animalia
- Phylum: Chordata
- Class: Actinopterygii
- Order: Cypriniformes
- Suborder: Cyprinoidei
- Family: Gobionidae
- Genus: Gnathopogon
- Species: G. tsinanensis

Binomial name
- Gnathopogon tsinanensis (Mori, 1928)

Synonyms
- Gnathopogon imberbis tsinanensis; Leucogobio polytaenia microbarbus; Leucogobio polytaenia tsinanensis; Leucogobio tsinanensis

Species of fish

Gnathopogon tsinanensis is a species of ray-finned fish in the genus Gnathopogon endemic to China.
