= Schizopygopsis anteroventris =

Conservation status
- Data Deficient (IUCN 3.1)

Scientific classification
- Domain: Eukaryota
- Kingdom: Animalia
- Phylum: Chordata
- Class: Actinopterygii
- Order: Cypriniformes
- Family: Cyprinidae
- Genus: Schizopygopsis
- Species: S. anteroventris

Binomial name
- Schizopygopsis anteroventris Wu & Tsao, 1989

Species of fish

Schizopygopsis anteroventris is a species of ray-finned fish endemic to China. It occurs in the upper Mekong and Salween River drainages in Tibet. Little is known about its ecology, apart from it being recorded from rivers.

Schizopygopsis anteroventris grows to 30.5 cm (12.0 in) SL.
