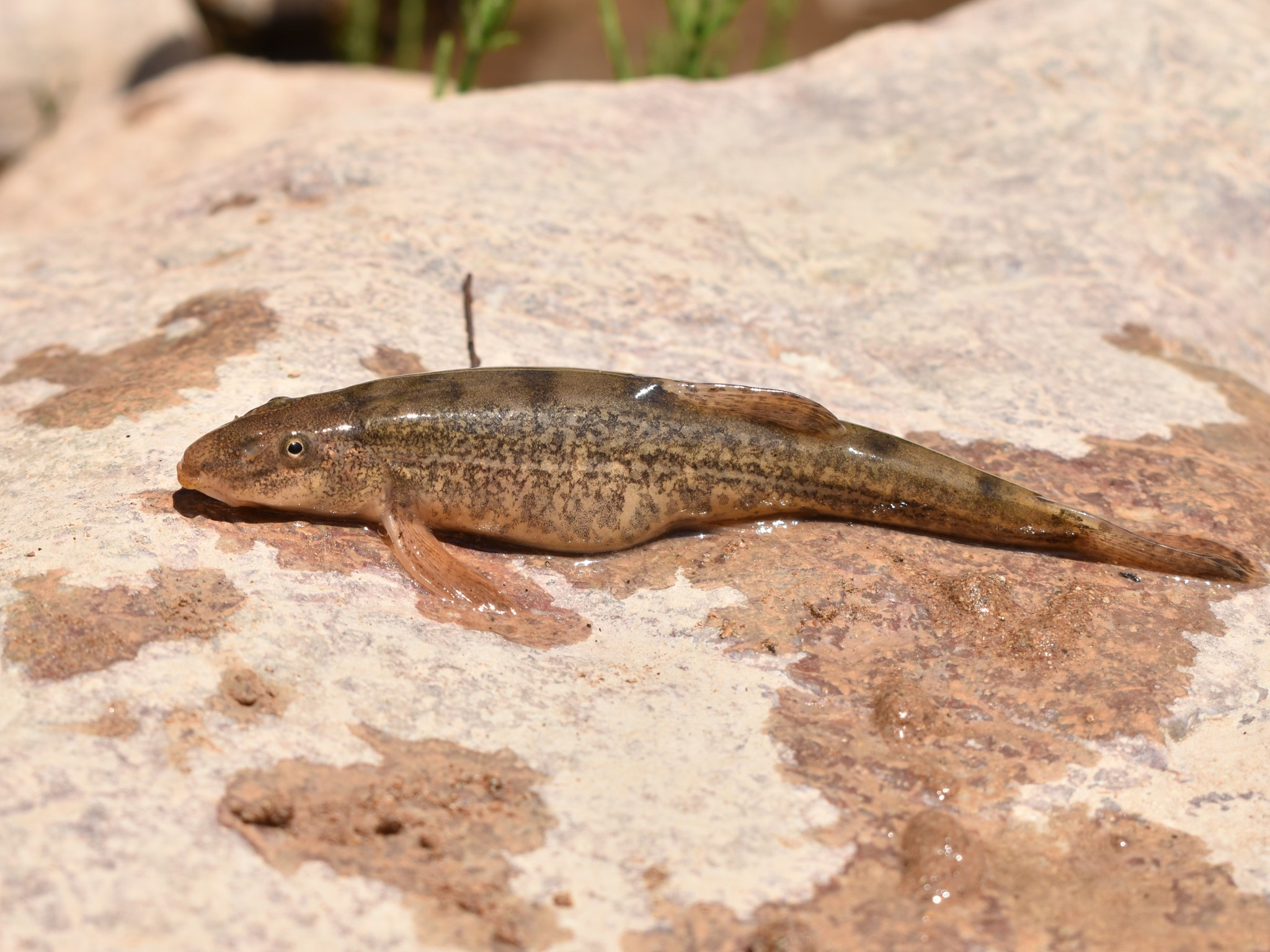

Scientific classification
- Kingdom: Animalia
- Phylum: Chordata
- Class: Actinopterygii
- Order: Cypriniformes
- Family: Nemacheilidae
- Genus: Triplophysa
- Species: T. brevicauda

Binomial name
- Triplophysa brevicauda (Herzenstein, 1888)

Synonyms
- Nemachilus Stoliczkae brevicauda Herzenstein, 1888

= Triplophysa brevicauda =

Species of fish

Triplophysa brevicauda is a species of stone loach. It is endemic to China and was first described from Dabsan Nur lake in Qinghai. It grows to 8.2 cm (3.2 in) SL.
