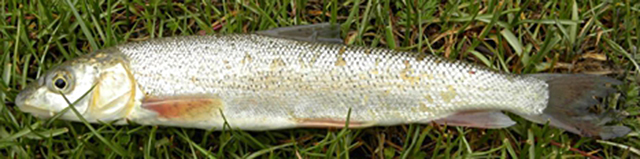

Conservation status
- Least Concern (IUCN 3.1)

Scientific classification
- Kingdom: Animalia
- Phylum: Chordata
- Class: Actinopterygii
- Order: Cypriniformes
- Family: Cyprinidae
- Genus: Ptychobarbus
- Species: P. dipogon

Binomial name
- Ptychobarbus dipogon (Regan, 1905)

Synonyms
- Schizothorax dipogon Regan, 1905; Diptychus dipogon (Regan, 1905)

= Ptychobarbus dipogon =

Species of fish

Ptychobarbus dipogon is a species of freshwater ray-finned fish belonging to the family Cyprinidae, the family which includes the carps, barbs, minnows and related fishes. This fish is found in the middle and upper Yarlung Zangbo, i.e. the upper Brahmaputra River drainage in Tibet. This is a benthopelagic fish found in the deeper parts of tributaries and meanders.
