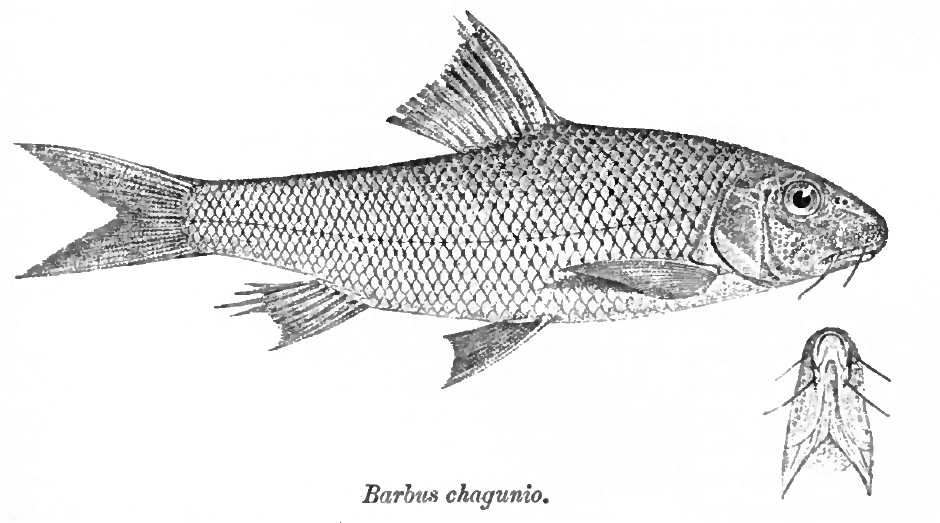

Conservation status
- Least Concern (IUCN 3.1)

Scientific classification
- Kingdom: Animalia
- Phylum: Chordata
- Class: Actinopterygii
- Order: Cypriniformes
- Family: Cyprinidae
- Genus: Chagunius
- Species: C. chagunio

Binomial name
- Chagunius chagunio (Hamilton, 1822)

Synonyms
- Cyprinus chagunio Hamilton, 1822; Catla chagunio (Hamilton, 1822); Barbus spilopholus McClelland, 1839; Barbus beavani Günther, 1868

= Chagunius chagunio =

Species of fish

Chagunius chagunio, the chaguni, is a species of cyprinid in the genus Chagunius. It inhabits wetlands in Bangladesh, India, Nepal and Bhutan.
