= Gnathopogon caerulescens =

- Male (top) and female (bottom)

Conservation status
- Endangered (IUCN 3.1)

Scientific classification
- Kingdom: Animalia
- Phylum: Chordata
- Class: Actinopterygii
- Order: Cypriniformes
- Suborder: Cyprinoidei
- Family: Gobionidae
- Genus: Gnathopogon
- Species: G. caerulescens

Binomial name
- Gnathopogon caerulescens (Sauvage, 1883)

Synonyms
- Squalius caerulescens Sauvage, 1883; Otakia rasborina D. S. Jordan & Snyder, 1900; Leucogobio jordani Ishikawa, 1901

Species of fish

Gnathopogon caerulescens, the Biwa moroko gudgeon is a species of ray-finned fish in the genus Gnathopogon endemic to Lake Biwa in Japan. It is sometimes known by its Japanese name 'Honmoroko' (ホンモロコ).

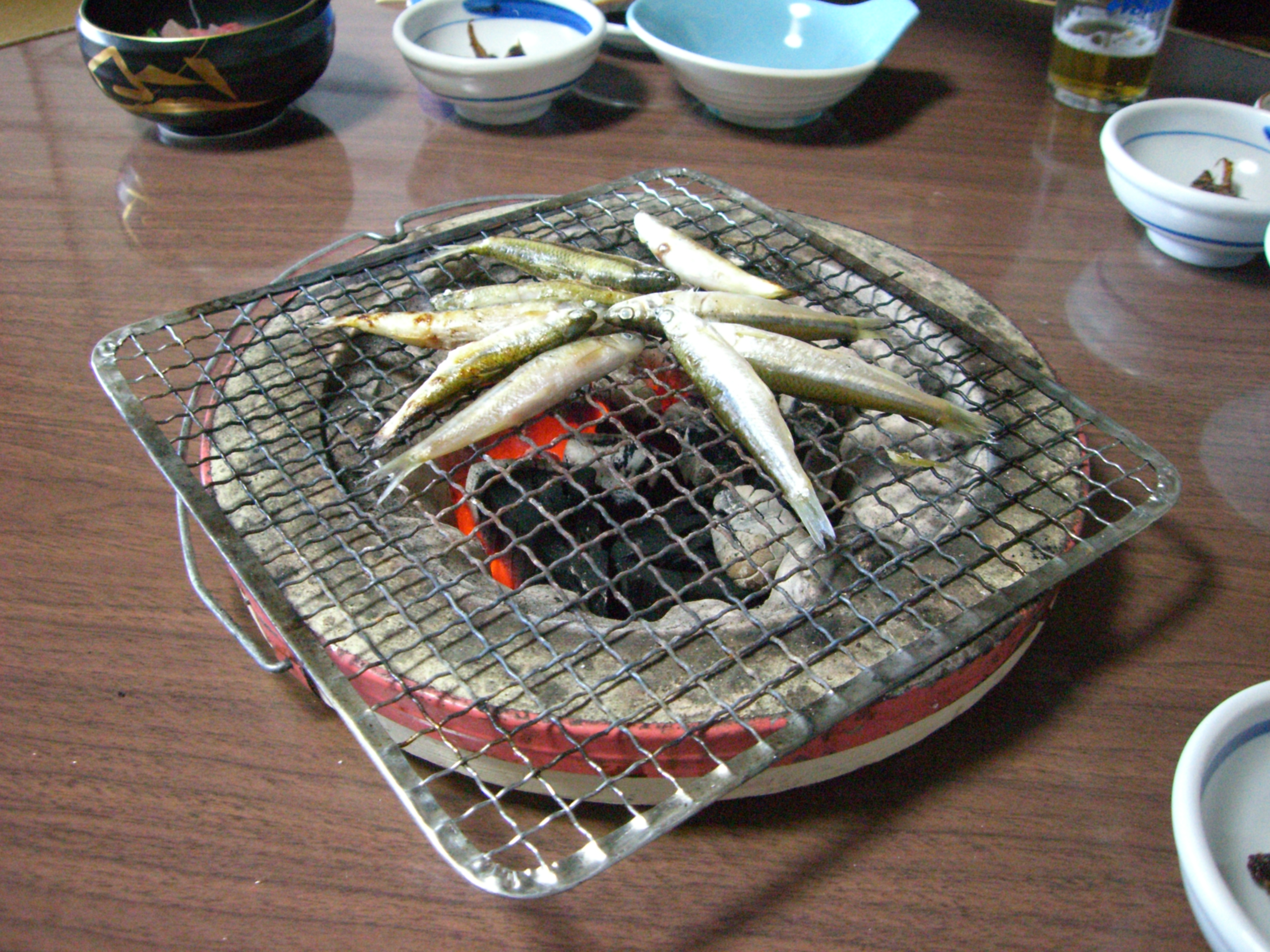
Char-broiled
