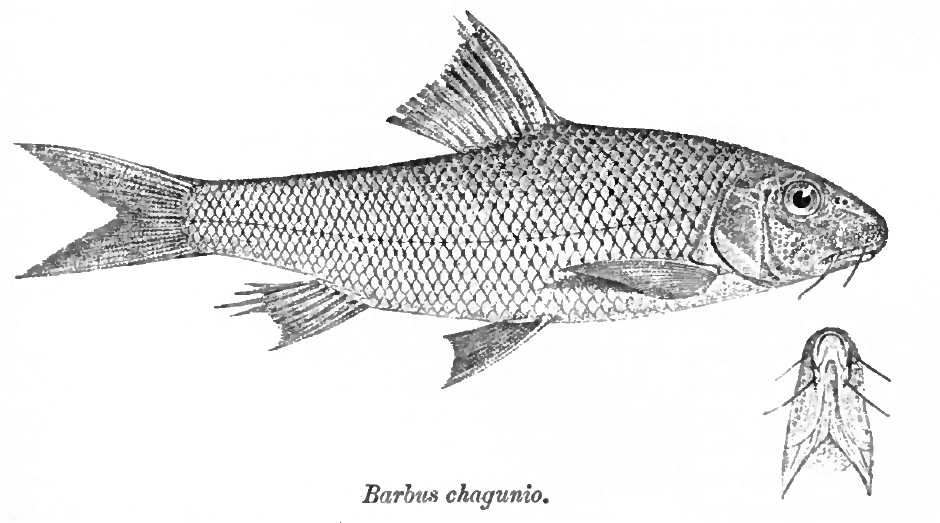

Conservation status
- Least Concern (IUCN 3.1)

Scientific classification
- Kingdom: Animalia
- Phylum: Chordata
- Class: Actinopterygii
- Order: Cypriniformes
- Family: Cyprinidae
- Genus: Chagunius
- Species: C. nicholsi

Binomial name
- Chagunius nicholsi (Myers, 1924)

Synonyms
- Barbus nicholsi Myers, 1924; Chagunius chagunio prashadi Talwar & Das, 1986

= Chagunius nicholsi =

Species of fish

Chagunius nicholsi is a species of cyprinid in the genus Chagunius that inhabits India and Myanmar. It inhabits India and Myanmar. Its maximum length is 30 cm (11.8 inches), and its maximum published weight is 900 g (1.98 lbs). Its habitat is inland wetlands. The specific name of this fish honours the American zoologist John Treadwell Nichols of the American Museum of Natural History who helped Myers with his work.
