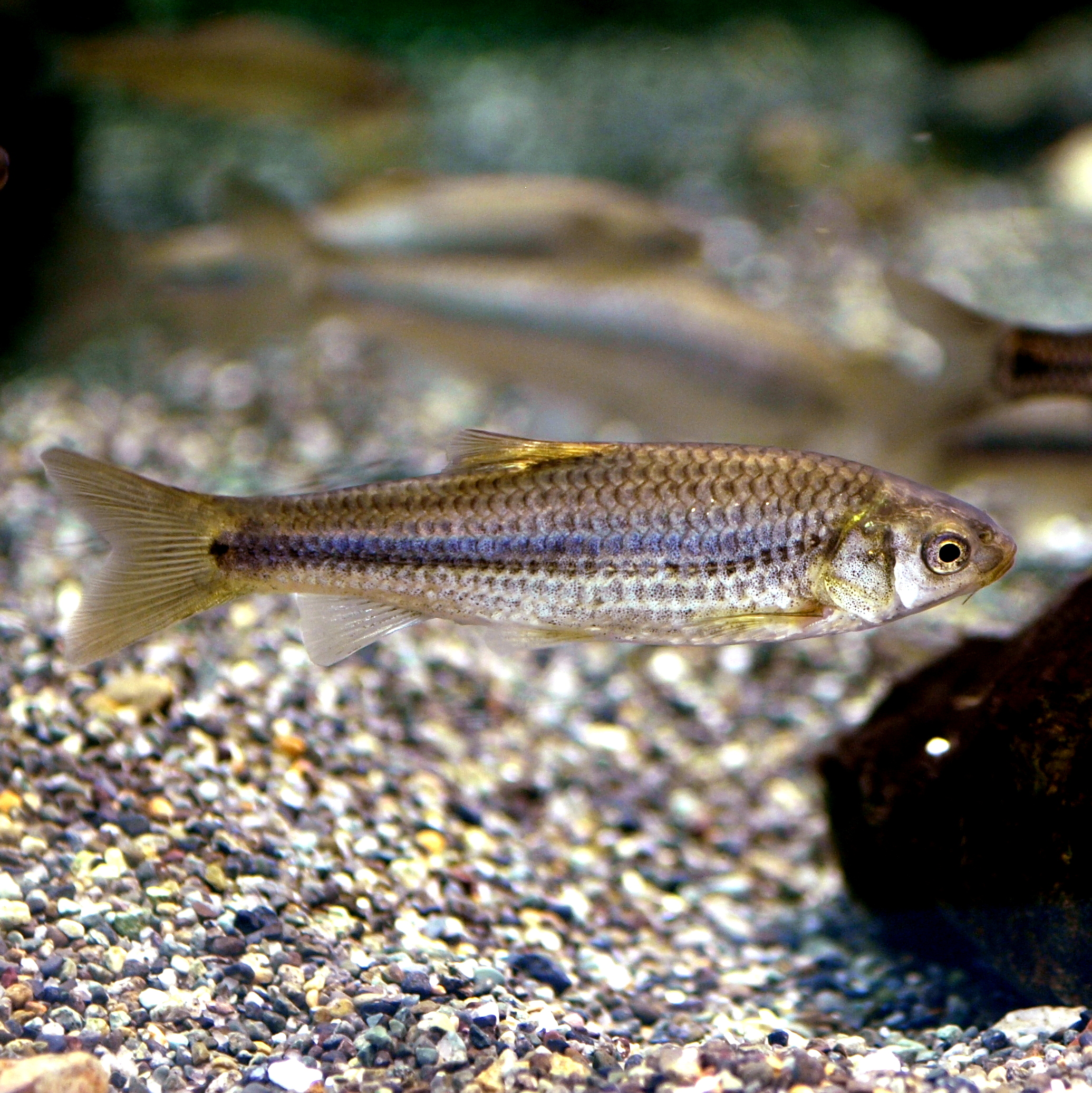

Scientific classification
- Domain: Eukaryota
- Kingdom: Animalia
- Phylum: Chordata
- Class: Actinopterygii
- Order: Cypriniformes
- Suborder: Cyprinoidei
- Family: Gobionidae
- Genus: Gnathopogon
- Species: G. elongatus

Binomial name
- Gnathopogon elongatus (Temminck & Schlegel, 1846)

Synonyms
- Capoeta elongata Temminck & Schegel, 1846; Barbus homogenes Günther, 1868; Leucogobio guentheri Ishikawa, 1901; Gnathopogon suwae D. S. Jordan & C. L, Hubbs, 1925

= Gnathopogon elongatus =

Species of fish

Gnathopogon elongatus is a species of ray-finned fish in the genus Gnathopogon endemic to Japan.
