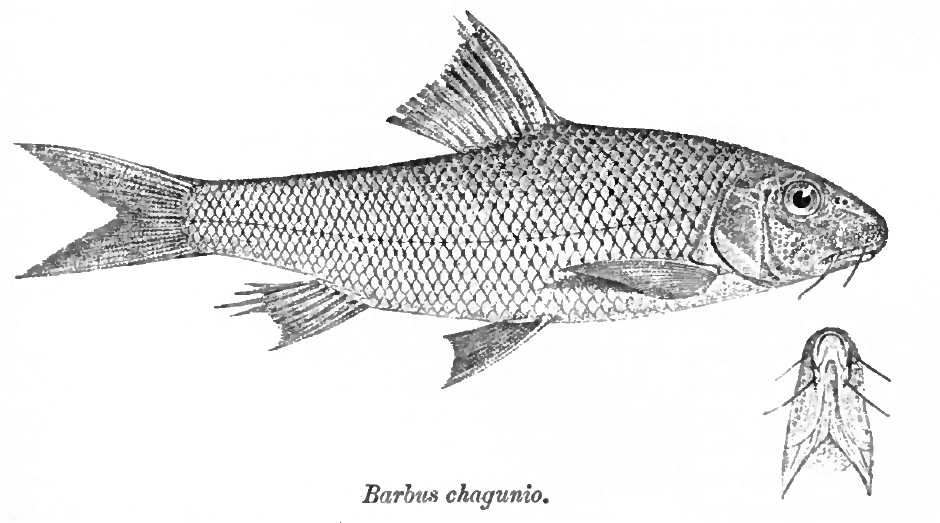
- Chaguni (C. chagunio)

Scientific classification
- Kingdom: Animalia
- Phylum: Chordata
- Class: Actinopterygii
- Order: Cypriniformes
- Family: Cyprinidae
- Subfamily: Smiliogastrinae
- Genus: Chagunius; H. M. Smith, 1938

Type species
- Cyprinus chagunio Hamilton, 1822

= Chagunius =

Genus of fishes

Chagunius is a genus of freshwater ray-finned fish belonging to the family Cyprinidae. which includes the carps, barbs and related fishes. The fishes in this genus occur in South and Southeast Asia.

== Species ==
There are currently three recognized species in this genus:

- Chagunius baileyi Rainboth, 1986
- Chagunius chagunio (F. Hamilton, 1822) (Chaguni)
- Chagunius nicholsi (G. S. Myers, 1924)
