= Gnathopogon nicholsi =

Conservation status
- Least Concern (IUCN 3.1)

Scientific classification
- Kingdom: Animalia
- Phylum: Chordata
- Class: Actinopterygii
- Order: Cypriniformes
- Suborder: Cyprinoidei
- Family: Gobionidae
- Genus: Gnathopogon
- Species: G. nicholsi

Binomial name
- Gnathopogon nicholsi (P.-W. Fang, 1943)

Synonyms
- Gobio nicholsi P.-W. Fang, 1943

Species of fish

Gnathopogon nicholsi is a species of ray-finned fish in the genus Gnathopogon endemic to the Yangtze River basin in China.

Named in honor of John Treadwell Nichols (1883-1958), curator of fishes at the American Museum of Natural History.
