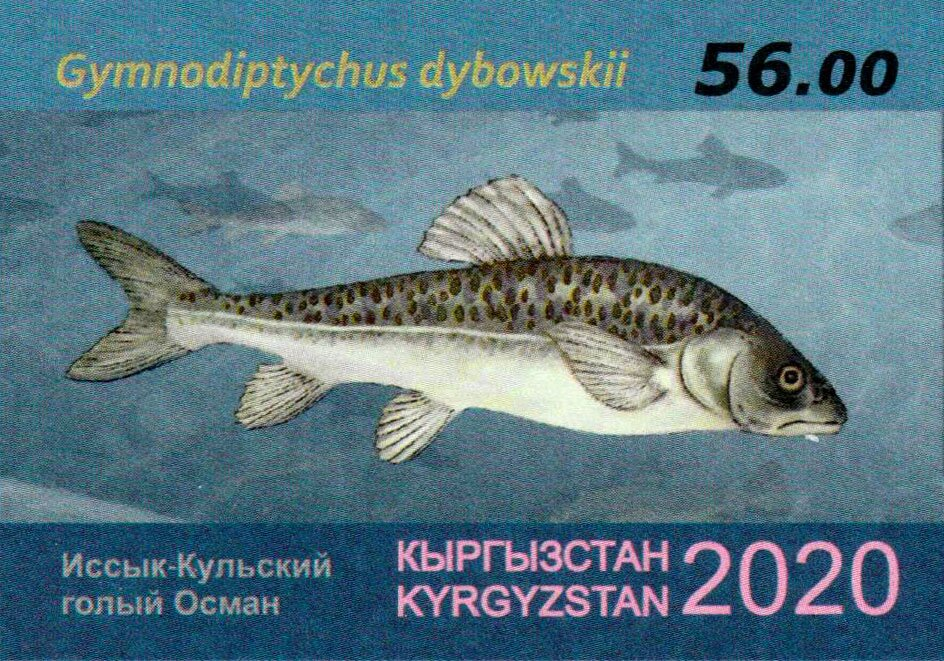

Conservation status
- Least Concern (IUCN 3.1)

Scientific classification
- Kingdom: Animalia
- Phylum: Chordata
- Class: Actinopterygii
- Order: Cypriniformes
- Family: Cyprinidae
- Genus: Gymnodiptychus
- Species: G. dybowskii

Binomial name
- Gymnodiptychus dybowskii (Kessler, 1874)

= Gymnodiptychus dybowskii =

Species of fish

Gymnodiptychus dybowskii (common name: naked osman) is a species of cyprinid in the genus Gymnodiptychus. It lives in Asia. It has a maximum length of 45 cm (1 ft 6 in) and a common length of 23 cm (9.1 in), and its heaviest recorded weight is 3 kg (6 lb 10 oz). It is named after Benedykt Dybowski.
