= Triplophysa stenura =

Conservation status
- Least Concern (IUCN 3.1)

Scientific classification
- Kingdom: Animalia
- Phylum: Chordata
- Class: Actinopterygii
- Order: Cypriniformes
- Family: Nemacheilidae
- Genus: Triplophysa
- Species: T. stenura

Binomial name
- Triplophysa stenura (Herzenstein, 1888)

Synonyms
- Nemacheilus stenurus; Nemachilus lhasae (Regan, 1905); Nemachilus stenurus

Species of fish

Triplophysa stenura is a species of ray-finned fish in the genus Triplophysa. It lives in swift-flowing streams and is known from the Upper Yangtze, Upper Mekong, Upper Salween and Upper Brahmaputra river drainages in China and Vietnam. Whether this apparently widespread species really is one species needs to be studied. It grows to 13.8 cm (5.4 in) SL.

A study from the Upper Brahmaputra found Triplophysa stenura to be the most prevalent prey species for Oxygymnocypris stewartii, a large predatory cyprinid. Triplophysa stenura were present in 47% of Oxygymnocypris stewartii stomachs.
