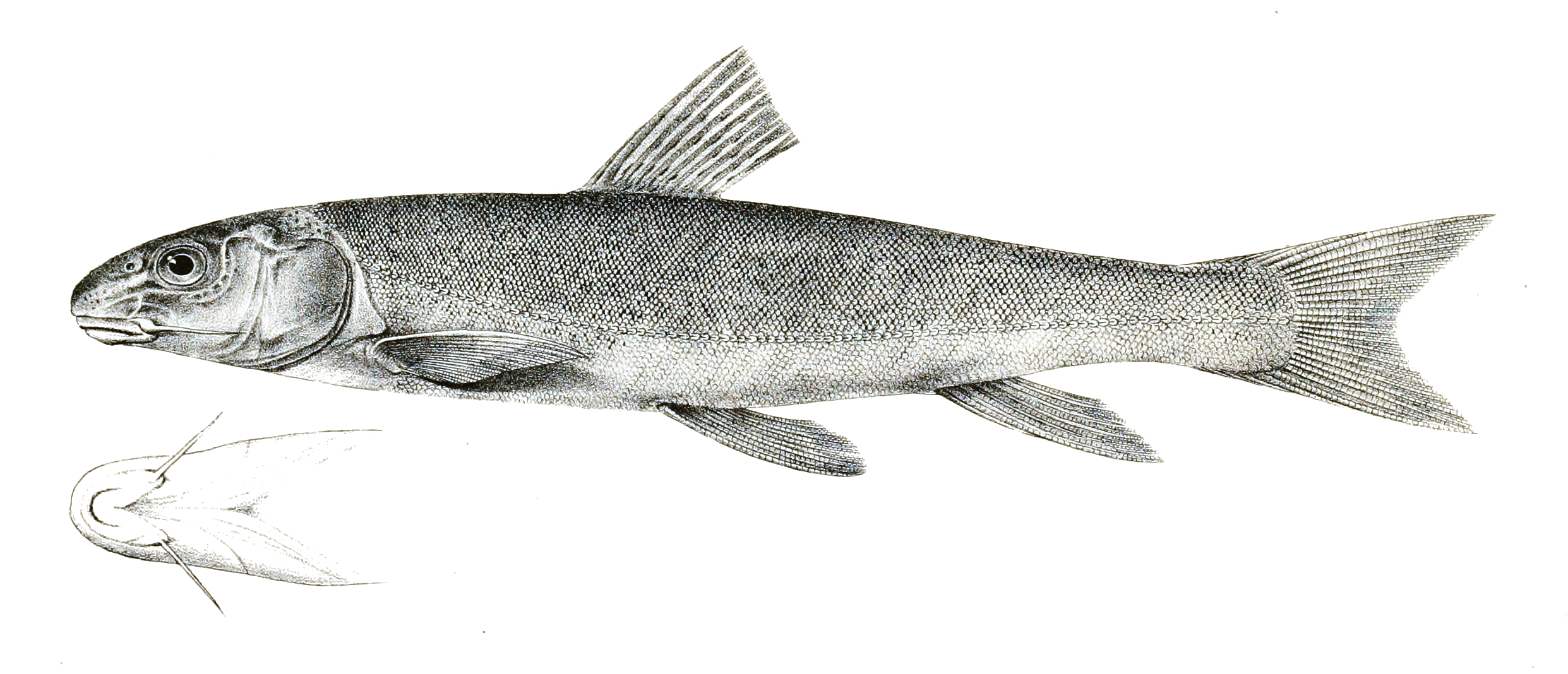

Conservation status
- Least Concern (IUCN 3.1)

Scientific classification
- Kingdom: Animalia
- Phylum: Chordata
- Class: Actinopterygii
- Order: Cypriniformes
- Family: Cyprinidae
- Genus: Ptychobarbus
- Species: P. conirostris

Binomial name
- Ptychobarbus conirostris Steindachner, 1866

Synonyms
- Ptychobarbus rattanis Malhotra & Jyoti, 1975

= Ptychobarbus conirostris =

Species of fish

Ptychobarbus conirostris, the Indus snowtrout, is a species of freshwater ray-finned fish in the family Cyprinidae, which includes the carps, barbs, minnows and related fishes. The Indus snowtrout is found in the Himalayas of Pakistan, India, southwestern China and, perhaps, Afghanistan. It is found in fast running cold water mountain streams and rivers with stony beds, in areas where temperatures seldom rise above 15 °C (59 °F), even in summer.
