= Ptychobarbus chungtienensis =

Conservation status
- Endangered (IUCN 3.1)

Scientific classification
- Kingdom: Animalia
- Phylum: Chordata
- Class: Actinopterygii
- Order: Cypriniformes
- Family: Cyprinidae
- Genus: Ptychobarbus
- Species: P. chungtienensis

Binomial name
- Ptychobarbus chungtienensis (W. H. Tsao, 1964)

Synonyms
- Diptychus chungtienensis W,H. Tsao, 1964; Ptychobarbus chungtienensis chungtienensis (W. H. Tsao, 1964)

Species of fish

Ptychobarbus chungtienensis, the heavy lips fish, is a species of freshwater ray-finned fish in the family Cyprinidae, which includes the carps, barbs, minnows and related fishes.

This species is endemic to China, where it is only known from Zhongdian in Yunnan. Here it is recorded from Bita Hai, Shudu Hu and Napa Hai, Xiaozhongdian He, Naya He and Geza He in the Jinsha Jiang river basin. Since the 1990s, it is extant only in Xiaozhongdian He, Gezan He and Bita Hai.

Threats to this species include development for tourism and invasive fish species. It is also poached by local people for food.
