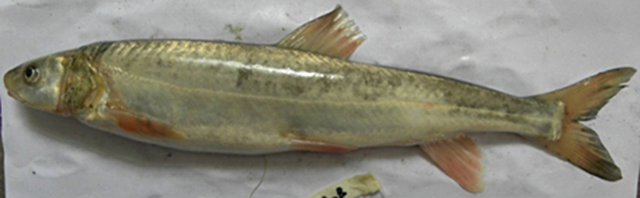

Conservation status
- Near Threatened (IUCN 3.1)

Scientific classification
- Kingdom: Animalia
- Phylum: Chordata
- Class: Actinopterygii
- Order: Cypriniformes
- Family: Cyprinidae
- Subfamily: Schizopygopsinae
- Genus: Oxygymnocypris; W. H. Tsao, 1964
- Species: O. stewartii

Binomial name
- Oxygymnocypris stewartii (Lloyd, 1908)

Synonyms
- Schizopygopsis stewartii Lloyd, 1908; Gymnocypris stewartii (Lloyd, 1908)

= Oxygymnocypris =

Species of fish

Oxygymnocypris is a monospecific genus of freshwater ray-finned fish belonging to the family Cyprinidae, the family which includes the carps, barbs and related fishes. The only species in this genus is Oxygymnocypris stewartii, a species endemic to Tibet and occurs in the Yarlung Tsangpo River (=upper Brahmaputra) and its tributaries at altitudes above 3,600 m (11,800 ft) in the Qinghai-Tibet Plateau.

== Life history and ecology ==
Oxygymnocypris grows to 59 cm (1.94 ft) in standard length, 67.6 cm (2.22 ft) in total length and 3 kg (6.6 lb) in weight. It is a long-lived (to 25 years), late-maturing species that reproduces annually.

Oxygymnocypris stewartii inhabits the deeper areas of clear, fast-flowing rivers with a rocky substrate. It is a generalized and opportunistic predator feeding both on fish and aquatic insects. Smaller specimens feed mostly on cobitid nemacheilid loaches and caddisflies of family Hydropsychidae, whereas larger individuals switch more towards cyprinid fishes and chironomid larvae. Triplophysa stenura is the most prevalent prey species, present in 47% of stomachs, but Schizopygopsis younghusbandi contributes most (59%) to prey weight. Insects are more important in winter and spring, and fishes in summer and autumn.

== Fishery ==
Oxygymnocypris is heavily used as a food fish and is thought to be overfished.
