= Gnathopogon imberbis =

Scientific classification
- Domain: Eukaryota
- Kingdom: Animalia
- Phylum: Chordata
- Class: Actinopterygii
- Order: Cypriniformes
- Suborder: Cyprinoidei
- Family: Gobionidae
- Genus: Gnathopogon
- Species: G. imberbis

Binomial name
- Gnathopogon imberbis (Sauvage & Dabry de Thiersant, 1874)

Synonyms
- Gobio imberbis Sauvage & Dabry de Thiersant, 1874

Species of fish

Gnathopogon imberbis is a species of ray-finned fish in the genus Gnathopogon endemic to China.
