= Triplophysa orientalis =

Conservation status
- Least Concern (IUCN 3.1)

Scientific classification
- Kingdom: Animalia
- Phylum: Chordata
- Class: Actinopterygii
- Order: Cypriniformes
- Family: Nemacheilidae
- Genus: Triplophysa
- Species: T. orientalis

Binomial name
- Triplophysa orientalis (Herzenstein, 1888)

Species of fish

Triplophysa orientalis is a species of stone loach. It is a freshwater fish from the Tibetan Plateau and is endemic to China; its distribution includes the upper reaches of the Yangtze and Yellow Rivers, among others. It lives in a wide range of habitats, both lentic and lotic. The species is widespread but populations tend to be isolated and show high degree of genetic divergence.
