= Schizopygopsis younghusbandi =

Conservation status
- Data Deficient (IUCN 3.1)

Scientific classification
- Kingdom: Animalia
- Phylum: Chordata
- Class: Actinopterygii
- Order: Cypriniformes
- Family: Cyprinidae
- Genus: Schizopygopsis
- Species: S. younghusbandi

Binomial name
- Schizopygopsis younghusbandi Regan, 1905

Subspecies
- Schizopygopsis younghusbandi shannaensis Wu, Tsao, Chen & Zhu, 1992; Schizopygopsis younghusbandi wui Tchang, Yueh & Hwang 1964

Synonyms
- Schizopygopsis kessleri makianensis Tchang, Yueh & Hwang, 1964

Species of fish

Schizopygopsis younghusbandi is a species of ray-finned fish endemic to Tibet. It occurs in the Yarlung Tsangpo River (=upper Brahmaputra) drainage and in endorheic lakes in its vicinity. Schizopygopsis younghusbandi grows to about 50 cm (1.6 ft) in total length.

Several species and subspecies are currently considered as junior synonyms of Schizopygopsis younghusbandi. The taxonomic status of these should be re-examined as they might be distinct species.

== Etymology ==
The Etyfish Project states that the patronym was not identified but clearly in honor of Lieut.-Col. Francis Edward Younghusband (1863-1942), who led a 1904 British expedition to Tibet, during which the type specimen was collected.

== Habitat and ecology ==
Schizopygopsis younghusbandi inhabits swift rivers with a rocky substrate, and mountain lakes. It is locally common.

Schizopygopsis younghusbandi has been found to be the prey species that contributed most to the diet of Oxygymnocypris stewartii, a large predatory cyprinid. On average, Schizopygopsis younghusbandi made 59% of Oxygymnocypris stewartii stomach content weight, more so among larger individuals than smaller ones.

== Fishery ==
Schizopygopsis younghusbandi is heavily used as a food fish and is among the most important commercial species in the area.
