= Ptychobarbus kaznakovi =

Conservation status
- Least Concern (IUCN 3.1)

Scientific classification
- Kingdom: Animalia
- Phylum: Chordata
- Class: Actinopterygii
- Order: Cypriniformes
- Family: Cyprinidae
- Genus: Ptychobarbus
- Species: P. kaznakovi

Binomial name
- Ptychobarbus kaznakovi A. M. Nikolskii, 1903

Synonyms
- Diptychus kaznakovi (Nikolskii, 1903)

Species of fish

Ptychobarbus kaznakovi, the bilobed-lip schizothoracin, is a species of freshwater ray-finned fish belonging to the family Cyprinidae, the family which includes the carps, barbs, minnows and related fishes. This fish is endemic to China where it occurs in the upper parts of the Nujiang, Lancangjiang) and Yangtze River basins in western China, in Tibet and Yunnan. This is a cold-water fish of plateaus, being found in sandy and pebbly-bottomed sluggish water of the main streams of rivers and main tributaries. It feeds largely on aquatic insects, as well as diatoms. The spawning seasonis in April and May, moving upstream to spawn and returning downstream in the autumn. A recent study projected that the habitat suitability of P. kaznakovi will decrease by approximately 23.21% under the highest-emission scenario by 2070.
