= Schizopygopsis dobula =

Conservation status
- Vulnerable (IUCN 3.1)

Scientific classification
- Kingdom: Animalia
- Phylum: Chordata
- Class: Actinopterygii
- Order: Cypriniformes
- Family: Cyprinidae
- Genus: Schizopygopsis
- Species: S. dobula

Binomial name
- Schizopygopsis dobula (Günther, 1868)

Synonyms
- Gymnocypris dobula Günther, 1868

Species of fish

Schizopygopsis dobula is a species of freshwater ray-finned fish belonging to the family Cyprinidae, the family which also includes the carps, barbs, minnowns and related fishes. This species is endemic to China where it is restricted to two lakes, Paiku Lake and Chuocuolong Lake in southern Tibet. It spawns in the streams which feed these lakes. This species has a maximum published standard length of 25.2 cm (9.9 in).
