= Chagunius baileyi =

Conservation status
- Data Deficient (IUCN 3.1)

Scientific classification
- Kingdom: Animalia
- Phylum: Chordata
- Class: Actinopterygii
- Order: Cypriniformes
- Family: Cyprinidae
- Genus: Chagunius
- Species: C. baileyi

Binomial name
- Chagunius baileyi Rainboth, 1986

Species of fish

Chagunius baileyi is a species of freshwater fish of the genus Chagunius found in Myanmar and Thailand in the Salween and Sittaung rivers. The specific name of this fish honours the American ichthyologist Reeve Maclaren Bailey who was the co-chair of Walter Rainboth's Ph.D committee at the University of Michigan.
