= Schizopygopsis kialingensis =

Conservation status
- Least Concern (IUCN 3.1)

Scientific classification
- Kingdom: Animalia
- Phylum: Chordata
- Class: Actinopterygii
- Order: Cypriniformes
- Family: Cyprinidae
- Genus: Schizopygopsis
- Species: S. kialingensis

Binomial name
- Schizopygopsis kialingensis W. X. Tsao & C. L. Tun, 1962

Species of fish

Schizopygopsis kialingensis is a species of freshwater ray-finned fish belonging to the family Cyprinidae, the family which also includes the carps, barbs, minnowns and related fishes. This fish is endemic to the upper Jialing Jiang basin in Gansu and Sichuan in China. It is found in cold water in shallow, slow-flowing highland hill streams and in small lakes. Its diet is zoobenthos and benthic algae. This species spawns in June and July. This species has a maximum published standard length of 18.3 cm (7.2 in).
