= Gnathopogon mantschuricus =

Conservation status
- Least Concern (IUCN 3.1)

Scientific classification
- Kingdom: Animalia
- Phylum: Chordata
- Class: Actinopterygii
- Order: Cypriniformes
- Family: Gobionidae
- Genus: Gnathopogon
- Species: G. mantschuricus

Binomial name
- Gnathopogon mantschuricus (Berg, 1914)

Synonyms
- Gobio taeniatus mantschuricus Berg, 1914

Species of fish

Gnathopogon mantschuricus is a species of freshwater ray-finned fish belonging to the family Gobionidae, the gudgeons. This fish is found in the Amur and Liaohe Rivers in China, Mongolia and Russia and in the Korean Peninsula.
