= Triplophysa siluroides =

Scientific classification
- Kingdom: Animalia
- Phylum: Chordata
- Class: Actinopterygii
- Order: Cypriniformes
- Family: Nemacheilidae
- Genus: Triplophysa
- Species: T. siluroides

Binomial name
- Triplophysa siluroides (Herzenstein, 1888)

Species of fish

Triplophysa siluroides is a large species of stone loach, which is endemic to the upper parts of the Yellow River basin in the Chinese provinces of Qinghai, Gansu and Sichuan.

T. siluroides reaches up to 50 cm (1.6 ft) in standard length and 1.5 kg (3.3 lb) in weight, making it the largest species in its family. It is a benthic predator that feeds on small fish and invertebrates.

== Description ==
The species is known to have a large head depressed with 3 barbel pairs and a caudal fin emarginate. The upper body is slightly longer, as for the color the body is of yellowish brown color with brown circles accompanies by cloudy patterns on the sides.

The fish mostly inhabits high elevation levels above the seas levels. Though it is a carnivorous fish it is deemed harmless to humans.

An important food fish, it has seriously declined and is now considered vulnerable according to China's Red List. The species has been bred and raised in captivity.
