= North West Nuclear Weapons Research and Design Academy =

North West Nuclear Weapons Research and Design Academy also known as the Ninth Academy and Koko Nor Complex was established by the Ninth Bureau of the Ministry of Public Security of the People's Republic of China in Amdo, Qinghai, Tibet, China in 1958. For nearly twenty years, the facility was responsible for the production of China's nuclear weapons.

== Nuclearization of Tibet ==
In 1993, China has been accused of "nuclear-weapons research on the Tibetan plateau and dumping radioactive waste there".
