= Gaoligongia =

Conservation status
- Vulnerable (IUCN 3.1)

Scientific classification
- Kingdom: Animalia
- Phylum: Chordata
- Class: Actinopterygii
- Division: Teleostei
- Order: Cypriniformes
- Family: Cyprinidae
- Genus: Gaoligongia; Liu, Liu, Xu, He, He & Chen, 2026
- Species: G. integrigymnatus

Binomial name
- Gaoligongia integrigymnatus (Mo, 1989)

Species of fish

Gaoligongia is a monotypic genus of cyprinid in the family Schizopygopsinae. The only species is Gaoligongia integrigymnatus. It is endemic to Gaoligong Mountain where it lives in the Irrawaddy River basin (Longchuanjiang and Dayingjiang Rivers) as well as the Nujiang River in Tengchong, Yunnan, China and has a maximum length of 12.9 cm (5.1 in). The genus was erected in 2026.
