= Acanthogobio =

Scientific classification
- Kingdom: Animalia
- Phylum: Chordata
- Class: Actinopterygii
- Order: Cypriniformes
- Suborder: Cyprinoidei
- Family: Gobionidae
- Genus: Acanthogobio; Herzenstein, 1892
- Species: A. guentheri

Binomial name
- Acanthogobio guentheri Herzenstein, 1892

Species of fish

Acanthogobio is a monospecific genus of freshwater ray-finned fish belonging to the family Gobionidae, the gudgeons. The only species in the genus is Acanthogobio guentheri which is a fish that is endemic to China. It is found only in the Yellow and Sinin Rivers. It can reach a length of up to 20 cm.

It is named in honor of the German-born British ichthyologist and herpetologist Albert Günther (1830–1914).
