= Gongzhucuo =

Freshwater lake in the Tibet Region

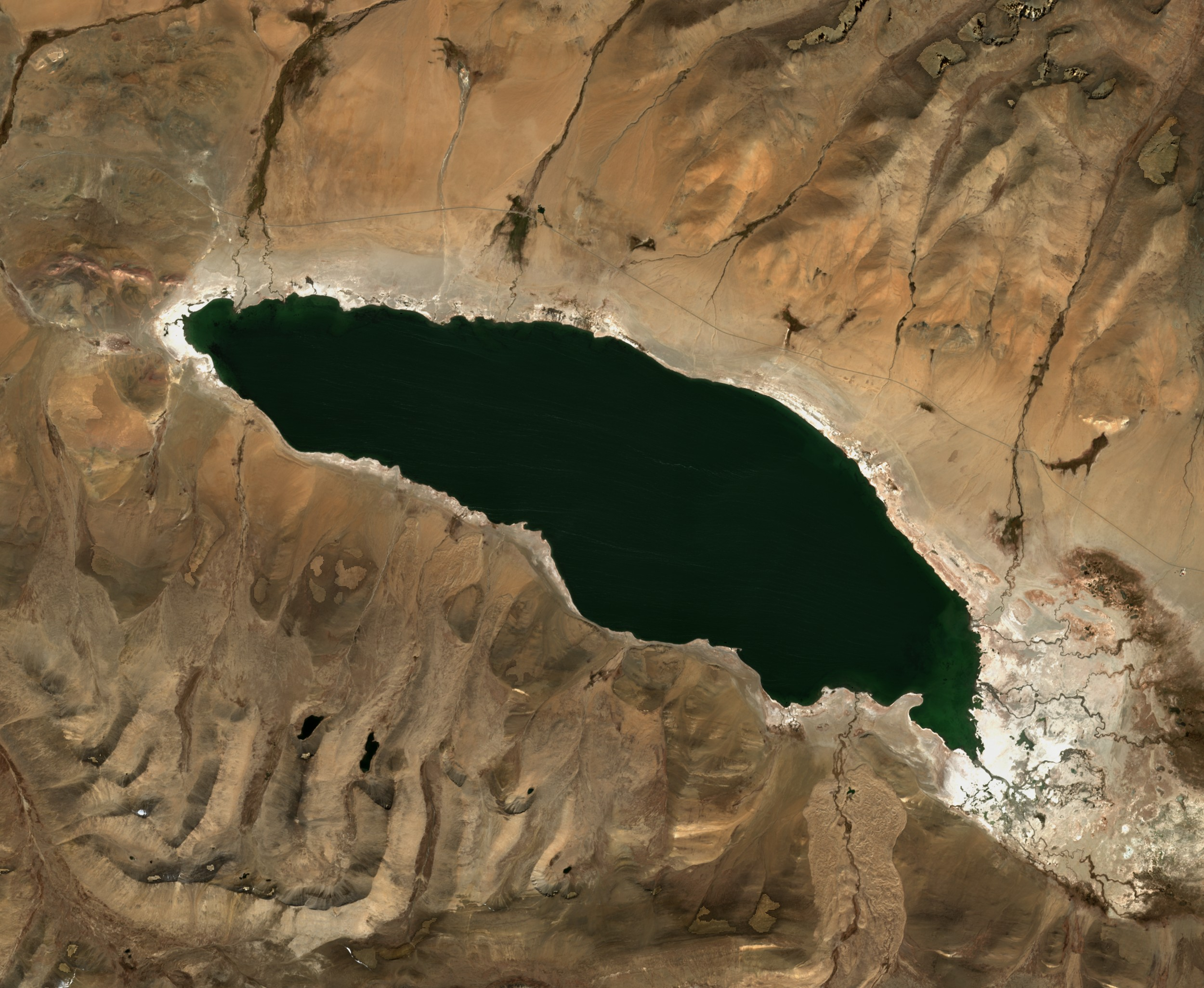
- Sentinel-2 image (2021)

- Location within Tibet
- Location: Burang County, Ngari Prefecture, Tibet,
- Coordinates: 30°38′40.32″N 82°08′00.71″E
- Surface area: 66.2 km^{2} (25.6 sq mi)
- Max. depth: 90 m (300 ft)
- Surface elevation: 4,786 m (15,702 ft)
- Frozen: Winter

Gongzhucuo (Tibetan: གུང་རྒྱུད་མཚོ, Mandarin Chinese: 公珠错) is a lake situated on a plateau in Ngari Prefecture of Tibet Autonomous Region in China.

== Location ==
Gongzhucuo lake is located in Burang County of Ngari Prefecture in Tibet at a height of 4,786 m (15,702 ft). It covers an area of 66.2 square kilometers. The average annual temperature is 0-2 °C and the average annual precipitation is 200–300 mm. The water to the lake is mainly supplied by surface runoff.

China National Highway 219 passes through the north bank of the lake.
