= John Treadwell Nichols =

American ichthyologist and ornithologist

- Born: June 11, 1883; Boston, Massachusetts
- Died: November 10, 1958 (aged 75); Garden City, New York
- Education: Harvard College
- Spouse: Cornelia DuBois Floyd
- Scientific career
- Fields: Ichthyology, ornithology
- Workplaces: American Museum of Natural History

John Treadwell Nichols (June 11, 1883 – November 10, 1958) was an American ichthyologist and ornithologist.

== Life and career ==
Nichols was born in Jamaica Plain, Boston, Massachusetts, the son of Mary Blake (Slocum) and John White Treadwell Nichols. In 1906 he studied vertebrate zoology at Harvard College, where he graduated with a Bachelor of Arts (AB). In 1907 he joined the American Museum of Natural History as assistant in the department of mammalogy. In 1913 he founded Copeia, the official journal of the American Society of Ichthyologists and Herpetologists. In 1916 he described the long lost Bermuda petrel together with Louis Leon Arthur Mowbray who first sighted this bird within a flock of other petrels in 1906 on Castle Island, Bermuda 45 years before it was officially rediscovered by Mowbray's son Louis. He also described the fish genus Bajacalifornia. He also worked with a team of scientists from the American Museum of Natural History during the Jersey Shore shark attacks of 1916. From 1913 to 1952 he was first assistant curator, then associate curator in charge, and finally curator in the Department of Ichthyology at the American Museum of Natural History.

Nichols wrote 1,000 articles and several books (mostly about fish but also about birds), and he made many expeditions around the world.

He was married to Cornelia DuBois Floyd (October 24, 1882 – December 1977), granddaughter of U.S. Representative from New York John G. Floyd.

Nichols died in Garden City, New York. His grandchildren are novelist John Nichols and politician William Weld.

== Eponyms ==
Nichols is honored in the scientific names of two species of reptiles: Dipsas nicholsi and Sphaerodactylus nicholsi. and the generic name of a genus of parrotfishes, Nicholsina.

Additionally the following fish species were named for him.

- Gobiobotia nicholsi Bănărescu & Nalbant, 1966
- Chagunius nicholsi (Myers, 1924)
- Romanogobio johntreadwelli (Bănărescu & Nalbant, 1973)
- Gnathopogon nicholsi (P. W. Fang, 1943)

== Selected works ==
- Fishes in the Vicinity of New York City (1918)
- The Freshwater Fishes of China (1943)
- Field book of Fresh-water Fishes of North America North of Mexico
- Marine Fishes of New York and Southern New England
- Fishes and Shells of the Pacific World (1945)
- Representative North American Fresh-water Fishes (1942)

== See also ==
- Category:Taxa named by John Treadwell Nichols
- Minerva Parker Nichols, wife of his father's second cousin.
