= Schizopygopsinae =

Scientific classification
- Kingdom: Animalia
- Phylum: Chordata
- Class: Actinopterygii
- Division: Teleostei
- Order: Cypriniformes
- Family: Cyprinidae
- Subfamily: Schizopygopsinae; Mirza, 1991

Schizopygopsinae, the mountain barbels, is a subfamily of freshwater ray-finned fishes belonging to the family Cyprinidae, which includes the carps, barbs, minnows and related fishes. The fishes in this subfamily are found in Asia.

== Genera ==
Schizopygopsinae contains the following genera:

- Diptychus Steindachner, 1866
- Gaoligongia Liu, Liu, Xu, He, He & Chen, 2026
- Gymnodiptychus Herzenstein, 1892
- Oxygymnocypris W. H. Tsao, 1964
- Ptychobarbus Steindachner, 1866
- Schizopygopsis Steindachner, 1866
