= Solomon Herzenstein =

Russian zoologist (1854–1894)

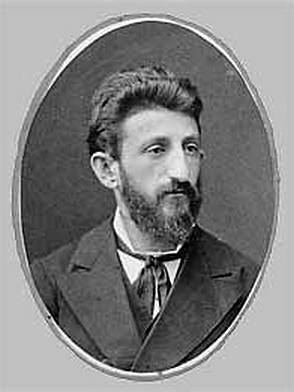
- Born: 1854
- Died: August 7, 1894 (aged 39–40); Saint Petersburg, Russian Empire
- Education: St. Petersburg University
- Scientific career
- Fields: Zoology

Solomon Markovich Herzenstein (Russian: Соломон Маркович Герценштейн; 1854 – August 7, 1894) was a Russian zoologist.

== Biography ==
Herzenstein received a degree in natural sciences and mathematics from St. Petersburg University and was appointed as the custodian of the Zoological Museum of the Imperial Academy of Science in 1879 or 1880. He also supervised practical training at the University for Women. In 1880, 1884, and 1887, he was commissioned to travel to the Murman Coast of the Kola Peninsula to study the mollusks and fishes there.

His work, "Materialy k Faunye Murmanskavo Berega i Byelavo Morya," which was published in the Trudy of the St. Petersburg Obshchestvo Yestestvoispitatelei in 1885, became a standard reference. He co-wrote Zamyetki po Ikhtologii Basseina Ryeki Amura (1887) and Nauchnye Rezultaty Puteshestvi Przevalskavo (1888–91) with N. L. Varpakhovski. He also wrote Ryby (St. Petersburg, 1888-91), and published "Ichthyologische Bemerkungen" in the Bulletin de l'Académie impériale des sciences de Saint-Pétersbourg (1890-92).

== Species described ==
- Acanthogobio guentheri (Herzenstein, 1892)
- Gymnocypris potanini (Herzenstein, 1891)
- Triplophysa alticeps (Herzenstein, 1888)
- Triplophysa brachyptera (Herzenstein, 1888)
- Triplophysa brevicauda (Herzenstein, 1888)
- Triplophysa chondrostoma (Herzenstein, 1888)
- Triplophysa crassicauda (Herzenstein, 1888)
- Triplophysa incipiens (Herzenstein, 1888)
- Triplophysa leptosoma (Herzenstein, 1888)
- Triplophysa macropterus (Herzenstein, 1888)
- Triplophysa orientalis (Herzenstein, 1888)
- Triplophysa scleroptera (Herzenstein, 1888)
- Triplophysa siluroides (Herzenstein, 1888)
- Triplophysa stenura (Herzenstein, 1888)

== Tribute ==
- Gnathopogon herzensteini (Günther, 1896) was probably named in honor of Herzenstein, who named an Acanthogobio after Günther in 1892.
- Asprocottus herzensteini (L. S. Berg, 1906), the Herzenstein's rough sculpin.
