= List of Slovenian biologists =

List of notable biologists from Slovenia

== D ==
- Dragotin Dežman (1821 - 1889)

== G ==
- Matija Gogala (b. 1937)
- Pavel Grošelj

== H ==
- Franc de Paula Hladnik (1773 - 1844)

== K ==
- Jožef Kalasanc Erberg (1771 - 1843)

== M ==
- Ernest Mayer (b. 1920)

== P ==
- Angela Piskernik (1886 - 1967)

== R ==
- Ivan Regen (1868 - 1947)

== S ==
- Boris Sket

== T ==
- Kazimir Tarman (b. 1930)

== Z ==
- Miroslav Zei (1914-2006)

== See also ==
- List of Slovenian botanists
