= List of Slovenian botanists =

List of notable botanists from Slovenia

== D ==
- Dragotin Dežman (1821–1889)

== H ==
- Franc de Paula Hladnik (1773–1844)

== J ==
- Fran Jesenko (1875–1932)

== K ==
- Jožef Kalasanc Erberg (1771–1843)

== M ==
- Ernest Mayer (1920–2009)

== P ==
- Angela Piskernik (1886–1967)

== S ==
- Giovanni Antonio Scopoli (1723–1788)

== See also ==
- List of Slovenian biologists
