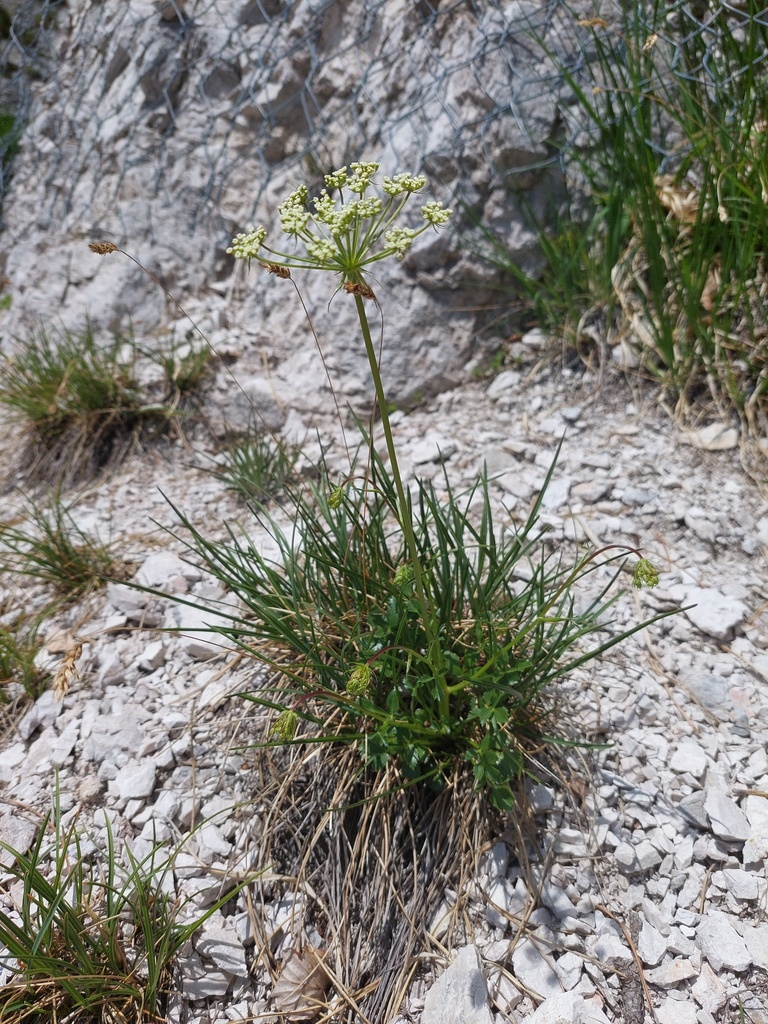

Conservation status
- Data Deficient (IUCN 3.1)

Scientific classification
- Kingdom: Plantae
- Clade: Tracheophytes
- Clade: Angiosperms
- Clade: Eudicots
- Clade: Asterids
- Order: Apiales
- Family: Apiaceae
- Genus: Hladnikia; Rchb.
- Species: H. pastinacifolia

Binomial name
- Hladnikia pastinacifolia Rchb.

Synonyms
- Carum latifolium (Bluff, Nees & Schauer) Benth. & Hook.f. ex B.D.Jacks.; Critamus latifolius Bluff, Nees & Schauer; Falcaria latifolia (Bluff, Nees & Schauer) Koch; Falcaria pastinacifolia (Rchb.) Rchb.fil.; Prionitis pastinacifolia (Rchb.) Koso-Pol.

= Hladnikia =

Genus of flowering plants

Hladnikia is a monotypic genus of flowering plants belonging to the family Apiaceae. Its sole species, Hladnikia pastinacifolia, is a Slovenian paleoendemite, restricted to the area of only 4 km^{2}, located in Trnovo Forest Plateau, karst plateau of Western Slovenia. German botanist Heinrich Gottlieb Ludwig Reichenbach named the genus after Carniolan botanist and founder of Ljubljana Botanical Garden Franz Hladnik.

== Description ==
Hladnikia pastinacifolia is a monocarpic herbaceous perennial plant, which takes a few vegetation periods to develop into a flowering plant. Individuals, which have erect flowering stem, can reach from 15 to 30 centimetres of height. At first plant's leathery and glossy leaves are simple shaped and arranged into rosettes. Later on, as their area increases, leaves also change shape into lobate. Hladnikia pastinacifolia resembles well-known celery (Apium graveolens), but has thicker foliage and shorter leaf stems. The species' root is long and lignified. The plant's flower has white, heart-shaped and 1 mm long petals.

Not much is known about the plant's exact breeding system. This plant species is entomophilous and has multiple different pollinators. It is thought that outcrossing happens occasionally. The species flowering period is between Mai and July. After successful pollination seeds that don't have any special dispersal adaptation develop between the end of August and into September. A fruit is a schizocarp, which after maturing splits into two 4 mm sized mericarps, 2 mm wide.

Hladnikia pastinacifolia chromosome number is 2n = 22.

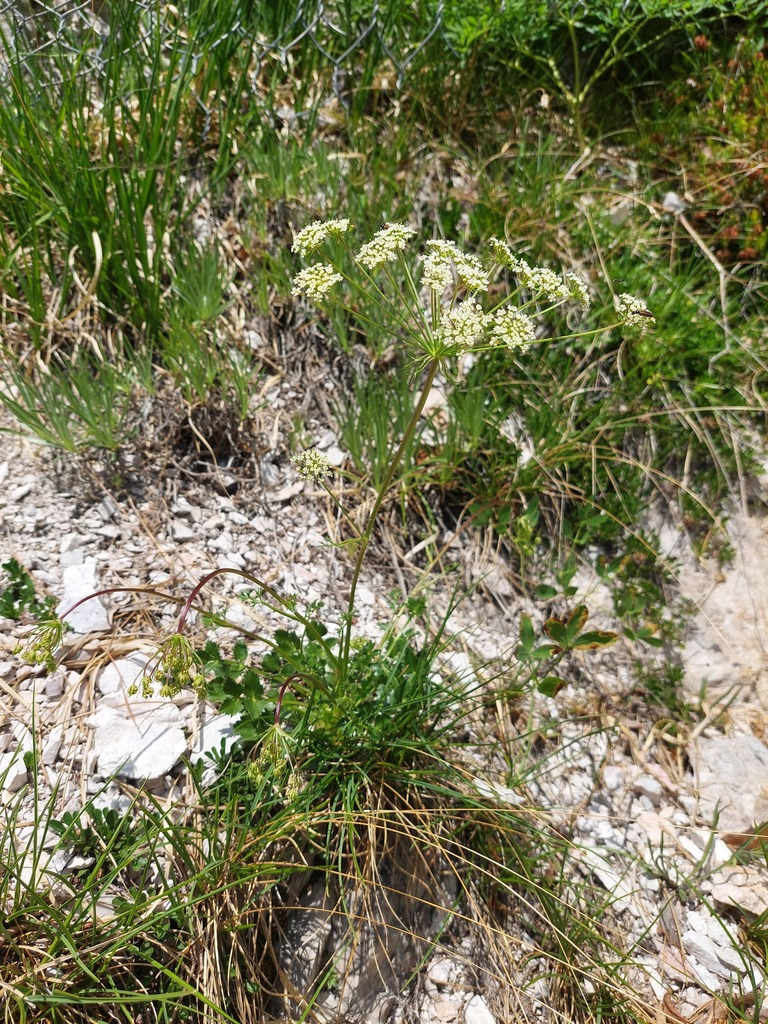

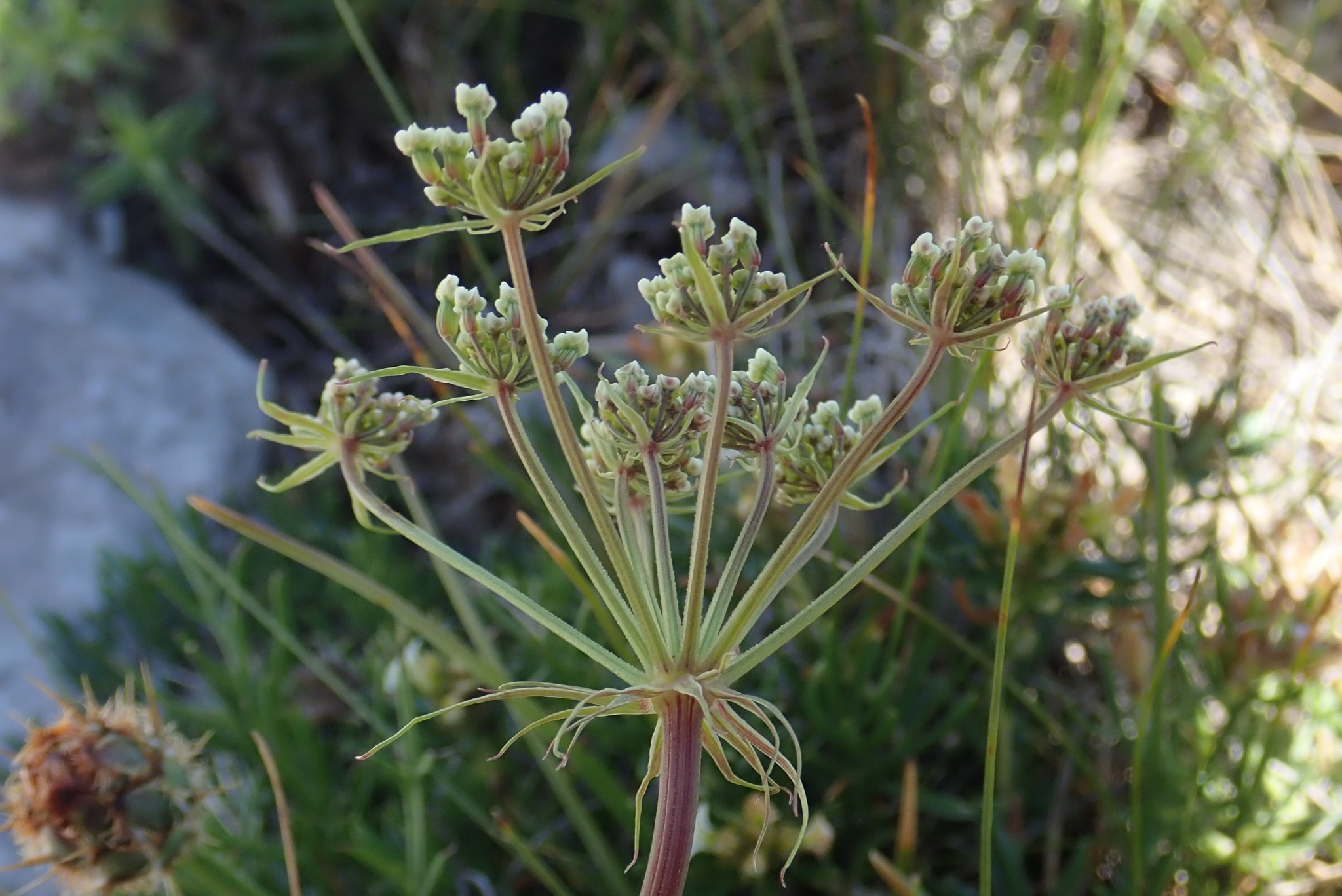

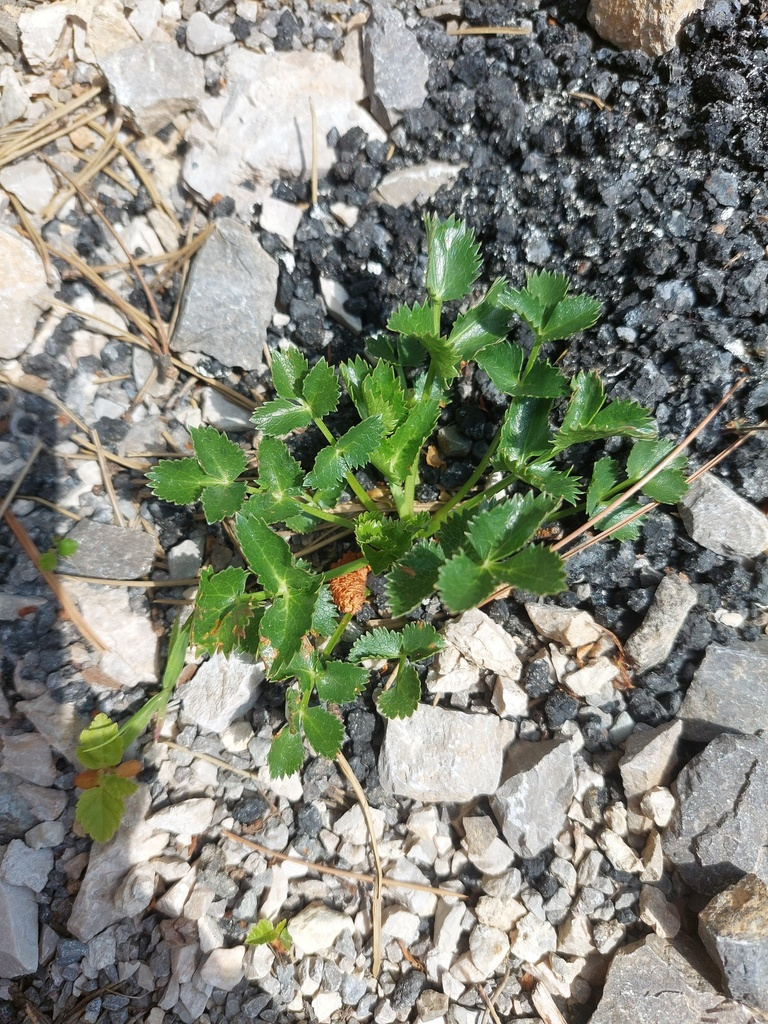

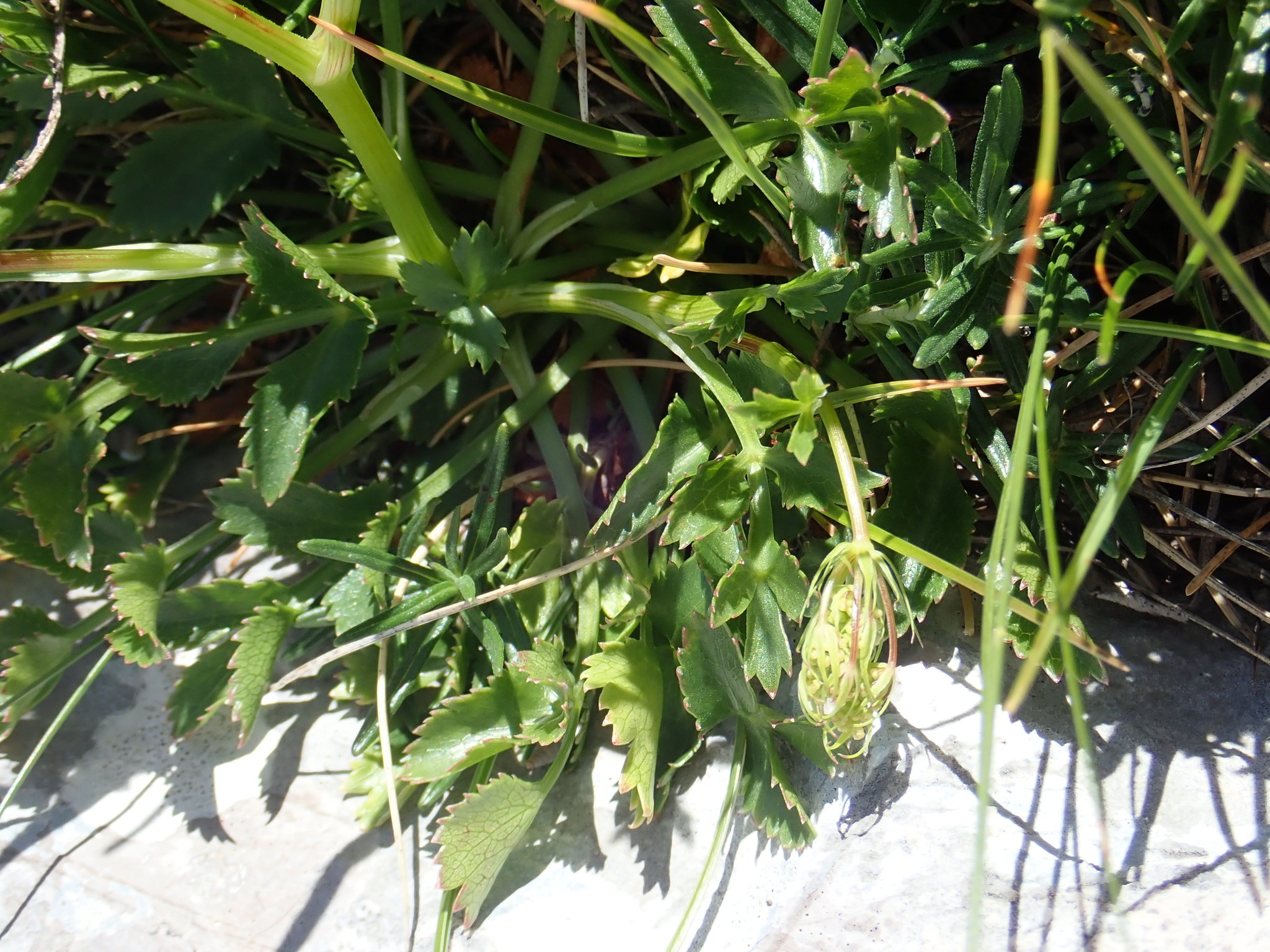

== Distribution and conservation ==
The plant is a Slovenian paleoendemic species restricted to small area (4 km^{2}) in Trnovski gozd. There these plants grow only on southern slopes of the plateau and two isolated areas located 9 km away on the northern slopes. As the plant species is not a habitat specialist its growing areas are various; Hladnikia pastinacifolia was found on stony grasslands, rock crevices and screes. Laboratory molecular analyses have shown that Hladnikia pastinacifolia is a Pleistocene survivor in situ.

Even though its population trend is labeled as stable by IUCN Red list, it has data deficient (DD) conservation status. Among mentioned threats are human intrusions and disturbance (such as recreational activities) as well as natural system modifications. The Trnovo Forest Plateau is listed as Natura 2000 site. Because of its small area of distribution and different threats the species is studied for possible cryopreservation.
