= Niphargellus =

Scientific classification
- Kingdom: Animalia
- Phylum: Arthropoda
- Class: Malacostraca
- Order: Amphipoda
- Family: Niphargidae
- Genus: Niphargellus; Schellenberg, 1938

Genus of crustaceans

Niphargellus is a genus of Amphipod crustaceans within the family Niphargidae. The genus contains three known species, which are characterized by the absence of D-setae on the Amphipods mandibular palp. The presence or absence of setae, specifically the D-setae, is a distinguishing feature used to classify organisms within the genus.

Niphargellus species live in freshwater environments such as caves, springs and the interstitial spaces of river beds. Species are native to Europe, where they can be found in England, Germany and the Czech Republic.

A cladogram according to the Catalogue of Life:

- Niphargidae
  - Niphargellus
    - Niphargellus arndti
    - Niphargellus glenniei
    - Niphargellus nolli
  - Carinurella
  - Chaetoniphargus
  - Exniphargus
  - Foroniphargus
  - Haploginglymus
  - Microniphargus
  - Niphargobates
  - Niphargobatoides
  - Niphargus
  - Pontoniphargus

== Species list ==
- Niphargellus arndti (Schellenberg, 1933) - Found living in freshwater springs in the Czech Republic.
- Niphargellus glenniei (Spooner, 1952) - Found living in cave water in Southwest England.
- Niphargellus nolli (Schellenberg, 1938) - Found living in interstitial spaces within riverbeds in Germany.
