= Niphargus stenopus =

Conservation status
- Vulnerable (IUCN 2.3)

Scientific classification
- Kingdom: Animalia
- Phylum: Arthropoda
- Class: Malacostraca
- Order: Amphipoda
- Family: Niphargidae
- Genus: Niphargus
- Species: N. stenopus

Binomial name
- Niphargus stenopus Sket, 1960

Species of crustacean

Niphargus stenopus is a species of freshwater amphipod crustacean which is endemic to Slovenia.
