= Niphargus aberrans =

Conservation status
- Vulnerable (IUCN 2.3)

Scientific classification
- Kingdom: Animalia
- Phylum: Arthropoda
- Class: Malacostraca
- Order: Amphipoda
- Family: Niphargidae
- Genus: Niphargus
- Species: N. aberrans

Binomial name
- Niphargus aberrans Sket, 1972

Species of crustacean

Niphargus aberrans is a species of crustacean in the family Niphargidae. It is endemic to Slovenia.
