= Pen Park Hole =

Cave in Bristol, England

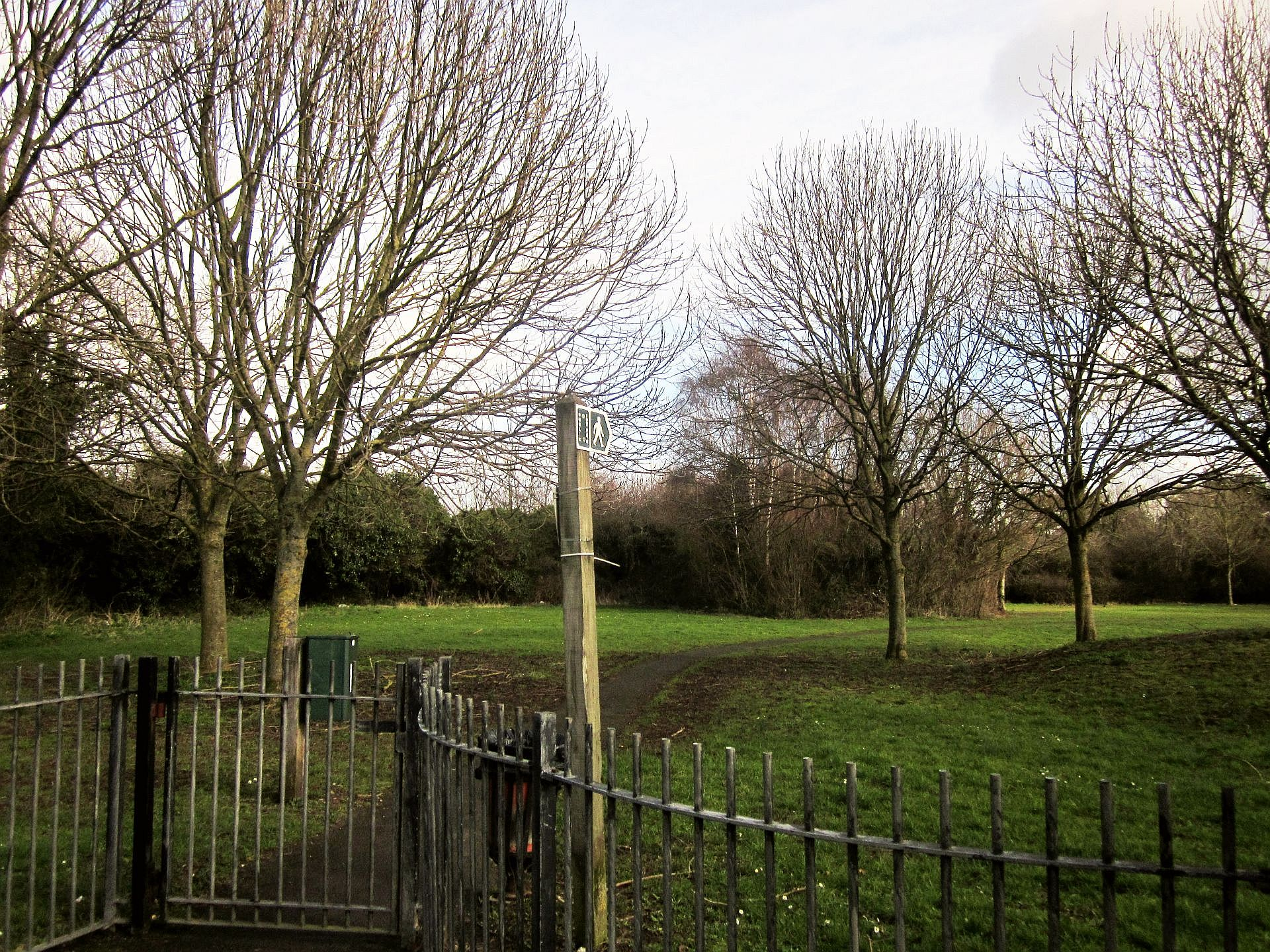
- Pen Park. The cavern is screened by trees in the background

- Location within Bristol
- Location: Southmead, Bristol, UK
- OS grid: ST 5853 7922
- Coordinates: 51°30′38″N 2°35′56″W
- Depth: 61 metres (200 ft)
- Length: 250 metres (820 ft)
- Elevation: 76 metres (249 ft)
- Discovery: 1669
- Geology: Limestone
- Access: locked, controlled by Bristol City Council
- Registry: Mendip Cave Registry

Pen Park Hole is a large cavern situated underground, on the northern edge of Bristol at the edge of Filton Golf Course, the entrance is located within Pen Park Open Space although fenced off from the public. The cavern was discovered accidentally in the 17th century and the first descent was made by Captain Sturmy in 1669. The entrance is adjacent to the Southmead and Brentry housing estates of north Bristol. Access is tightly controlled by Bristol City Council. It was scheduled as a Site of Special Scientific Interest in 2016 on account of its geological origins, and its cave invertebrate community including the cave shrimp Niphargus kochianus, which is normally known as a spring seepage or chalk aquifer species.

== Etymology ==
The name Pen Park is believed to derive from the Celtic word "penno" meaning "hill-top" similar to modern Welsh pen and the more familiar modern English word park - the hole was discovered in an enclosed space (park) and is on the high ground a mile north-east of Westbury-on-Trym. Pen Park Hole is located near the top of Pen Park Road, both the hole and the road appearing to derive their name from the eponymous park.

== History ==
The cave was discovered by quarrying in or shortly before 1669 - its discovery was considered important enough to inform King Charles II, it was at the King's request that Captain Samuel Sturmy entered the hole and underground cave.

Captain Sturmy descended into the pit on July 2, 1669. Having roped down from an old lead mine, he and a miner companion descended using 150 ft (46 m) of rope. They found a large chamber which they illuminated with candles. Exploring further they found an underground river 120 ft (37 m) wide. Seeing a passage 30 ft (9 m) above them, they had a ladder lowered which they used to ascend into the passage. Here they found what they thought was a rich mine "an abundance of strange places, the flooring being a kind of a white stone, enamelled with lead-ore, and the pendant rocks were glazed with saltpetre, which distilled upon them from above, and which time had petrified." After a few hours they ascended to the surface, but the unfortunate Captain Sturmy suffered from a severe headache for four days, developed a fever and died. This gave the hole a bad reputation and for a long time, nobody was willing to explore it further.

On 17 March 1775 Reverend Thomas Newnam of Redcliffe Church fell to his death while attempting to plumb the depth when the tree branch onto which he was holding broke. For weeks afterwards it became somewhat of a morbid tourist spot for locals, his body was recovered 17 days later. Prior to the retrieval of his body Captain James Hamilton (formerly an officer in the King of Prussia's service) is believed to have descended the hole several times to try to find Newnam's body.

In 2007 a mast for mobile phone signals was proposed at the site, however a local campaign had this resited. In 2012 a housing development was proposed. This was rejected after further surveys of the cave showing that it was the only subterranean colony of the shrimp Niphargus kochianus.

== Description ==
The cave consists of some short climbs, and a few chambers, the last of which is a very tall rift chamber with a lake that changes height by as much as 20 metres. Side passages contain impressive dogtooth spar. The cave was formed by rising geothermal water (and is one of the best examples of a hydrothermal cave in the UK or Ireland), making it far older than other caves in the area, at around 190 million years old. The main chamber is 68 metres (223 ft) high, 30 metres (98 ft) long and 15 metres (49 ft) wide. The lake within it is 15 metres (49 ft) deep but the level fluctuates widely.

The cave entrance is in a residential area and is protected by a steel plate for safety reasons. Access is under the control of Bristol City Council.
