= Niphargus podgoricensis =

Scientific classification
- Kingdom: Animalia
- Phylum: Arthropoda
- Class: Malacostraca
- Order: Amphipoda
- Family: Niphargidae
- Genus: Niphargus
- Species: N. podgoricensis

Binomial name
- Niphargus podgoricensis S. Karaman, 1934

Synonyms
- Niphargus orcinus podgoricensis

Species of crustacean

Niphargus podgoricensis is a species of crustacean in the family Niphargidae. It is endemic to Montenegro.

== Distribution ==
This species is endemic to Montenegro.
