= Niphargus wexfordensis =

Scientific classification
- Domain: Eukaryota
- Kingdom: Animalia
- Phylum: Arthropoda
- Class: Malacostraca
- Order: Amphipoda
- Family: Niphargidae
- Genus: Niphargus
- Species: N. wexfordensis

Binomial name
- Niphargus wexfordensis G. Karaman, Gledhill & Holmes, 1994

Species of freshwater amphipod

Niphargus wexfordensis is a species of amphipod of the family Niphargidae. It is endemic to Ireland and was originally described from the County Wexford. It is a subterranean species.
