= Niphargus valachicus =

Conservation status
- Vulnerable (IUCN 2.3)

Scientific classification
- Kingdom: Animalia
- Phylum: Arthropoda
- Class: Malacostraca
- Order: Amphipoda
- Family: Niphargidae
- Genus: Niphargus
- Species: N. valachicus

Binomial name
- Niphargus valachicus Dobreanu & Manolache, 1933

Species of amphipod crustacean

Niphargus valachicus is a species of crustacean in family Niphargidae. This species of crustacean is native to Bulgaria, Croatia, Hungary, Romania, Serbia and Montenegro, Slovakia, and Slovenia.
