= Niphargus sphagnicolus =

Conservation status
- Vulnerable (IUCN 2.3)

Scientific classification
- Kingdom: Animalia
- Phylum: Arthropoda
- Class: Malacostraca
- Order: Amphipoda
- Family: Niphargidae
- Genus: Niphargus
- Species: N. sphagnicolus

Binomial name
- Niphargus sphagnicolus Rejic, 1956

Species of crustacean

Niphargus sphagnicolus is a species of crustacean in family Niphargidae. It is endemic to Slovenia.
