= Niphargellus glenniei =

Scientific classification
- Domain: Eukaryota
- Kingdom: Animalia
- Phylum: Arthropoda
- Class: Malacostraca
- Order: Amphipoda
- Family: Niphargidae
- Genus: Niphargellus
- Species: N. glenniei

Binomial name
- Niphargellus glenniei (Spooner, 1952)

Synonyms
- Niphargus glenniei Spooner, 1952

Species of amphipod

Niphargellus glenniei, also known as the south-western groundwater shrimp, is a species of amphipod from within the family Niphargidae. A native of the United Kingdom, it has been placed in the UK Biodiversity Action Plan list of priority species. It is the first aquatic troglobite to be given a conservation status within the UK.

== Description ==
Niphargellus glenniei lacks pigment and is eyeless, much like other Stygofauna. It will reach sexual maturity at around 2.5–3 mm long. N. glenniei can be distinguished by a lack of spines on its telson lobes and rounded palmar angles on the organisms gnathopods.

== Distribution and habitat ==
Niphargellus glenniei is endemic to England, where it has been recorded in 143 sites within the southwest of the country. It is restricted to the counties of Cornwall, Devon and Dorset.

Niphargellus glenniei lives in freshwater habitats such as caves, aquifers, wells, springs, quarries and mines. The species has been recorded to live in alkaline limestone habitat, but also on acidic granite.
