= Niphargopsis =

Niphargopsis may refer to:

- Niphargopsis, a genus of amphipods in the family Niphargidae, synonym of Niphargus
- Niphargopsis, a genus of amphipods in the family Austroniphargidae, synonym of Austroniphargus
