= Niphargus timavi =

Conservation status
- Vulnerable (IUCN 2.3)

Scientific classification
- Kingdom: Animalia
- Phylum: Arthropoda
- Class: Malacostraca
- Order: Amphipoda
- Family: Niphargidae
- Genus: Niphargus
- Species: N. timavi

Binomial name
- Niphargus timavi S. Karaman, 1954

Species of crustacean

Niphargus timavi is a species of crustacean in family Niphargidae. It is found in Italy and Slovenia.
