= Niphargus hrabei =

Conservation status
- Vulnerable (IUCN 2.3)

Scientific classification
- Kingdom: Animalia
- Phylum: Arthropoda
- Class: Malacostraca
- Order: Amphipoda
- Family: Niphargidae
- Genus: Niphargus
- Species: N. hrabei

Binomial name
- Niphargus hrabei S. Karaman, 1932

Species of crustacean

Niphargus hrabei is a species of crustacean in family Niphargidae. It is an originally Ponto-Caspian species that was found in the River Danube in Bavaria in the mid 1990s. It is now known to occur in Austria, Croatia, Hungary, Romania, Russia, Serbia and Montenegro, Slovakia, and Ukraine. It is listed as a vulnerable species on the IUCN Red List.
