= Niphargus hadzii =

Conservation status
- Vulnerable (IUCN 2.3)

Scientific classification
- Kingdom: Animalia
- Phylum: Arthropoda
- Class: Malacostraca
- Order: Amphipoda
- Family: Niphargidae
- Genus: Niphargus
- Species: N. hadzii

Binomial name
- Niphargus hadzii Rejic, 1956

Species of crustacean

Niphargus hadzii is a species of crustacean in family Niphargidae. It is endemic to Slovenia, and is named after Slovene zoologist Jovan Hadži.
