= Troglonectes longibarbatus =

Conservation status
- Least Concern (IUCN 3.1)

Scientific classification
- Kingdom: Animalia
- Phylum: Chordata
- Class: Actinopterygii
- Division: Teleostei
- Order: Cypriniformes
- Family: Nemacheilidae
- Genus: Troglonectes
- Species: T. longibarbatus

Binomial name
- Troglonectes longibarbatus (Y. R. Chen, J. X. Yang, Sket & Aljančič, 1998)

Synonyms
- Paracobitis longibarbatus Y. R. Chen, J. X. Yang, Sket & Aljančič, 1998; Triplophysa longibarbata (Y. R. Chen, J. X. Yang, Sket & Aljančič, 1998)

Species of fish

Troglonectes longibarbatus is a species of ray-finned fish in the genus Troglonectes. This cavefish is only known from Guizhou in China.
