= Niphargus tatrensis =

Scientific classification
- Domain: Eukaryota
- Kingdom: Animalia
- Phylum: Arthropoda
- Class: Malacostraca
- Order: Amphipoda
- Family: Niphargidae
- Genus: Niphargus
- Species: N. tatrensis

Binomial name
- Niphargus tatrensis Wrześniowski, 1888

Species of crustacean

Niphargus tatrensis is a troglobitic species of crustacean in the family Niphargidae, living in the karst waters of Austria, the Czech Republic, Hungary, Poland, and Slovakia. It can be found in caves, and also in karst springs and in wells in the karstic areas.

Niphargus tatrensis was discovered in 1887 by August Wrześniowski in a well in Zakopane and described by him in 1888. The specific epithet comes from the Tatra Mountains.

== Subspecies ==
- Niphargus tatrensis aggtelekiensis Dudich
- Niphargus tatrensis hrabei S. Karaman
- Niphargus tatrensis lunzensis Schellenberg
- Niphargus tatrensis lurensis Schellenberg
- Niphargus tatrensis reyersdorfensis Schellenberg
- Niphargus tatrensis salzburgensis Schellenberg
- Niphargus tatrensis schneebergensis Schellenberg
- Niphargus tatrensis tatrensis Wrześniowski
