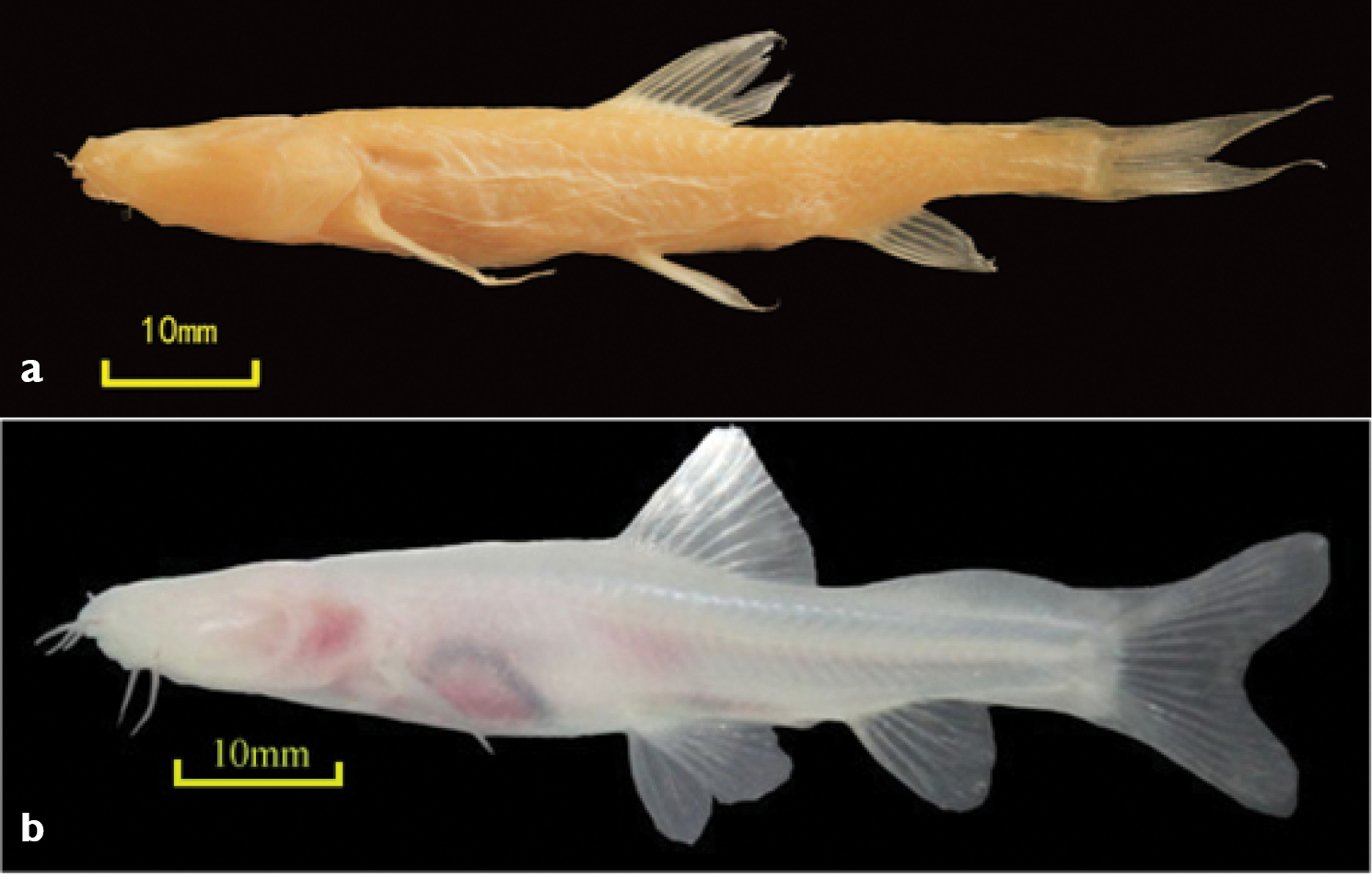
- Troglonectes daqikongensis

Scientific classification
- Kingdom: Animalia
- Phylum: Chordata
- Class: Actinopterygii
- Order: Cypriniformes
- Family: Nemacheilidae
- Genus: Troglonectes; C. G. Zhang, Y. H. Zhao & L. Tang, 2016

Type species
- Oreonectes furcocaudalis Zhu & Cao 1987

= Troglonectes =

Genus of fishes

Troglonectes is a genus of troglobitic fish in the family Nemacheilidae, native to caves of Asia. Fishbase and other authorities place these species in the genus Oreonectes.

== Species ==
These are the currently recognised species for this genus:

- Troglonectes barbatus (X. Gan, 2013)
- Troglonectes canlinensis S.-J. Li, J.-K. Ge, C.Y. Bao, L.-N. Du, F.-G. Luo & T.-X. Zou, 2023
- Troglonectes daqikongensis (H. Deng, H. Wen, N. Xiao & J. Zhou, 2016)
- Troglonectes dongganensis (Yang, 2013)
- Troglonectes donglanensis (T. Wu 2013)
- Troglonectes duanensis (J. Lan 2013)
- Troglonectes elongatus (L. Tang, Y. H. Zhao & C. G. Zhang, 2012)
- Troglonectes furcocaudalis (S. Q. Zhu & W. X. Cao, 1987)
- Troglonectes hechiensis Zhao, J.-H. Liu, L.-N. Du & F.-G. Luo, 2021
- Troglonectes huanjiangensis (J. Yang, T. Wu & J. Lan, 2011)
- Troglonectes jiarongensis (Y. Lin, C. Li, J.-K. Song 2012).
- Troglonectes lihuensis (J. Yang, T. Wu & J. Lan, 2011)
- Troglonectes lingyunensis (Liao, J.-W., D.-H. Wang and Z.-F. Luo, 1997)
- Troglonectes longibarbatus (Y.-R. Chen, J.-X. Yang, Sket & Aljancic, 1998)
- Troglonectes macrolepis (A. M. Huang, L. N. Du, X. Y. Chen & J. X. Yang, 2009)
- Troglonectes maolanensis (W.-X Li, J.-C. Ran & H.-M. Chen, 2006)
- Troglonectes microphthalmus (L. N. Du, X. Y. Chen & J. X. Yang, 2008)
- Troglonectes retrodorsalis (J. Lan, J. X. Yang & Y. R. Chen, 1995)
- Troglonectes shuilongensis H. Q. Deng, N. Xiao, X. F. Hou & J. Zhou, 2016
- Troglonectes translucens (Z. L. Zhang, Y. H. Zhao & C. G. Zhang, 2006)
