= Niphargus elegans =

Scientific classification
- Domain: Eukaryota
- Kingdom: Animalia
- Phylum: Arthropoda
- Class: Malacostraca
- Order: Amphipoda
- Family: Niphargidae
- Genus: Niphargus
- Species: N. elegans

Binomial name
- Niphargus elegans Garbini, 1894

Species of crustacean

Niphargus elegans is a species of amphipod crustaceans in the family Niphargidae. It is found in Italy.
