= Troglonectes macrolepis =

Scientific classification
- Kingdom: Animalia
- Phylum: Chordata
- Class: Actinopterygii
- Order: Cypriniformes
- Family: Nemacheilidae
- Genus: Troglonectes
- Species: T. macrolepis

Binomial name
- Troglonectes macrolepis (A. M. Huang, L. N. Du, X. Y. Chen & J. X. Yang, 2009)

Synonyms
- Oreonectes macrolepis Huang, Du, Chen & Yang, 2009

Species of fish

Troglonectes macrolepis is a species of troglobitic stone loach. This cavefish is found only in Guangxi in China. It grows to 7.6 cm (3.0 in) standard length.
