= Troglonectes translucens =

Conservation status
- Critically Endangered (IUCN 3.1)

Scientific classification
- Kingdom: Animalia
- Phylum: Chordata
- Class: Actinopterygii
- Order: Cypriniformes
- Family: Nemacheilidae
- Genus: Troglonectes
- Species: T. translucens

Binomial name
- Troglonectes translucens (Z. L. Zhang, Y. H. Zhao & C. G. Zhang, 2006)

Synonyms
- Oreonectes translucens Z. L. Zhang, Y. H. Zhao & C. G. Zhang, 2006

Species of fish

Troglonectes translucens is a species of freshwater ray-finned fish belonging to the family Nemacheilidae, the stone loaches. It inhabits the Xia'ao Cave in Guangxi Zhuang Autonomous Region, China. Described in 2006, it is considered harmless to humans. Unsexed males have a maximum length of 4.6 centimetres (1.8 in). It has 11 dorsal soft rays, 9 anal soft rays and 36 vertebrae.
