= Oreonectes polystigmus =

Scientific classification
- Kingdom: Animalia
- Phylum: Chordata
- Class: Actinopterygii
- Order: Cypriniformes
- Family: Nemacheilidae
- Genus: Oreonectes
- Species: O. polystigmus

Binomial name
- Oreonectes polystigmus L. N. Du, X. Y. Chen & J. X. Yang, 2008

Species of fish

Oreonectes polystigmus is a species of stone loach. This cavefish is found only in Guangxi in China. It grows to 5.8 cm (2.3 in) standard length.
