= Troglonectes elongatus =

Conservation status
- Data Deficient (IUCN 3.1)

Scientific classification
- Kingdom: Animalia
- Phylum: Chordata
- Class: Actinopterygii
- Order: Cypriniformes
- Family: Nemacheilidae
- Genus: Troglonectes
- Species: T. elongatus

Binomial name
- Troglonectes elongatus (L. Tang, Y. H. Zhao & C. G. Zhang, 2012)

Synonyms
- Oreonectes elongatus L. Tang, Y. H. Zhao & C. G. Zhang, 2012

Species of fish

Troglonectes elongatus is a species of freshwater ray-finned fish belonging to the family Nemacehilidae, the stone loaches. It inhabits Guangxi, China and has 9 dorsal soft rays, 7 anal soft rays and 38 or 39 vertebrae. Unsexed males have a maximum length of 7.8 centimetres (3.1 in) and it is considered harmless to humans. It has not been evaluated on the IUCN Red List and was described by Tang, Zhao and Zhang in 2012.
