= Troglonectes jiarongensis =

Conservation status
- Data Deficient (IUCN 3.1)

Scientific classification
- Kingdom: Animalia
- Phylum: Chordata
- Class: Actinopterygii
- Division: Teleostei
- Order: Cypriniformes
- Family: Nemacheilidae
- Genus: Troglonectes
- Species: T. jiarongensis

Binomial name
- Troglonectes jiarongensis (Lin, Li & Song, 2012)

Synonyms
- Triplophysa jiarongensis

Species of fish

Troglonectes jiarongensis is a species of ray-finned fish in the genus Troglonectes. It is endemic to Libo County, Guizhou Province.
