= Troglonectes barbatus =

Conservation status
- Endangered (IUCN 3.1)

Scientific classification
- Kingdom: Animalia
- Phylum: Chordata
- Class: Actinopterygii
- Order: Cypriniformes
- Family: Nemacheilidae
- Genus: Troglonectes
- Species: T. barbatus

Binomial name
- Troglonectes barbatus (X. Gan, 2013)

Synonyms
- Oreonectes barbatus Gan, 2013

Species of fish

Troglonectes barbatus is a species of freshwater ray-finned fish belonging to the family Nemacheilidae, the stone loaches. It was first formally described as Oreonectes barbatus in 2013 by Gan Xi, with its type locality given as "cave" in Lihu Town on the Dagou River), Nandan County, Guangxi in China at 25.2°N, 107.7°E, from an elevation of 484 m (1,588 ft). This is a cave fish which is found in three localities in Guangxi and Guizhou.
