= Troglonectes dongganensis =

Conservation status
- Data Deficient (IUCN 3.1)

Scientific classification
- Kingdom: Animalia
- Phylum: Chordata
- Class: Actinopterygii
- Division: Teleostei
- Order: Cypriniformes
- Family: Nemacheilidae
- Genus: Troglonectes
- Species: T. dongganensis

Binomial name
- Troglonectes dongganensis (J. Yang, 2013)

Synonyms
- Triplophysa dongganensis

Species of fish

Troglonectes dongganensis is a species of stone loach in the family Nemacheilidae. It is endemic to Guangxi, China.

== Description ==
This species reaches a standard length of 10.6 cm (4.2 in).
