= Jovan Hadži =

Slovenian zoologist of Serbian origin

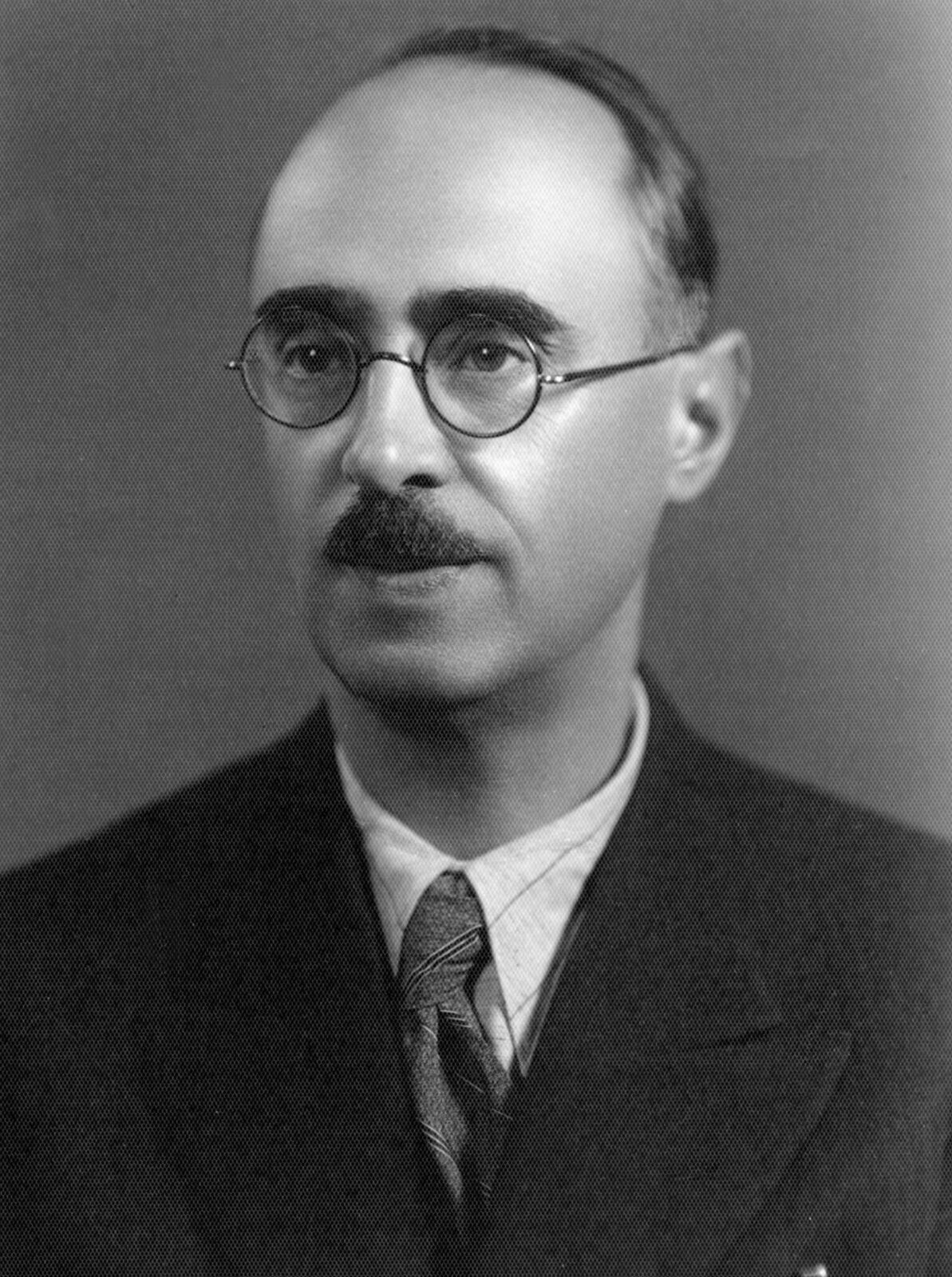
- Born: 22 November 1884; Timișoara, Kingdom of Hungary, Austria-Hungary
- Died: 11 December 1972 (aged 88); Ljubljana, SR Slovenia, SFR Yugoslavia
- Known for: "turbellarian theory", Hadži's system of animal classification
- Scientific career
- Fields: developmental biology, systematics

Jovan Hadži (Serbian Cyrillic: Јован Хаџи; 22 November 1884 – 11 December 1972) was a Slovenian zoologist of Serbian origin.

== Biography ==
Hadži was born in a Serbian family in Temišvar (today Timișoara, Romania) in what was then Austria-Hungary. He began his career in Zagreb. In 1920, he moved to Ljubljana where he became the head of zoological institute at the then established University of Ljubljana. Between 1951 and 1972, Hadži was the head of the Biological institute at Slovenian Academy of Sciences and Arts (SASA). In 1938, he became a full member of SASA.

Hadži proposed unique theories of animal evolution. He devised a system of classification in which he divided the animal kingdom into six phyla: Protozoa, Parazoa, "Ameria" (animals with no segments), "Oligomeria" (animals with few segments), "Polymeria" (animals with many segments) and Chordata. His choice of characters important for classification was generally discredited by his contemporaries, and the system was never accepted by zoologists. However, due to its simplicity, the system was widely used in science education in the former Yugoslavia. His other major theory was that of the origin of metazoa - he developed an existing hypothesis stating that the first multicellular animals resembling today's flatworms evolved from multinucleate ciliates in which cell nuclei became separated by cellular membranes. Again, the theory emphasized similarities of structure while disregarding other important characters, so it was never generally accepted.

Hadži's faunistical work focused on the invertebrate fauna of caves and mountains where he described more than a hundred new species and genera.

He was also an active cave explorer and acted as a president of the Ljubljana Cave Exploration Society (DZRJL) between 1927 and 1945.

For his contributions to zoology, Hadži received Prešeren Award in 1956. In 1969, he received the honorary doctorate by the University of Ljubljana. Several invertebrate species were named after him by other zoologists, such as Astagobius hadzii, Cyclopina hadzii, Isohypsibius hadzii, and Niphargus hadzii.
