= Miroslav Zei Award =

The Grand Miroslav Zei Award for Life Work in the Field of the Activities of the National Institute of Biology (Slovene: Velika nagrada Miroslava Zeia) is a scientific award in Slovenia awarded each year for outstanding scientific achievements in Biology. It has been bestowed since 2010 by the National Institute of Biology and includes a prize for achievements in research at the Institute and a grand award for achievements in Life and Environmental Sciences.

It is named after Miroslav Zei, the eminent Slovene biologist.

== Grand Miroslav Zei Award laureates ==
Source: National Institute of Biology

Year	Recipient	Reason
2010	Boris Sket	his achievements in the field of zoology
2011	Alenka Malej	her achievements in the field ecology of littoral waters and marine biology
2012	Jože Štirn	his achievements in the fields of life and environmental sciences
2013	Andrej Čokl	
2014	Jadran Faganeli	
2015	Radovan Komel	
2017	Tamara Lah Turnšek	
2018	Andrej Blejec	

== See also ==
- List of biology awards
