= Oreonectes weii =

Scientific classification
- Kingdom: Animalia
- Phylum: Chordata
- Class: Actinopterygii
- Order: Cypriniformes
- Family: Nemacheilidae
- Genus: Oreonectes
- Species: O. weii

Binomial name
- Oreonectes weii Luo T, Ling W-Q, Cao H-L, Zhou J, Huang G-P, 2026

Species of fish

Oreonectes weii is a species of cypriniform fish that belongs to the family Nemacheiidae. It is an endemic species being found in the Yangtze River Basin located in the Jiangxi Province of China.

The species was named in honor of Fu-Wen Wei, a conservation biologist known worldwide for his exceptional and pioneering contributions to biodiversity conservation and research.
