= Troglonectes furcocaudalis =

Conservation status
- Data Deficient (IUCN 3.1)

Scientific classification
- Kingdom: Animalia
- Phylum: Chordata
- Class: Actinopterygii
- Order: Cypriniformes
- Family: Nemacheilidae
- Genus: Troglonectes
- Species: T. furcocaudalis

Binomial name
- Troglonectes furcocaudalis (S. Q. Zhu & W. X. Cao, 1987)

Synonyms
- Oronectes furcocaudalis Zhu & Cao, 1987

Species of fish

Troglonectes furcocaudalis is an oligotrophic species of stone loach. This cavefish is found only in Guangxi, China. It grows to 5.9 cm (2.3 in) standard length.
