= Troglonectes lingyunensis =

Conservation status
- Vulnerable (IUCN 3.1)

Scientific classification
- Kingdom: Animalia
- Phylum: Chordata
- Class: Actinopterygii
- Division: Teleostei
- Order: Cypriniformes
- Family: Nemacheilidae
- Genus: Troglonectes
- Species: T. lingyunensis

Binomial name
- Troglonectes lingyunensis (Liao, Wang & Luo, 1997)

Synonyms
- Schistura lingyunensis Liao, Wang & Luo, 1997; Triplophysa lingyunensis (Liao, Wang & Luo, 1997)

Species of fish

Troglonectes lingyunensis is a troblobitic species of stone loach found in Shadong Cave, Lingyun County in Guangxi. It is scaleless and lacks pigmentation with degenerated eyes.
