= Flat-headed loach =

Conservation status
- Data Deficient (IUCN 3.1)

Scientific classification
- Domain: Eukaryota
- Kingdom: Animalia
- Phylum: Chordata
- Class: Actinopterygii
- Order: Cypriniformes
- Family: Nemacheilidae
- Genus: Oreonectes
- Species: O. platycephalus

Binomial name
- Oreonectes platycephalus Günther, 1868

Species of fish

Flat-headed loach (Oreonectes platycephalus) is a species of cyprinid fish. It is found in fast-flowing streams in southern China (including Hong Kong) and northern Vietnam. It grows to 10 cm (3.9 in) total length.
