= Oreonectes =

Scientific classification
- Kingdom: Animalia
- Phylum: Chordata
- Class: Actinopterygii
- Order: Cypriniformes
- Family: Nemacheilidae
- Genus: Oreonectes; Günther, 1868

Type species
- Oreonectes platycephalus Günther, 1868

Synonyms
- Octonema von Martens, 1868

Genus of fishes

Oreonectes is a genus of fish that belongs to the family Nemacheilidae. They are found in the rivers and caves of Asia with species possibly being troglobitic, but these are allocated to Troglonectes or Karstsinnectes.

== Species ==
These are the currently recognized species in this genus:

- Oreonectes andongensis X.-M. Luo, R.-G. Yang, L.-N. Du, F.-G. Luo, 2024
- Oreonectes daguishanensis Chen, Leng, Yang, Tang, Qiu & Zou, 2025
- Oreonectes damingshanensis J. Yu, T. Luo, C.-T.Lan, N. Xiao & X. Zhou, 2023
- Oreonectes guananensis Q. Yang, M. L. Wei, J. H. Lan & Q. Yang, 2011
- Oreonectes guidongensis Luo, Yu, Liao & Zhou, 2025
- Oreonectes guilinensis J.-Q. Huang, J. Yang, Z.-Q. Wu & Y.-H. Zhao, 2019
- Oreonectes jinxiuensis Chen, Huang, Zou, Du & Lin, 2026
- Oreonectes luochengensis J. Yang, T. J. Wu, R. F. Wei & J. X. Yang, 2011
- Oreonectes platycephalus Günther, 1868 (flat-headed loach)
- Oreonectes polystigmus L. N. Du, X. Y. Chen & J. X. Yang, 2008
- Oreonectes qinae Chen, Mo, Zhang & Du, 2025
- Oreonectes weii Luo T, Ling W-Q, Cao H-L, Zhou J, Huang G-P, 2026
- Oreonectes yuedongensis T. Luo, C.-T.Lan, N. Xiao & X. Zhou, 2024
- Oreonectes zhangi J.-H. Zhong, J. Yang & W.-C. Chen, 2024
