= Troglonectes donglanensis =

Conservation status
- Least Concern (IUCN 3.1)

Scientific classification
- Kingdom: Animalia
- Phylum: Chordata
- Class: Actinopterygii
- Division: Teleostei
- Order: Cypriniformes
- Family: Nemacheilidae
- Genus: Troglonectes
- Species: T. donglanensis

Binomial name
- Troglonectes donglanensis (Wu, 2013)

Synonyms
- Oreonectes donglanensis

Species of fish

Troglonectes donglanensis is a species of cyprinid of the genus Troglonectes. It inhabits Guangxi, China and was first described by Wu in 2013. It grows to a maximum length of 4.5 centimetres (1.8 in). It is considered harmless to humans.
