= Niphargus kochianus =

Scientific classification
- Domain: Eukaryota
- Kingdom: Animalia
- Phylum: Arthropoda
- Class: Malacostraca
- Order: Amphipoda
- Family: Niphargidae
- Genus: Niphargus
- Species: N. kochianus

Binomial name
- Niphargus kochianus Spence Bate, 1859

Species of crustacean

Niphargus kochianus is a species of crustacean in the family Niphargidae. It was first described by Bate (1859) who obtained it from a specimen collected from a pump in Ringwood, Hampshire.
