= Troglonectes retrodorsalis =

Scientific classification
- Kingdom: Animalia
- Phylum: Chordata
- Class: Actinopterygii
- Order: Cypriniformes
- Family: Nemacheilidae
- Genus: Troglonectes
- Species: T. retrodorsalis

Binomial name
- Troglonectes retrodorsalis (J. H. Lan, J. X. Yang & Y. R. Chen, 1995)

Synonyms
- Yunnanilus retrodorsalis (Lan, Yang & Chen, 1995); Oreonectes retrodorsalis Lan, Yang & Chen, 1995

Species of fish

Troglonectes retrodorsalis is a species of stone loach. This cavefish is found only in Guangxi in China. Some authorities places this species in the genus Yunnanilus or in Oreonectes. The specific name is a compound of the Latin words retro meaning back or past and dorsalis meaning "the back", referring to the placement of the dorsal fin closer to base of the caudal fin than to the tip of snout.

Troglonectes retrodorsalis grows to 3.8 cm (1.5 in) standard length.
