= Troglonectes duanensis =

Conservation status
- Data Deficient (IUCN 3.1)

Scientific classification
- Kingdom: Animalia
- Phylum: Chordata
- Class: Actinopterygii
- Division: Teleostei
- Order: Cypriniformes
- Family: Nemacheilidae
- Genus: Troglonectes
- Species: T. duanensis

Binomial name
- Troglonectes duanensis (Lan, 2013)

Synonyms
- Oreonectes duanensis

Species of fish

Troglonectes duanensis is a species of cyprinid of the genus Troglonectes. It inhabits caves in Guangxi, China. It reaches a maximum length of 7.7 centimetres (3.0 in) and it is considered harmless to humans. It was described by Lan in 2013 and has been classified on the IUCN Red List as Data Deficient.
