= Troglonectes microphthalmus =

Scientific classification
- Kingdom: Animalia
- Phylum: Chordata
- Class: Actinopterygii
- Order: Cypriniformes
- Family: Nemacheilidae
- Genus: Troglonectes
- Species: T. microphthalmus

Binomial name
- Troglonectes microphthalmus L. N. Du, X. Y. Chen & J. X. Yang, 2008

Synonyms
- Oreonectes microphthalmus (Du, Chen & Yang, 2008)

Species of fish

Troglonectes microphthalmus is a species of troglobitic stone loach. This cavefish is found only in Guangxi in China. It grows to 4.7 cm (1.9 in) standard length.
