= Oreonectes guananensis =

Scientific classification
- Kingdom: Animalia
- Phylum: Chordata
- Class: Actinopterygii
- Order: Cypriniformes
- Family: Nemacheilidae
- Genus: Oreonectes
- Species: O. guananensis

Binomial name
- Oreonectes guananensis Yang, Wei, Lan & Yang, 2011

Species of fish

Oreonectes guananensis is a species of cyprinid of the genus Oreonectes. Described in 2011, it has not been classified on the IUCN Red List. It inhabits Guangxi, China and is considered harmless to humans.
