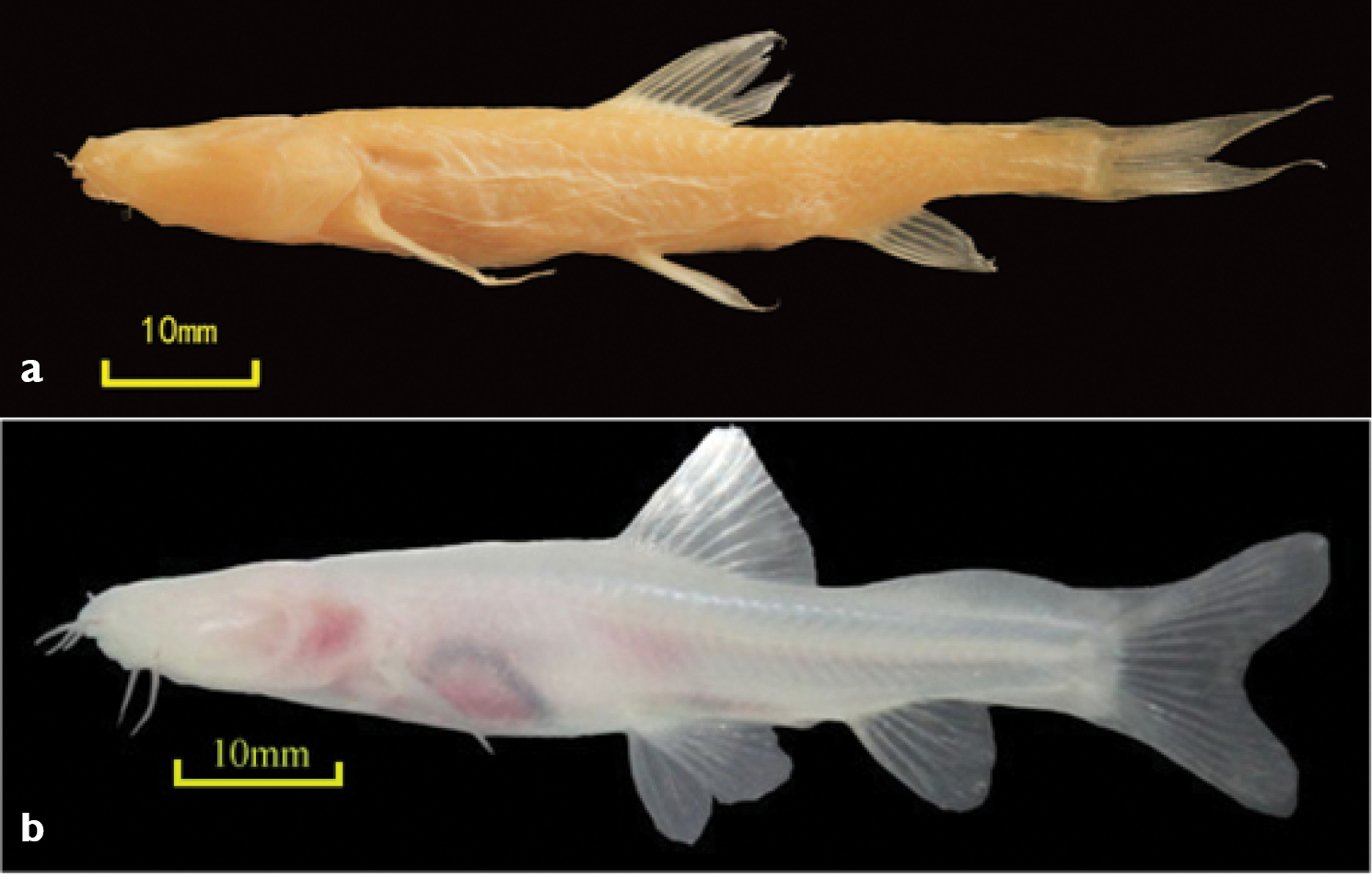
- Top, preserved specimen. Bottom, photographed alive

Conservation status
- Least Concern (IUCN 3.1)

Scientific classification
- Kingdom: Animalia
- Phylum: Chordata
- Class: Actinopterygii
- Order: Cypriniformes
- Family: Nemacheilidae
- Genus: Troglonectes
- Species: T. daqikongensis

Binomial name
- Troglonectes daqikongensis (H. Deng, H. Wen, N. Xiao & J. Zhou, 2016)

Synonyms
- Oreonectes daqikongensis Deng, Wen, Xiao & Zhu, 2016

= Troglonectes daqikongensis =

Species of fish

Troglonectes daqikongensis is a species of freshwater ray-finned fish belonging to the family Nemacheilidae, the stone loaches. This species was originally formally described as Oreonectes daqikongensis in 2016 by Huaiqing Deng, Huamei Wen, Ning Xiao and Jiang Zhou with its type locality given as a subterranean river in the Daqikong area of Libo County in Guizhou, China at 25°17'05.1"N, 107°44'54.3"E from an elevation of 488 m (1,601 ft). T. daqikongensis is known only from a single location but this location is protected and the population is stable, so the International Union for Conservation of Nature classify this species as Least Concern.
