= Carinurella =

Conservation status
- Vulnerable (IUCN 2.3)

Scientific classification
- Kingdom: Animalia
- Phylum: Arthropoda
- Class: Malacostraca
- Order: Amphipoda
- Family: Niphargidae
- Genus: Carinurella; Sket, 1971
- Species: C. paradoxa

Binomial name
- Carinurella paradoxa (Sket, 1964)

Genus of crustaceans

Carinurella paradoxa is a species of crustacean in the family Niphargidae, and the only species in the genus Carinurella. It is found in phreatic waters of the Vipava and Soča (Isonzo) rivers in Italy and Slovenia.
