= Oreonectes luochengensis =

Scientific classification
- Domain: Eukaryota
- Kingdom: Animalia
- Phylum: Chordata
- Class: Actinopterygii
- Order: Cypriniformes
- Family: Nemacheilidae
- Genus: Oreonectes
- Species: O. luochengensis

Binomial name
- Oreonectes luochengensis Yang, Wu, Wei & Yang, 2011

Species of fish

Oreonectes luochengensis is a species of cyprinid of the genus Oreonectes. It was described in 2011 and inhabits China. It is considered harmless to humans and has not been classified on the IUCN Red List.
