= Renzo Videsott =

Renzo Videsott (10 September 1904 – 4 January 1974) was an Italian alpinist and conservationist.

== Biography ==
Videsott was born in Trento, which was then part of the Austro-Hungarian monarchy. After completing his studies of veterinary medicine, he became university lecturer, professor and department head at the University of Turin. In 1929, he accomplished a legendary ascent of the Busazza in the Civetta group of the Dolomites together with a climbing companion.

During the Second World War he was a member of the clandestine organization Giustizia e Libertà and carried out unarmed missions for the Italian resistance movement. At the same time, he committed himself to the protection of endangered animals, in particular the Alpine ibex (Capra ibex).

From 1945 to 1969 he was director of the Gran Paradiso National Park. The park is located at the border to France and shares a boundary with the French Vanoise National Park; the two parks co-operate in managing the ibex population.

In 1948, he founded the Italian conservation organization Movimento Italiano per la Protezione della Natura (MIPN; today: Federazione nazionale Pro Natura) and was involved in the establishment of the International Union for the Conservation of Nature (IUCN). In addition, he represented Italy in the International Commission for the Protection of the Alps (CIPRA). He died in 1974 in Turin.
