= Kazimir Tarman =

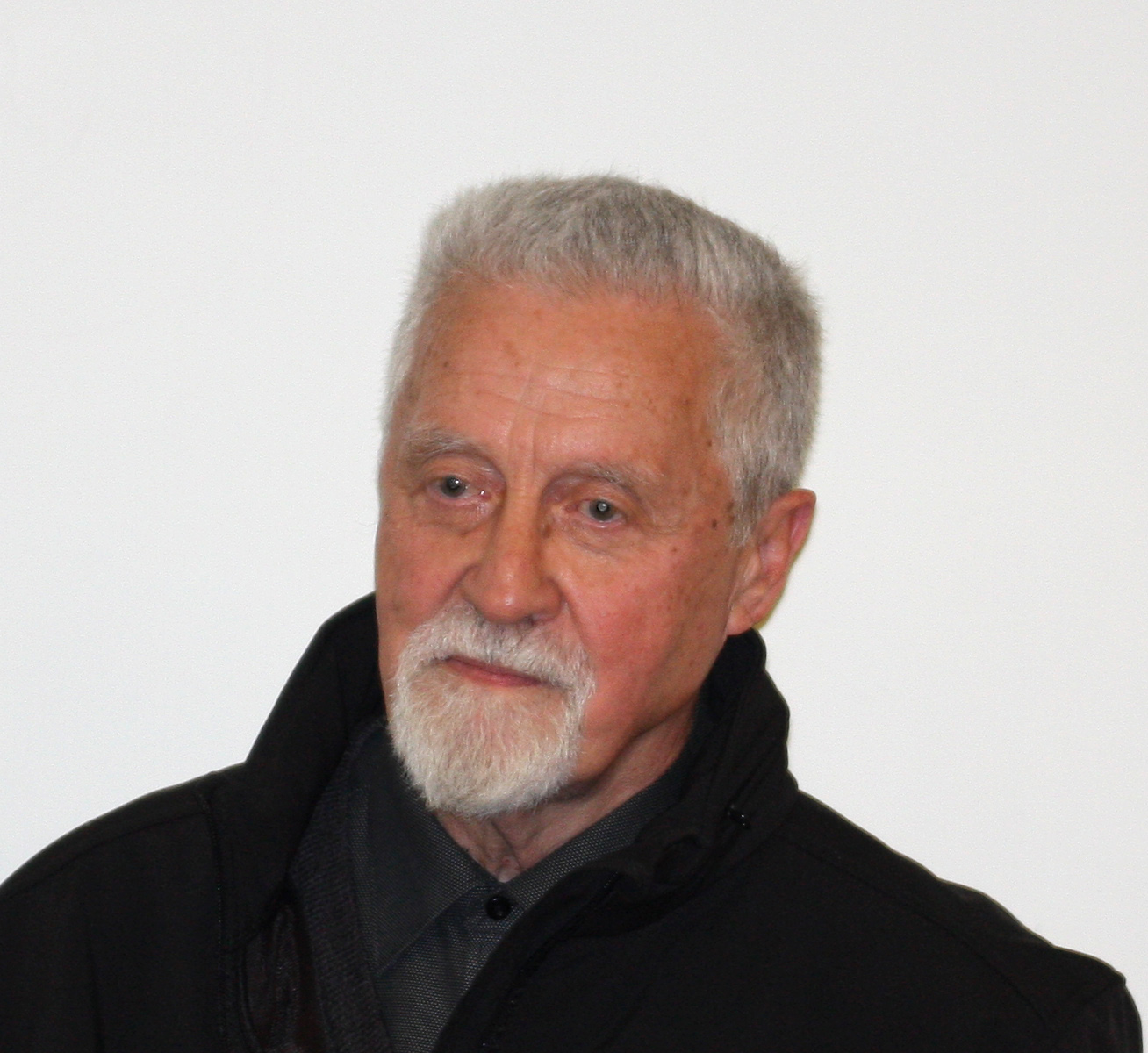
- Tarman accepting honorary membership of the National institute of Biology (2010)
- Born: 4 March 1930 (age 95); Maribor, Slovenia
- Awards: Levstik Award; 1975 for Zakaj, zato v ekologiji
- Scientific career
- Fields: zoology, pedology and ecology

Kazimir Tarman (born 4 March 1930) is a Slovene professor of Animal Ecology, author of many scientific and popular science books on ecology.

In 1975, he won the Levstik Award for his book Zakaj, zato v ekologiji (Questions and Answers in Ecology).

== Selected bibliography ==
- Povest o hrbtenici (The Story of the Spinal Cord), with Miroslav Zei, 1999
- Osnove ekologije in ekologija živali (The Basics in Ecology and the Ecology of Animals), 1992
- Naša rodna zemlja: Živali tal (Our Home Ground: Animals of the Soil), 1985
- Biologija: višje ravni organizacije : ekosistemi (Biology: Higher Organizational Levels: Ecosystems), 1982
- Zakaj, zato v ekologiji (Questions and Answers in Ecology), 1975
- Humifikacija tal, s posebnim ozirom na Kras (Humification of the Soil in particular respect to the Karst), 1967
- Živi svet prsti (The Living World of Soil), 1965
- Človek in narava (Man and Nature), 1964
