= Angela Piskernik =

Austrian-Yugoslav botanist and conservationist

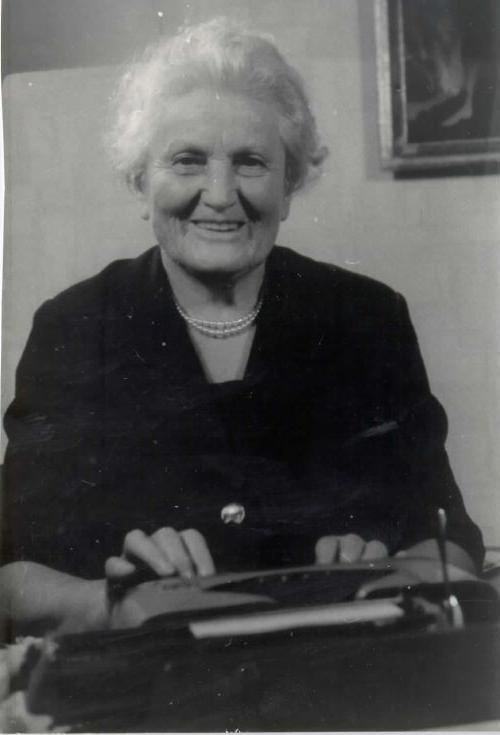
Angela Piskernik

Angela Piskernik (27 August 1886 – 23 December 1967) was an Austro-Yugoslav botanist and conservationist.

== Biography ==
Piskernik was born in Bad Eisenkappel in Southern Carinthia, which remained with Austria after the First World War, and held a Ph.D. in botany from the University of Vienna. Among her teachers was Hans Molisch. She worked for the provincial museum in Ljubljana and taught in various secondary schools.

As a nationally conscious Slovene woman, she was active in the Carinthian plebiscite and in a club of migrants. In 1943 she was imprisoned and detained in the Nazi concentration camp Ravensbrück. She is mentioned in the autobiographic novel "Angel of Oblivion" by the Austrian author Maja Haderlap.

After 1945 she became director of the Museum of Natural History in Ljubljana and worked in the conservation service. In particular, she made efforts to renew and protect the Juliana Alpine Botanical Garden and Triglav National Park. She was inspired by the Italian conservationist Renzo Videsott.

In the 1960s she headed the Yugoslav delegation of the International Commission for the Protection of the Alps (CIPRA) and proposed a transnational nature park with Austria in the Savinja Alps and Karawanks. The bilateral park was, however, never realized. Today, this area is part of the European Green Belt. She died in 1967 in Ljubljana.

In 2019, Piskernik was honoured with a commemorative stamp issued in Slovenia.

== Writings ==
- Jugoslovansko-Avstrijski visokogorski park (predlog za zavarovanje), containing a summary in English: Yugoslav-Austrian high mountain park (proposition for protection) (1965), Varstvo narave 4, pp. 7-15
