= Miroslav Zei =

- Born: 25 July 1914; Nabrežina, Austria-Hungary
- Died: 2 November 2006 (aged 92); Drniš, Croatia
- Known for: ichthyology
- Awards: Levstik Award; 1952 for Iz ribjega sveta Levstik Award; 1957 for Iz življenja sesalcev Golden Order for Merits; 2004 for his life's work
- Scientific career
- Fields: marine biology

Miroslav Zei (25 July 1914 – 2 November 2006) was a Slovene biologist, specialist in marine biology, oceanography and ichthyology.

Zei was born in Nabrežina near Trieste in 1914. He studied Biology at the University of Ljubljana from 1932 to 1936. He specialized at the Oceanographic Institute in Split from 1937 to 1941 where he was also an assistant until 1941 and then senior scientific researcher until 1948 when he was appointed professor at the University of Ljubljana. He lectured until 1962 and then joined a United Nations FAO oceanographic project and worked in Ghana, Tunisia and the Western African coast from Morocco to Zaire until 1975. He was then head of the Marine Biology Station in Piran run by the National Institute of Biology of the University of Ljubljana. He died in Drniš in Croatia in 2006.

He wrote numerous scientific texts but also a number of popular science books. He won the Levstik Award twice, in 1952 for his book Iz ribjega sveta (The World of Fish) and in 1957 for Iz življenja sesalcev (The Lives of Mammals).

The Miroslav Zei Award for outstanding scientific achievements in Biology bestowed by the Slovenian National Institute of Biology since 2010 are named after him.

== Selected published works ==
- Življenje Jadrana (Life in the Adriatic), 1947
- Iz ribjega sveta (The World of Fish), 1951
- Jadranske girice (Picarels of the Adriatic), 1951
- Morja bogati zakladi (Rich Treasures of the Sea), 1956
- Pelagic Polychaetes of the Adriatic, 1956
- Morski svet (Marine World), 1956
- Iz življenja sesalcev (The Lives of Mammals), 1957
- Dvoživke in plazilci (Amphibians and Reptiles), 1958
- Zoologija (Zoology), secondary school textbook, 1959
- Človek in ocean (Man and the Ocean), 1961
- Vretenčarji (Vertebrates), 1961
- Skrivnostna bitja globokega morja (Mysterious Creatures of the Deep Sea), 1962
- Morski ribji trg (The Sea Fish Market), 1982
- Jadranske ribe (Fish of the Adriatic), 1984
- Obrazi morja (Faces of the Sea), 1987
- Življenje živali v morju (The Life of Sea Animals), 1988
- Prvi koraki v morje (First Steps Into the Sea), 1998
- Povest o hrbtenici (The Story of the Spinal Cord), with Kazimir Tarman, 1999
