= Zgornji Tuhinj =

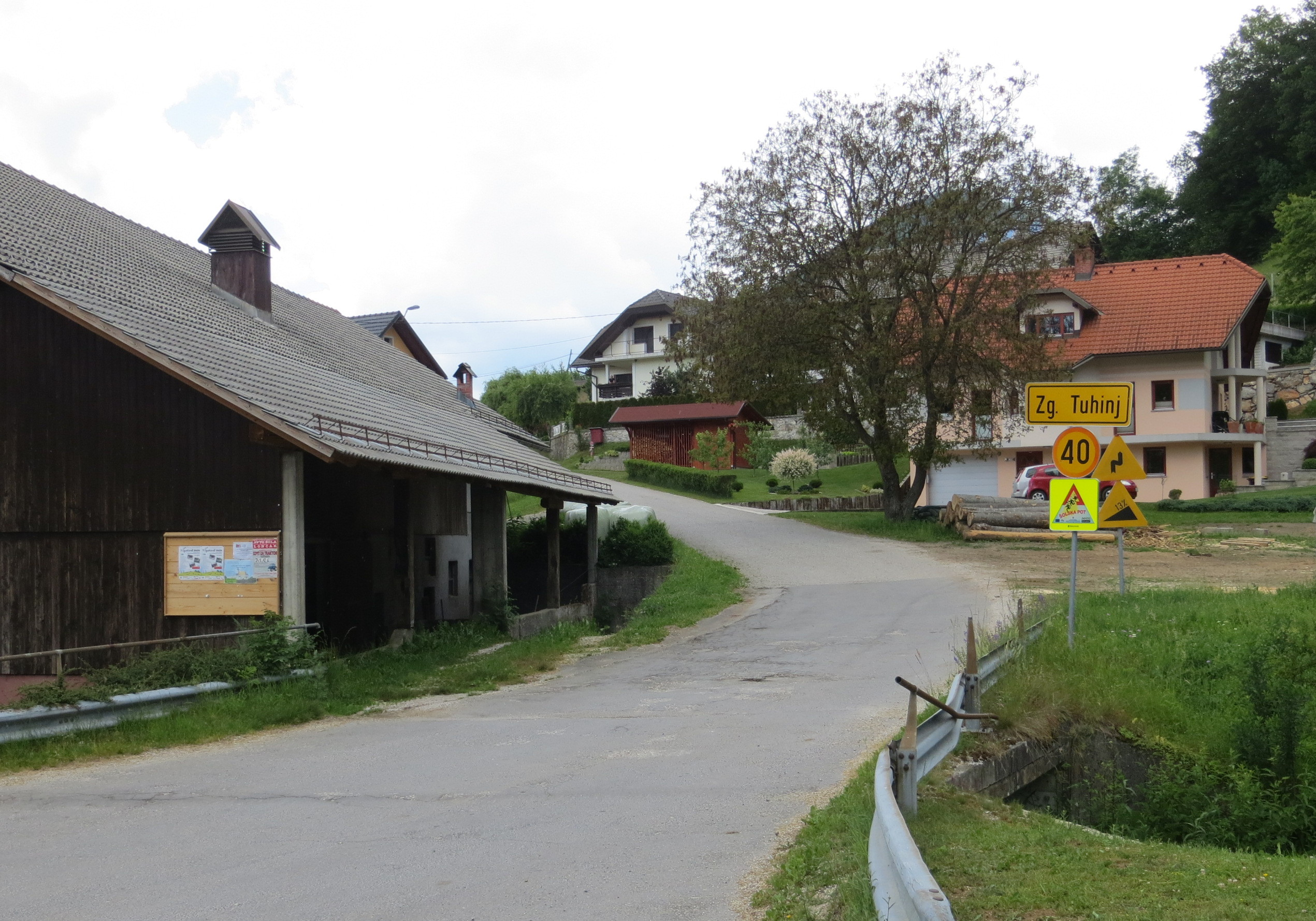

- Location in Slovenia
- Coordinates: 46°13′38.01″N 14°46′10.68″E
- Country: Slovenia
- Traditional region: Upper Carniola
- Statistical region: Central Slovenia
- Municipality: Kamnik

Area
  - Total: 7.65 km^{2} (2.95 sq mi)
- Elevation: 580.4 m (1,904 ft)

Population (2002)
  - Total: 359

Zgornji Tuhinj (pronounced [ˈzɡoːɾnji tuˈxiːnj]; German: Obertuchein) is a village in the Tuhinj Valley in the Municipality of Kamnik in the Upper Carniola region of Slovenia. It lies above the central part of the upper Tuhinj Valley.

== Name ==
The settlement was first mentioned in documents dating 1213. Zgornji Tuhinj was attested in historical sources as Tüchein in 1403, Tuchen in 1420, and Duchein in 1444, among other spellings.

== Churches ==
The church in the village is dedicated to the Assumption and, according to evidence found during its extensive renovation in 1967, was originally a Gothic structure, but has been frequently rebuilt. Its size indicates it was a pilgrimage church, on what was a busy route between Upper Carniola and Styria. The current church dates to the early 17th century with more recent changes and a belfry from the 1950s, when the previous tower collapsed. A second church, dedicated to Saint Vitus, stands on a hill above the village. This church was mentioned by Valvasor in his The Glory of the Duchy of Carniola. It is allegedly built on the site of an ancient Slavic holy site, but this is just as likely to have been a Celtic or Roman shrine.
