= Ljubljana Botanical Garden =

Botanical garden in Ljubljana

University of Ljubljana Botanical Garden
- Botanični vrt Univerze v Ljubljani
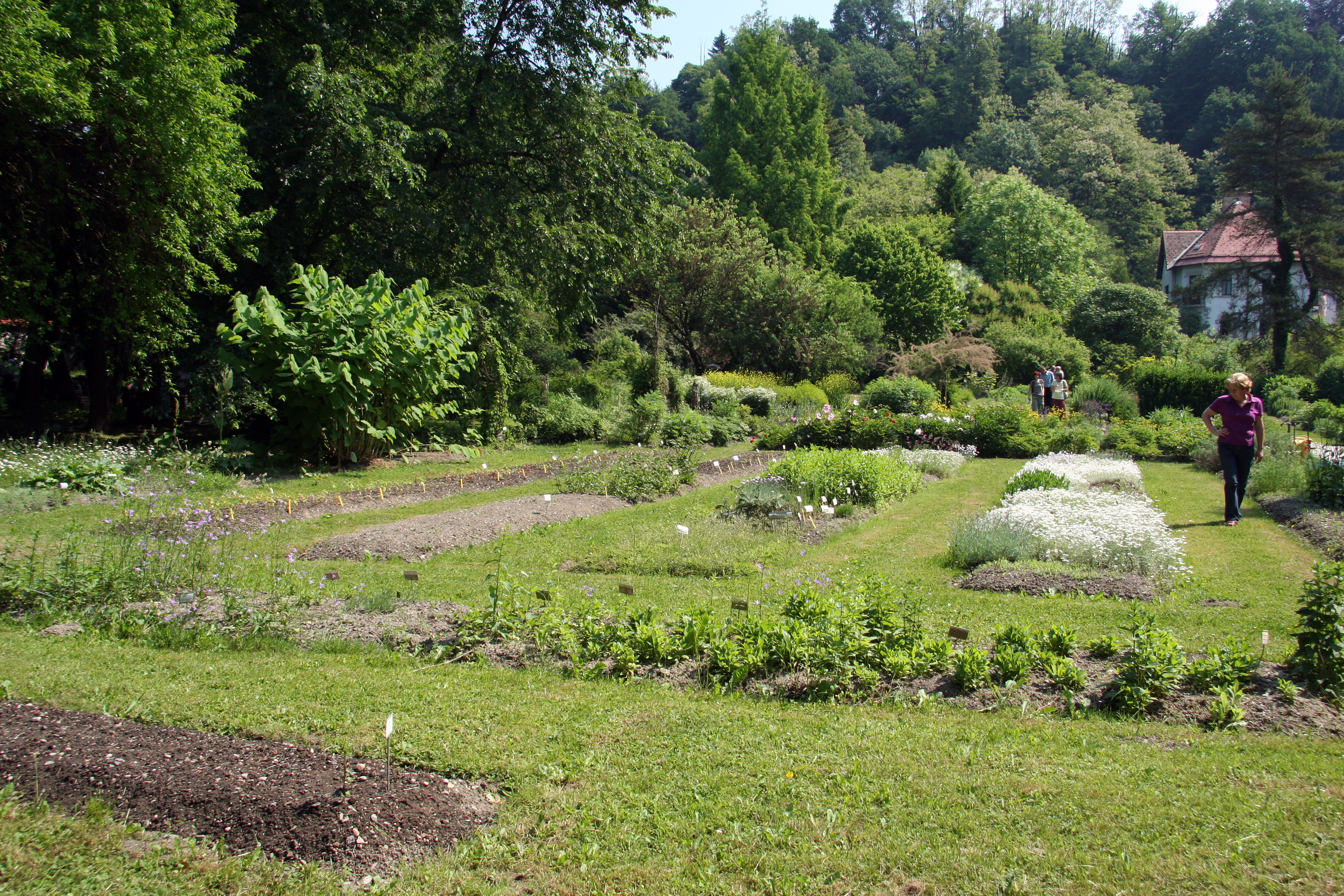
- Beds with an overview of the plant system
- Interactive map of University of Ljubljana Botanical Garden
- Type: Botanical garden
- Location: Ljubljana, Slovenia
- Coordinates: 46°02′26″N 14°30′52″E
- Area: 2 ha (4.9 acres)
- Created: 1810
- Operator: University of Ljubljana, Biotehnical faculty
- Open: all year
- Website: www.botanic-gardens-ljubljana.com

The Ljubljana Botanical Garden (Slovene: Ljubljanski botanični vrt), officially the University of Ljubljana Botanical Garden (Botanični vrt Univerze v Ljubljani), is the central Slovenian botanical garden, the oldest botanical garden in Southeastern Europe, and one of the oldest cultural, scientific, and educational organisations in Slovenia. Its headquarters are located in the Rudnik District of Ljubljana, the Slovenian capital, along the Gruber Canal. The garden started operating under the leadership of Franc Hladnik in 1810. The institution is a member of the international network Botanic Gardens Conservation International and cooperates with more than 270 botanical gardens all across the world. Of over 4,500 plant species and subspecies that grow on 2 hectares (4.9 acres), roughly a third is endemic to Slovenia, whereas the rest originate from other European places and other continents.
