= Ernest Mayer =

Slovenian botanist (1920–2009)

Ernest Mayer (born 10 November 1920 in Zgornji Tuhinj, died 17 March 2009) was a Slovenian botanist

He studied Biology at the University of Ljubljana and at the University of Vienna. From September 1944 to December 1945, he was in the Yugoslav partisans and the Yugoslav People's Army. In 1947, he finished his studies in Vienna and graduated in botany as the main subject.

In 1947, he was appointed assistant trainee at the Botanical Institute of the University of Ljubljana, in due course becoming assistant, senior assistant, and assistant professor of botany. In 1956, he became an associate professor in the Natural Sciences and Mathematics Faculty, then a professor of botany at the Biotechnical Faculty in Ljubljana, the job he held until 1978. Then, he transferred to the Jovan Hadži Institute of Biology, Slovenian Academy of Sciences and Arts where he was a senior scientist until his retirement in 1991.

His work primarily focussed on phytogeographic, morphological and taxonomic identification of higher plants that grow on the territory of the former Yugoslavia and the rest of the Balkan Peninsula, with an emphasis on endemics and polymorphism. He was author or co-author of over 100 scientific papers.

He was a member of many Yugoslav national and international societies and committees. He was the Regional Adviser on Yugoslavia for the Flora Europaea project up to 1992, and then assistant consultant for its continuation, the Helsinki-based Atlas Florae Europaeae. He became an associate member of the Slovenian Academy of Sciences and Arts in 1974, and a full member in 1983. From 1993, he was a regular member of the European Academy of Sciences and Arts. For his contribution to science, he received the Jesenko Prize of the Biotechnical Faculty (1979) and the Kidrič Award for lifetime achievement (1986).

== Book translated into English ==
- Mayer, Ernest (1963). Doprinos k poznavanju flore Zahodnih Julijskih Alp [A contribution to the knowledge of the flora of the Western Julian Alps]. U.S. Dept. of Commerce. Office of Technical Services.
