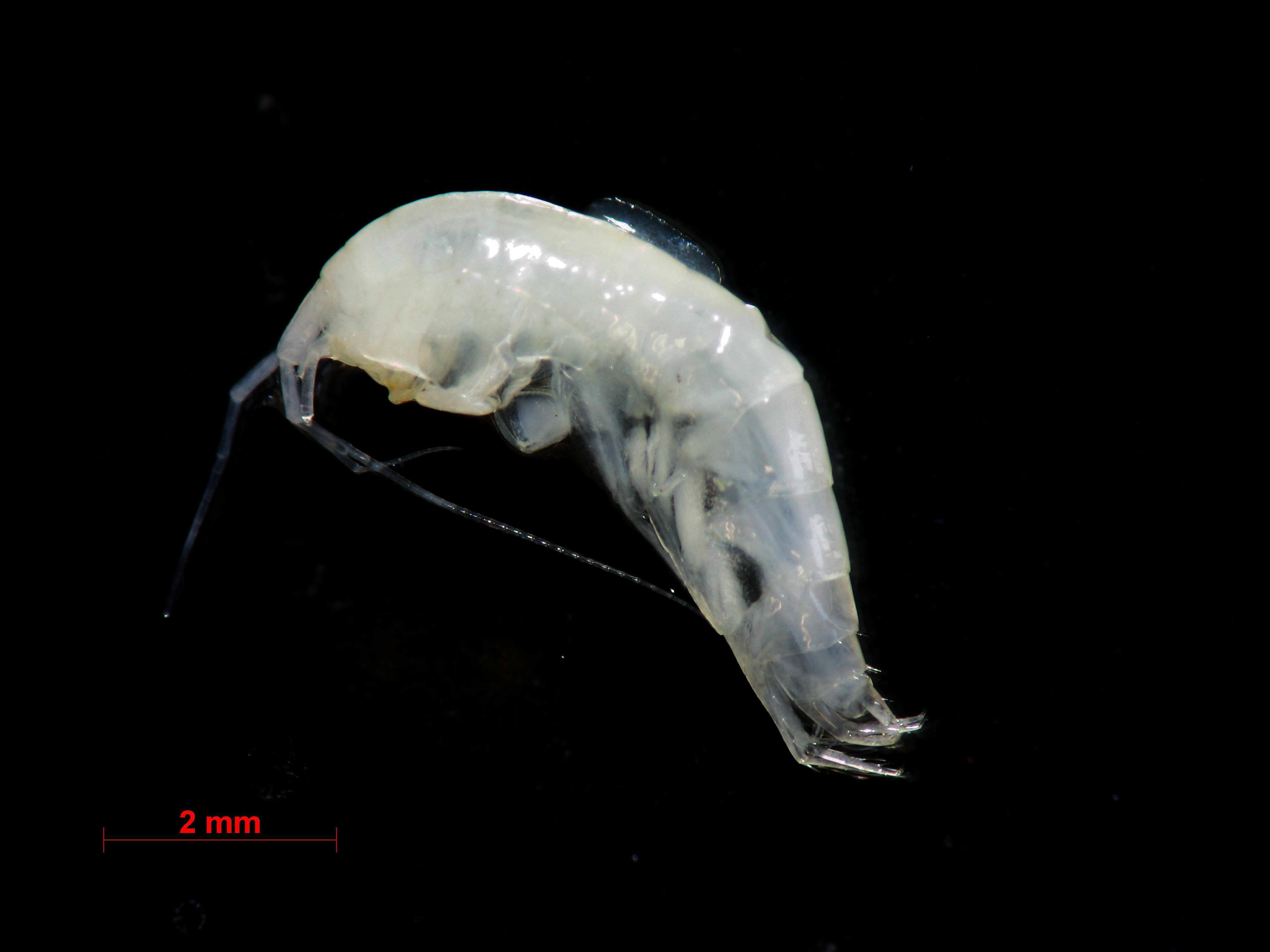
- Niphargus ictus Grotte di Frasassi

Scientific classification
- Kingdom: Animalia
- Phylum: Arthropoda
- Clade: Pancrustacea
- Class: Malacostraca
- Order: Amphipoda
- Family: Niphargidae
- Genus: Niphargus; Schiødte, 1847

Type species
- Niphargus stygius Schiødte, 1847

Species
- Over 300; see text

= Niphargus =

Genus of crustaceans

Niphargus is by far the largest genus of its family, the Niphargidae, and the largest of all freshwater amphipod genera.

Usually, these animals inhabit caves or groundwater. They occur in western Eurasia, in regions that were not covered by the Pleistocene ice sheets. They are found throughout most of Europe with the notable exception of the Nordics and they are also largely missing from Iberia. The genus extends into Asia as far as the Arabian Peninsula and Iran. In their main range – the central Mediterranean region through Central and Eastern Europe to Ukraine – they are among the most significant organisms inhabiting the groundwater. In the Dinaric Alps alone there are at least 45 species. There are also six species in the British Isles (the northernmost Niphargus): N. aquilex, N. fontanus, N. glenniei and N. kochianus of Great Britain, and N. irlandicus and N. wexfordensis of Ireland. Although the individual species often have very small ranges and only live at a narrow water temperature range, the genus includes both species of cold and relatively warm places, taken to the extreme in N. thermalis from thermal waters.

Niphargus are extremely variable in their appearance (more so than even some amphipod families), but are whitish and completely lack eyes. They are fairly small, ranging from about 2 mm (0.08 in) in length in the smallest species to about 35 mm (1.4 in) in the largest. At least some of the species are highly resistant to starvation and able to survive for more than 200 days without food.

== Species ==
The taxonomy of Niphargus is highly complex. The genus contains the following species:

- Niphargus abchasicus Martynov, 1932
- Niphargus aberrans Sket, 1972
- Niphargus ablaskiri Birstein, 1940
- Niphargus abricossovi Birstein, 1932
- Niphargus adbiptus G. Karaman, 1973
- Niphargus adei S. Karaman, 1934
- Niphargus affinis Dobreanu, Manolache & Puscariu, 1953
- Niphargus aggtelekiensis Dudich, 1932
- Niphargus alasonius Derzhavin, 1945
- Niphargus alatus G. Karaman, 1973
- Niphargus alpinus G. Karaman & Ruffo, 1989
- Niphargus altagahizi Alouf, 1973
- Niphargus alutensis Dancau, 1971
- Niphargus ambulator G. Karaman, 1975
- Niphargus anatolicus S. Karaman, 1950
- Niphargus andropus Schellenberg, 1940
- Niphargus angelieri Ruffo, 1954
- Niphargus anticolanus d’Ancona, 1934
- Niphargus apuanus Ruffo, 1936
- Niphargus aquilex Schioedte, 1855
- Niphargus arbiter G. Karaman, 1985
- Niphargus arcanus G. Karaman, 1988
- Niphargus armatus G. Karaman, 1985
- Niphargus asper G. Karaman, 1972
- Niphargus auerbachi Schellenberg, 1934
- Niphargus aulicus G. S. Karaman, 1991
- Niphargus bajuvaricus Schellenberg, 1932
- Niphargus balazuci Schellenberg, 1951
- Niphargus balcanicus Absolon, 1927
- Niphargus baloghi Dudich, 1940
- Niphargus banaticus Dobreanu & Manolache, 1936
- Niphargus banjanus S. Karaman, 1943
- Niphargus barbatus Karaman, 1985
- Niphargus bihorensis Schellenberg, 1940
- Niphargus bilecanus S. Karaman, 1953
- Niphargus biljanae Karaman, 1998
- Niphargus birsteini Dedyu, 1963
- Niphargus bitoljensis S. Karaman, 1943
- Niphargus bodoni Karaman, 1985
- Niphargus borkanus S. Karaman, 1960
- Niphargus borutzkyi Birstein, 1933
- Niphargus boskovici S. Karaman, 1952
- Niphargus bosniacus S. Karaman, 1943
- Niphargus boulangei Wichers, 1964
- Niphargus brachytelson S. Karaman, 1952
- Niphargus brevicuspis Schellenberg, 1937
- Niphargus brevirostris Sket, 1971
- Niphargus brixianus Ruffo, 1937
- Niphargus bulgaricus Andreev, 2001
- Niphargus bureschi Fage, 1926
- Niphargus burgundus Graf & Straskraba, 1967
- Niphargus buturovici S. Karaman, 1958
- Niphargus caelestis G. Karaman, 1982
- Niphargus canui G. Karaman, 1976
- Niphargus carcerarius G. Karaman, 1989
- Niphargus carniolicus Sket, 1960
- Niphargus carpathicus Dobreanu & Manolache, 1939
- Niphargus carpathorossicus Straskraba, 1957
- Niphargus carsicus Straskraba, 1956
- Niphargus casimiriensis Skalski, 1980
- Niphargus castellanus S. Karaman, 1960
- Niphargus catalogus G. S. Karaman, 1995
- Niphargus cavernicolus Dobreanu & Manolache, 1957
- Niphargus cepelarensis S. Karaman & G. Karaman, 1959
- Niphargus ciliatus Chevreux, 1906
- Niphargus cismontanus Margalef, 1952
- Niphargus corinae Dedyu, 1963
- Niphargus corniculanus Iannilli&Vigna-Taglianti, 2005
- Niphargus corsicanus Schellenberg, 1950
- Niphargus costozzae Schellenberg, 1935
- Niphargus croaticus Jurinac, 1888
- Niphargus cubanicus Birstein, 1954
- Niphargus cvijici S. Karaman, 1950
- Niphargus d’anconai Benedetti, 1942
- Niphargus dabarensis Fišer, Trontelj & Sket, 2006
- Niphargus dacicus Dancau, 1963
- Niphargus dalmatinus Schaferna, 1922
- Niphargus danconai Benedetti, 1942
- Niphargus danconai S. Karaman, 1954
- Niphargus danielopoli Karaman, 1994
- Niphargus debilis Ruffo, 1936
- Niphargus decui G. Karaman & Sarbu, 1995
- Niphargus deelemanae G. Karaman, 1973
- Niphargus delamarei Ruffo, 1954
- Niphargus derzhavini Birstein, 1952
- Niphargus dimorphopus Stock & Gledhill, 1977
- Niphargus dimorphus Birstein, 1961
- Niphargus dissonus G. Karaman, 1984
- Niphargus dobati Sket, 1999
- Niphargus dobrogicus Dancau, 1964
- Niphargus dojranensis G. Karaman, 1960
- Niphargus dolenianesis Lorenzi, 1898
- Niphargus dolichopus Fišer, Trontelj & Sket, 2006
- Niphargus dubius Dobreanu & Manolache
- Niphargus dudichi Hanko, 1924
- Niphargus duplus G. Karaman, 1976
- Niphargus echion G. Karaman & Gottstein Matočec, 2006
- Niphargus effossus Dudich, 1943
- Niphargus elegans Garbini, 1894
- Niphargus enslini S. Karaman, 1932
- Niphargus eugeniae Derzhavin, 1945
- Niphargus factor Sket & G. Karaman, 1990
- Niphargus fontanus Bate, 1859
- Niphargus fongi Fišer & Zagmajster, 2009
- Niphargus fontophilus S. Karaman, 1943
- Niphargus foreli Humbert, 1877
- Niphargus forroi Karaman, 1986
- Niphargus galenae Derzhavin, 1939
- Niphargus gallicus Schellenberg, 1935
- Niphargus galvagnii Ruffo, 1953
- Niphargus gebhardti Schellenberg, 1934
- Niphargus georgievi S. Karaman & G. Karaman, 1959
- Niphargus gineti Bou, 1965
- Niphargus glontii Behning, 1940
- Niphargus graecus S. Karaman, 1934
- Niphargus grandii Ruffo, 1937
- † Niphargus groehni Coleman & Myers, 2001
- Niphargus gurjanovae Birstein, 1941
- Niphargus hadzii Rejic, 1956
- Niphargus hebereri Schellenberg, 1933
- Niphargus hercegovinensis S. Karaman, 1950
- Niphargus hoverlicus Dedyu, 1963
- Niphargus hrabei S. Karaman, 1932
- Niphargus hungaricus Mehely, 1937
- Niphargus hvarensis S. Karaman, 1952
- Niphargus ictus G. Karaman, 1985
- Niphargus illidzensis Schaferna, 1922
- Niphargus incertus Dobreanu, Manolache & Puscariu, 1951
- Niphargus inclinatus G. Karaman, 1973
- Niphargus inermis Birstein, 1940
- Niphargus iniochus Birstein, 1941
- Niphargus inopinatus Schellenberg, 1932
- Niphargus inornatus Derzhavin, 1945
- Niphargus irlandicus Schellenberg, 1932
- Niphargus italicus G. Karaman, 1976
- Niphargus itus G. Karaman, 1986
- Niphargus ivokaramani G. Karaman, 1994
- Niphargus jadranko Sket & G. Karaman, 1990
- Niphargus jalzici G. Karaman, 1989
- Niphargus jaroschenkoi Dedyu, 1963
- Niphargus jovanovici S. Karaman, 1931
- Niphargus jugoslavicus G. Karaman, 1982
- Niphargus jurinaci S. Karaman, 1950
- Niphargus karamani Schellenberg, 1935
- Niphargus kenki S. Karaman, 1952
- Niphargus kieferi Schellenberg, 1936
- Niphargus kirgizi Fišer, Çamur-Elipek & Özbek, 2009
- Niphargus kochianus Bate, 1859
- Niphargus kolombatovici S. Karaman, 1950
- Niphargus komareki S. Karaman, 1932
- Niphargus korosensis Dudich, 1943
- Niphargus kosanini S. Karaman, 1943
- Niphargus kragujevensis S. Karaman, 1950
- Niphargus krameri Schellenberg, 1935
- Niphargus kurdus Derzhavin, 1945
- Niphargus kusceri S. Karaman, 1950
- Niphargus labacensis Sket, 1956
- Niphargus ladmiraulti Chevreux, 1901
- Niphargus laisi Schellenberg, 1936
- Niphargus laticaudatus Schellenberg, 1940
- Niphargus latimanus Birstein, 1952
- Niphargus lattingerae G. Karaman, 1983
- Niphargus leopoliensis Jaworowski, 1893
- Niphargus lessiniensis Stoch, 1998
- Niphargus liburnicus G. Karaman & Sket, 1989
- Niphargus likanus S. Karaman, 1952
- Niphargus lindbergi S. Karaman, 1956
- Niphargus longicaudatus A. Costa, 1851
- Niphargus longidactylus Ruffo, 1937
- Niphargus longiflagellum S. Karaman, 1950
- Niphargus lori Derzhavin, 1945
- Niphargus lourensis Fišer, Trontelj & Sket, 2006
- Niphargus lunaris G. Karaman, 1985
- Niphargus macedonicus S. Karaman, 1929
- Niphargus magnus Birstein, 1940
- Niphargus maximus S. Karaman, 1929
- Niphargus mediodanubilais Dudich, 1941
- Niphargus medvednicae S. Karaman, 1950
- Niphargus melticensis Dancau & Andreev, 1973
- Niphargus meridionalis Dobreanu & Manolache, 1942
- Niphargus messanai G. Karaman, 1989
- Niphargus microcerberus Sket, 1972
- Niphargus miljeticus Straškraba, 1959
- Niphargus minor Sket, 1956
- Niphargus moldavicus Dobreanu, Manolache & Puscariu, 1953
- Niphargus molnari Mehely, 1927
- Niphargus montellianus Stoch, 1998
- Niphargus montenigrinus G. Karaman, 1962
- Niphargus multipennatus Sket, 1956
- Niphargus nadarini Alouf, 1972
- Niphargus nicaensis Isnard, 1916
- Niphargus novomestanus S. Karaman, 1952
- Niphargus numerus G. Karaman & Sket, 1990
- Niphargus occultus G. Karaman, 1993-94
- Niphargus ohridanus S. Karaman, 1929
- Niphargus orcinus Joseph, 1869
- Niphargus orientalis S. Karaman, 1950
- Niphargus osogovensis S. Karaman, 1959
- Niphargus otharicus Birstein, 1952
- Niphargus pachypus Schellenberg, 1933
- Niphargus pachytelson Sket, 1960
- Niphargus pancici S. Karaman, 1929
- Niphargus pannonicus S. Karaman, 1950
- Niphargus parapupetta G. Karaman, 1984
- Niphargus parenzani Ruffo & Vigna–Taglianti, 1968
- Niphargus parvus S. Karaman, 1943
- Niphargus pasquinii Vigna-Taglianti, 1966
- Niphargus pater Mehely, 1941
- Niphargus patrizii Ruffo & Vigna–Taglianti, 1968
- Niphargus pavicevici G. Karaman, 1976
- Niphargus pecarensis S. Karaman & G. Karaman, 1959
- Niphargus pectencoronatae Sket & G. Karaman, 1990
- Niphargus pectinicauda Sket, 1971
- Niphargus pedemontanus Ruffo, 1937
- Niphargus pellagonicus S. Karaman, 1943
- Niphargus pescei G. Karaman, 1984
- Niphargus petkovskii G. Karaman, 1963
- Niphargus petrosani Dobreanu & Manolache, 1933
- Niphargus phreaticolus Motas, Dobreanu & Manolache, 1948
- Niphargus plateaui Chevreux, 1901
- Niphargus pliginskii Martynov, 1930
- Niphargus podgoricensis S. Karaman, 1934
- Niphargus podpecanus S. Karaman, 1952
- Niphargus poianoi G. Karaman, 1988
- Niphargus polonicus Schellenberg, 1936
- Niphargus poloninicus Straškraba, 1957
- Niphargus polymorphus Fišer, Trontelj & Sket, 2006
- Niphargus ponoricus Dancau, 1963
- Niphargus potamophilus Birstein, 1954
- Niphargus pretneri Sket, 1959
- Niphargus pseudocaspius G. Karaman, 1982
- Niphargus pseudokochianus Dobreanu, Manolache & Puscariu, 1953
- Niphargus pseudolatimanus Birstein, 1952
- Niphargus pulevici G. Karaman, 1967
- Niphargus pupetta Sket, 1962
- Niphargus puteanus (C. L. Koch, 1836)
- Niphargus rajecensis Schellenberg, 1938
- Niphargus ravanicanus S. Karaman, 1943
- Niphargus redenseki Sket, 1959
- Niphargus rejici Sket, 1958
- Niphargus remus G. Karaman, 1992
- Niphargus remyi S. Karaman, 1934
- Niphargus renei Karaman, 1986
- Niphargus rhenorhodanensis Schellenberg, 1937
- Niphargus rhodi S. Karaman, 1950
- Niphargus robustus Chevreux, 1901
- Niphargus romanicus Dobreanu & Manolache, 1942
- Niphargus romuleus Vigna-Taglianti, 1968
- Niphargus rostratus Sket, 1971
- Niphargus rucneri G. Karaman, 1962
- Niphargus ruffoi G. Karaman, 1976
- Niphargus salonitanus S. Karaman, 1950
- Niphargus sanctinaumi S. Karaman, 1943
- Niphargus schellenbergi S. Karaman, 1932
- Niphargus schusteri G. Karaman, 1991
- Niphargus scopicauda Fišer, Coleman, Zagmajster, Zwittnig, Gerecke & Sket, 2010
- Niphargus serbicus S. Karaman, 1960
- Niphargus sertaci Fišer, Çamur-Elipek & Özbek, 2009
- Niphargus setiferus Schellenberg, 1937
- Niphargus sibillinianus G. Karaman, 1984
- Niphargus similis G. Karaman & Ruffo, 1989
- Niphargus sketi G. Karaman, 1966
- Niphargus skopljensis S. Karaman, 1929
- Niphargus slovenicus S. Karaman, 1932
- Niphargus smederevanus S. Karaman, 1950
- Niphargus smirnovi Birstein, 1952
- Niphargus sodalis G. Karaman, 1984
- Niphargus somesensis Motas, Dobreanu & Manolache, 1948
- Niphargus speziae Schellenberg, 1936
- Niphargus sphagnicolus Rejic, 1956
- Niphargus spinulifemur S. Karaman, 1954
- Niphargus spoeckeri Schellenberg, 1933
- Niphargus stadleri S. Karaman, 1932
- Niphargus stankoi G. Karaman, 1974
- Niphargus stebbingi Cecchini
- Niphargus stefanellii Ruffo & Vigna-Taglianti, 1968
- Niphargus stenopus Sket, 1960
- Niphargus steueri Schellenberg, 1935
- Niphargus stochi G. Karaman, 1994
- Niphargus strouhali Schellenberg, 1933
- Niphargus stygius Schiodte, 1847 – type species
- Niphargus stygocharis Dudich, 1943
- Niphargus submersus Derzhavin, 1945
- Niphargus subtypicus Sket, 1960
- Niphargus talikadzei Giliarov, Lagidze, Levushkin & Talikadze, 1974
- Niphargus tamaninii Ruffo, 1953
- Niphargus tatrensis Wrzesniowsky, 1888
- Niphargus tauri Schellenberg, 1933
- Niphargus tauricus Birstein, 1964
- Niphargus tenuicaudatus Schellenberg, 1940
- Niphargus thermalis Dudich, 1941
- Niphargus thienemanni Schellenberg, 1934
- Niphargus thuringius Schellenberg, 1934
- Niphargus timavi S. Karaman, 1954
- Niphargus toplicensis Andreev, 1966
- Niphargus transitivus Sket, 1971
- Niphargus transsylvanicus Schellenberg, 1934
- Niphargus tridentinus Stoch, 1998
- Niphargus trullipes Sket, 1958
- Niphargus vadimi Birstein, 1961
- Niphargus valachicus Dobreanu & Manolache, 1933
- Niphargus vandeli Barbe, 1961
- Niphargus variabilis Dobreanu, Manolache & Puscariu, 1953
- Niphargus velesensis S. Karaman, 1943
- Niphargus versluysi S. Karaman, 1950
- Niphargus vinodolensis Fišer, Sket & Stoch, 2006
- Niphargus virei Chevreux, 1896
- Niphargus vjeternicensis S. Karaman, 1932
- Niphargus vlkanovi S. Karaman & G. Karaman, 1959
- Niphargus vodnensis S. Karaman, 1943
- Niphargus vornatscheri Schellenberg, 1934
- Niphargus vranjinae G. Karaman, 1967
- Niphargus vulgaris G. Karaman, 1968
- Niphargus wexfordensis Karaman, Gledhill & Holmes, 1994
- Niphargus wolfi Schellenberg, 1933
- Niphargus zagrebensis S. Karaman, 1950
- Niphargus zavalanus S. Karaman, 1950
- Niphargus zorae G. Karaman, 1967
