= Franz Hladnik =

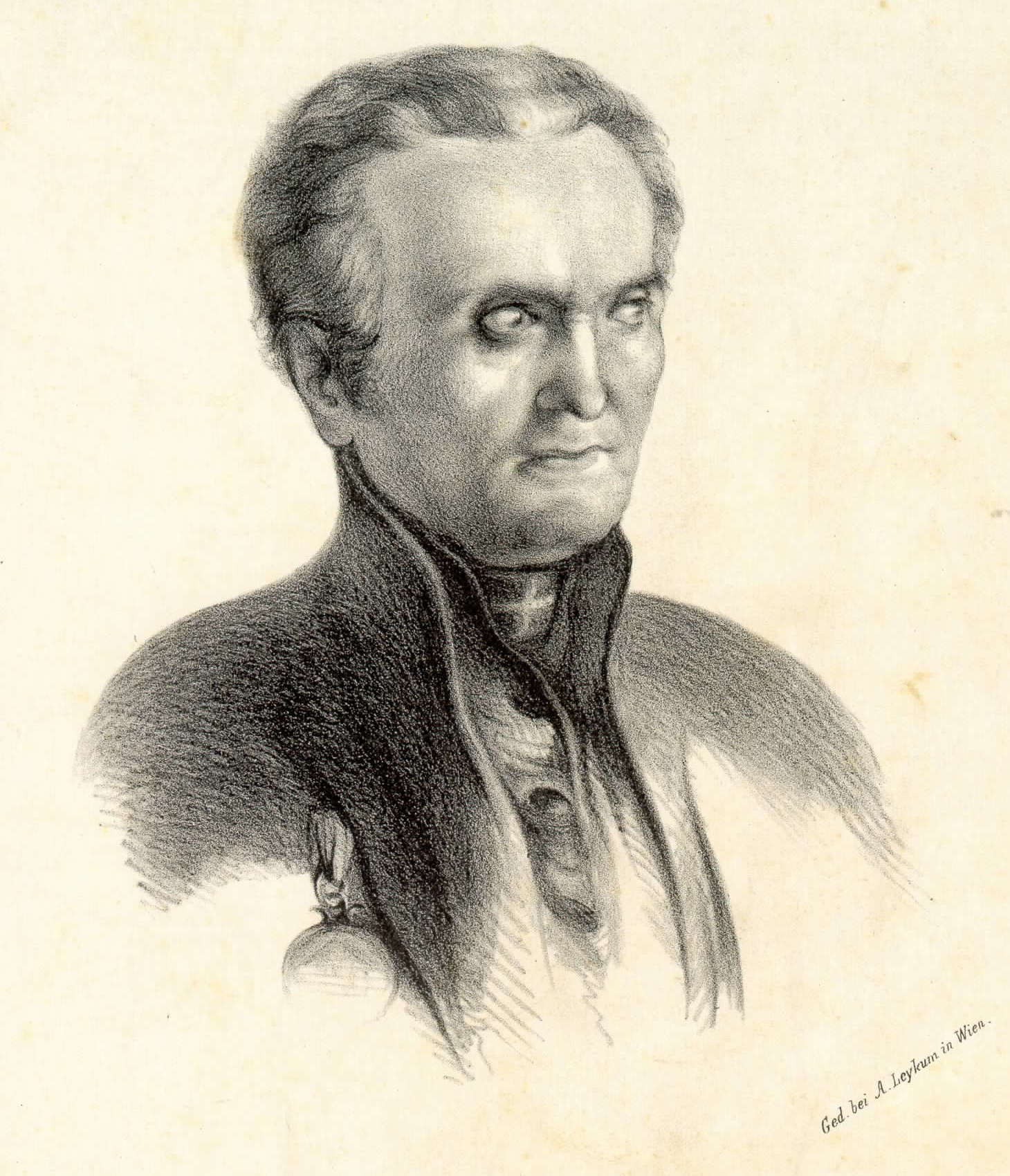
Franz de Paula Hladnik

Franz de Paula Hladnik (29 March 1773 – 25 November 1844) was a Carniolan botanist and schoolmaster.

He was born in Idria, Carniola, then in Austria (now Slovenia), the son of a mining official. He studied philosophy and theology and became a priest in 1796. His weak health prevented him from undertaking parish duties, and in 1796 he became a scribe in the library of the Ljubljana Lyceum, but soon gave this up, and for forty years devoted himself to teaching in the various schools of Ljubljana. In 1803 he was already director of the Normal School and in 1807 prefect of the high school, a job that he held until his sight failed. In his last years he was blind. He was honoured for his work there by Francis II. During the French annexation under the Illyrian Provinces, Hladnik was appointed professor of botany and natural history at the Central School of Ljubljana, and presented with a piece of land to be laid out for the cultivation of the flora of Carniola. It soon contained 600 kinds of local plants.

While occupied with his botanical garden, he also delivered lectures on botany and spent his holidays for thirty years in researching the crownland of Carniola. He died in Ljubljana, bequeathing his botanical collection to the Rudolfinum Public Museum, founded in Ljubljana in 1831. The museum contains his portrait, painted by Amalija Hermann von Hermannsthal. Among Hladnik's pupils was Alexander Skofitz, the founder of the Österreichische botanische Zeitschrift (Austrian Botanical Journal). Hladnik discovered several new kinds of plants and certain genera have been named after him. He did not publish any scientific works; his manuscripts now in possession of the Carniola Historical Society are written in Latin, German, French, and Slovenian.

He was buried at Saint Christopher's Cemetery in Ljubljana.

== See also ==
- List of Roman Catholic scientist-clerics
