= Boris Sket =

Slovene zoologist (1936–2023)

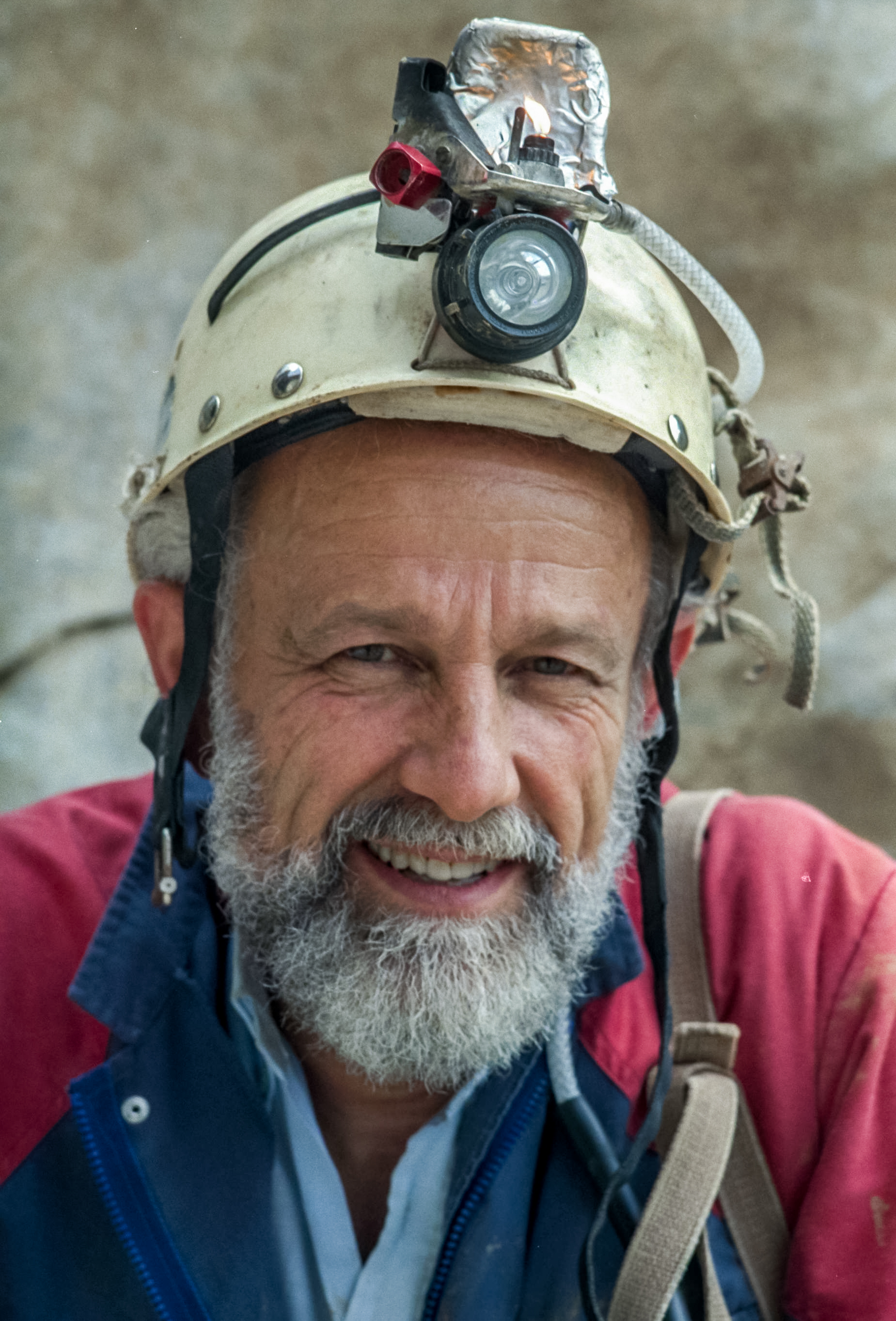
- Sket in 1995
- Born: 30 July 1936; Ljubljana, Kingdom of Yugoslavia
- Died: 7 May 2023 (aged 86); Ljubljana, Slovenia
- Education: University of Ljubljana
- Awards: Zois Award; 2003 for his scientific achievements Miroslav Zei Award; 2010 for his achievements in the field of zoology
- Scientific career
- Fields: speleobiology, systematics
- Workplaces: Department of Biology, Biotechnical faculty, University of Ljubljana

Boris Sket (30 July 1936 – 7 May 2023) was a Slovenian zoologist and speleobiologist.

Sket obtained his doctorate at the University of Ljubljana in 1961 and became a research assistant at the former Natural sciences faculty. In 1965, he became an invertebrate zoology professor at the Biotechnical faculty in Ljubljana and remained at this position until 2006. Between 1983 and 1985, Sket served as a dean of the Biotechnical faculty, and later, between 1989 and 1991, as the 37th rector of the University of Ljubljana. He was retired as a scientific councillor and still lecturing speleobiology to graduate and post-graduate students.

His research focuses on the faunistics of troglobionts and biospeleology in general. He described over a hundred new species, some genera and a family of invertebrates, mostly crustaceans and leeches. A new biogeographic classification of Dinaric cave fauna. First ecological investigations of anchihaline fauna.

Sket joined the ranks of Ljubljana Cave Exploration Society (DZRJL) in 1950 and in 1964 he discovered Borisov rov [Boris Tunnel], an important part of Najdena jama cave. While the focus of his research was the cave fauna of the Dinaric karst, he also took part in cave explorations in other areas such as Ecuador, Galapagos islands, Colombia, Crete island, The Philippines, Florida, Bermudas, Kenya and China. Sket was the president of the Caving Association of Slovenia, the president of the International Society of Subterranean Biology. He also served in editorial boards of several scholarly journals and was a subject field editor of the 'megajournal' Zootaxa.

In 2011, Sket became a member of the Slovenian Academy of Sciences and Arts. Additionally, he was a foreign member of the Academy of Sciences and Arts of Bosnia and Herzegovina. Holder of some national awards and medals. Approximately 35 animal species are named sketi, and three genera.

Sket died on 7 May 2023, at the age of 86.

== See also ==
- List of Slovenian biologists
