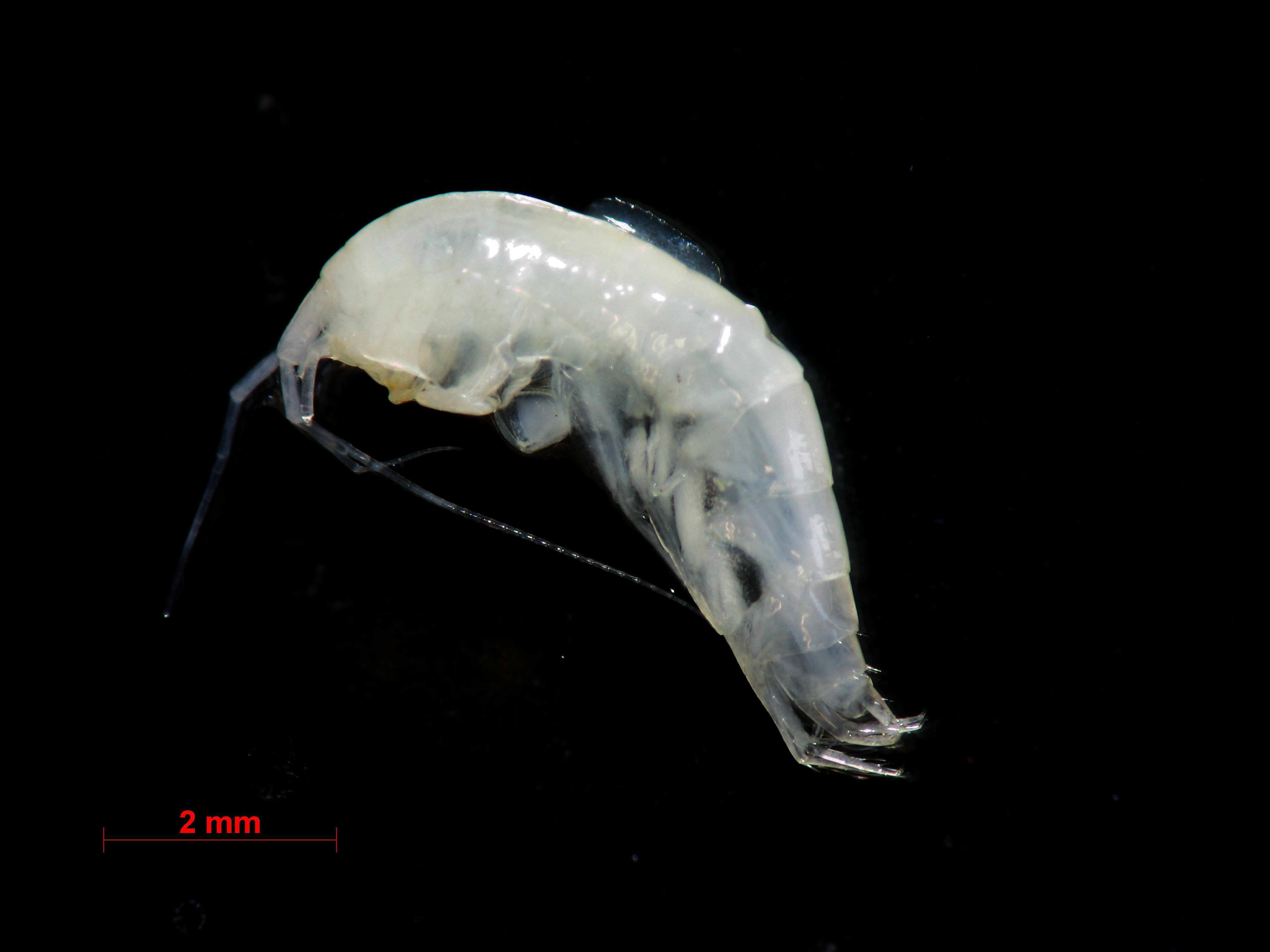

Scientific classification
- Kingdom: Animalia
- Phylum: Arthropoda
- Clade: Pancrustacea
- Class: Malacostraca
- Order: Amphipoda
- Suborder: Senticaudata
- Infraorder: Gammarida
- Parvorder: Crangonyctidira
- Superfamily: Crangonyctoidea
- Family: Niphargidae; Bousfield, 1977

= Niphargidae =

Family of crustaceans

Niphargidae is a family of amphipod crustaceans. Its distribution is in western Eurasia, and its members mainly live in subterranean freshwaters habitats. It contains the following genera:

- Carinurella Sket, 1971
- Foroniphargus G. Karaman, 1985
- Haploginglymus Mateus & Mateus, 1958
- Microniphargus Schellenberg, 1934
- Niphargellus Schellenberg, 1938
- Niphargobates Sket, 1981
- Niphargopsis Chevreux, 1922 (synonym of Niphargus)
- Niphargus Schiødte, 1847
- Pontoniphargus Dancău, 1970
