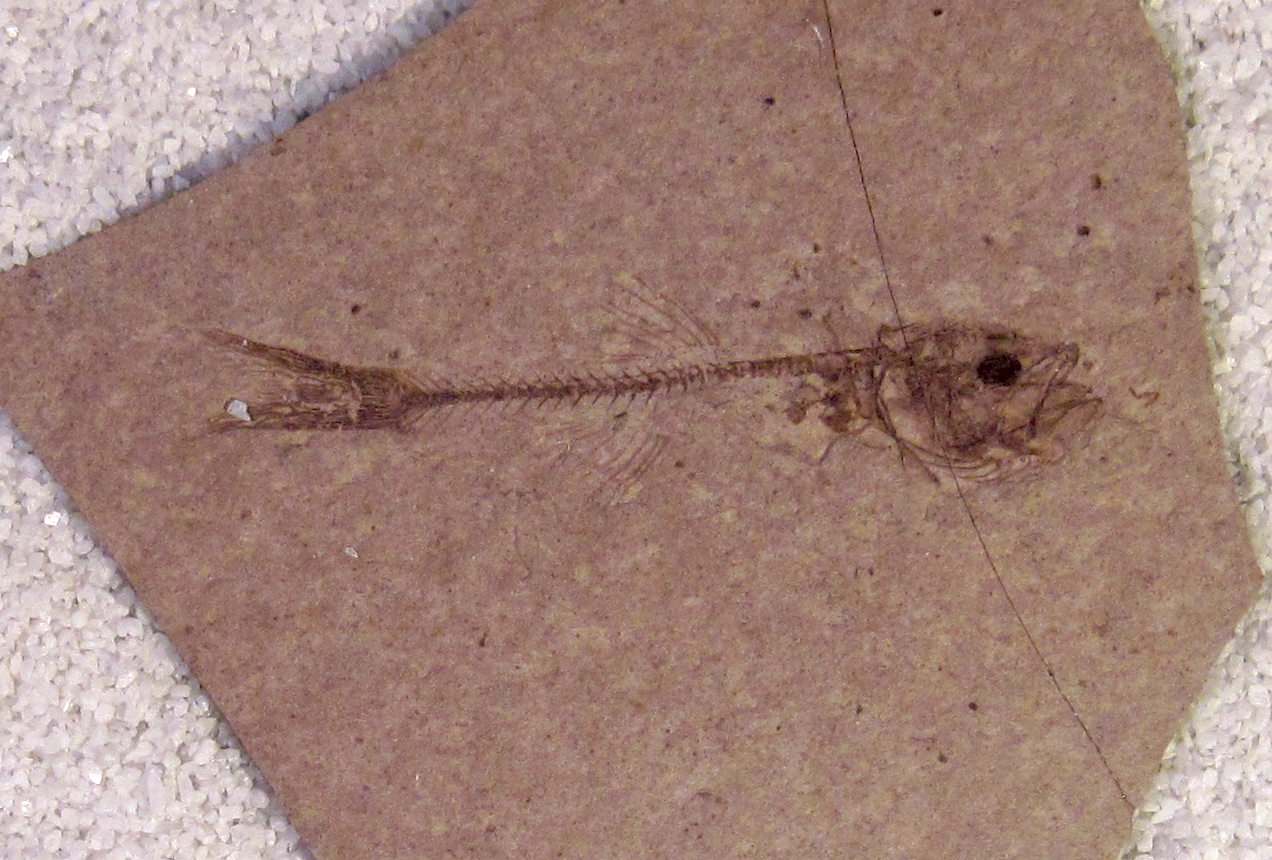
- Libotonius pearsoni, SRIC SR 95-26-19

Scientific classification
- Kingdom: Animalia
- Phylum: Chordata
- Class: Actinopterygii
- Division: Teleostei
- Order: Percopsiformes
- Family: Percopsidae
- Genus: †Libotonius; Wilson, 1977

Species
- L. blakeburnensis Wilson, 1977 (type); L. pearsoni Wilson 1979

= Libotonius =

Libotonius Temporal range: Ypresian

Extinct genus of fishes

Libotonius is an extinct genus of percopsiform fish which lived during the early Eocene epoch and contains two species, the type species Libotonius blakeburnensis plus Libotonius pearsoni. Libotonius has been variously treated as part of the expanded Percopsidae family, or formerly as a member of the monotypic family Libotoniidae.

== Distribution ==
Princeton and Republic

Libotonius fossils have been found at two sites belonging to the Eocene Okanagan Highlands of Washington and British Columbia. Of the two described species, Libotonius blakeburnensis is only known in the Allenby Formation's Whipsaw Creek sites south of Princeton in southcentral British Columbia. The formation has a long history of insect fossil collection, with the earliest Okanagan Highlands specimens being collected by the George Mercer Dawson party in 1877 and reported in 1879. The age of the Allenby Formation was debated for many years, with fish and insect fossils hinting at an Eocene age, while mammal and plant fossils suggested a Late Oligocene or Early Miocene age. The lake sediments at Princeton were radiometrically dated using the K-Ar method in the 1960s based on ash samples exposed in the lake bed. These samples yielded an age of ~48 million years ago; however, dating published in 2005 provided a ^{40}Ar-^{39}Ar radiometric date placing some Princeton sites at 52.08 ± 0.12 million years ago.

The second described species, Libotonius pearsoni known exclusively by fossils from the Klondike Mountain Formation exposed northwest of Republic in Ferry County, northeast Central Washington. The outcrop along Toroda Creek is considered to be the same general age as the Republic sites of "Boot Hill", UWBM B4131, and "Corner lot", site A0307. Tuffs of the Klondike Mountain Formation had been dated to 49.42 ± 0.54 million years ago, the youngest of the Okanagan Highlands sites, though a revised oldest age of 51.2 ± 0.1 million years ago was given based on isotopic data published in 2021.

== History ==
The first brief descriptions of fossils later attributed to Libotonius came from collections made in the 1960's by geologist R. C. Pearson while surveying for the United States Geological Survey Bodie Mountain Quadrangle map. The fossils were tentatively identified by paleoichthyologist David Dunkle as belonging to Erismatopterus, a genus now known to be confined to the Green River Formation in Wyoming, Colorado, and Utah. Pearson sent almost all of the specimens collected to the Smithsonian, but the fossils were never accessioned into the collections and are now considered lost.

Collection work was performed in the 1970's by Mark M. V. Wilson across the Okanagan Highlands fossil sites in both British Columbia and Washington, culminating in a series of publications on the Highlands fish fauna over the next two decades. The first major work published was Wilson's 1977 monograph Middle Eocene freshwater fishes from British Columbia covering almost all of the fish found in the highlands and initially naming several taxa, including Libotonius.

Description of the genus and type species was based on the holotype, "ROM 11157 A&B", plus a series of seven topotypes all collected by Wilson during 1970 and 1971 field work at the Blakeburm mine. He also identified a number of additional specimens which were collected by other people and not included in the type series. An isolated partial specimen collected in 1941 by Harington M. A. Rice and 5 additional complete fish donated by Réne Liboton were all collected from around Whipsaw Creek south of Princeton. Wilson coined the genus name Libotonius as a patronym honoring Mr Liboton, a fossil museum and rock shop owner from Vaseaux Lake who contributed L. blakeburnensis and Amyzon brevipinne specimens for study. Wilson did not elaborate on the origin of the species name "blakeburnensis". Wilson designated the Blakeburn Mine, ROM site L95, south of Coalmont the type locality of the genus and species in the Allenby Formation.

Two years later Wilson (1979) published the description of a second Libotonius species, Libotonius pearsoni based on fossils collected from Pearson's site along Toroda Creek. While the original specimens identified as Erismatopterus were lost by 1979, and thus not accessible to Wilson, he considered them to more likely belong to L. pearsoni than Erismatopterus. His description was based on the holotype, "UA 13466" with the paratypes "UA 14765" and "UA 13469", while an additional thirteen fish were listed as additional material specimens outside the type series. All of the specimens were collected during 1977 and 1978 fieldwork. Given the history of the Toroda creek Site, Wilson chose the species name pearsoni in recognition of R. C. Pearson and his initial work discovering the site.

== Phylogeny ==
2013 Borden et al phylogeny

- Percopsiformes
  - - - †Libotonius
      - - - - †Amphiplaga
            - †Erismatopterus
    - - - †Lateopisciculus
        - - †Massamorichthys
          - Percopsis
  - - †Mcconichthys
    - - - †Tricophanes
        - Aphredoderus
      - Amblyopsidae

In his discussion of L. blakeburnensis taxonomic affinities, Wilson (1977) deemed it a member of the family Percopsidae along with the fossil Erismatopterus plus the living Aphredoderus and Percopsis. This was based on several skull and skeletal characters including a reduced amount of scales present on the skull, reduced spines on the lachrymal and preopercular bones, and a reduced amount of teeth in the jaw and mouth cavity dentitions.

Lance Grande, in his 1988 description of Mcconichthys, listed the Libotonius species as belonging to the family "Libotoniidae", but did not provide a formal description of the family. He cited the work of Colin Patterson and Donn Eric Rosen, then "in press" and released in 1989, where they state finding no convincing characters to place Libotonius within the family Percopsidae. The uncertain placement of the genus was maintained by Murrey and Wilson (1999) who agreed with Patterson and Rosens placement of Libotonius basally as a Percopsiformes stem group. In Murry and Wilsons phylogenic assessments, they recovered Libotonius in a trichotomy with both Aphredoderidae and Percopsidae. By 2013, the placement of Libotonius was again shifting, this time back towards Percopsidae in various chapters of the book Mesozoic Fishes 5 – Global Diversity and Evolution. In the chapter by W. Calvin Borden, Terry Grande and W. Leo Smith which discusses Paracanthopterygii caudal fin osteology Borden et al justified the placement based on the skeletal similarities between Libotonius and the other core percopsids. In the phylogeny they produced, based on their interpretation of the evolution of 26 differing skeletal characters, Libotonius was basal in the Percopsidae, with Mcconichthys basal to the sister clade that included Aphredoderus. However in their earlier chapter on the history of Paracanthopterygii and possibilities of molecular phylogenetics, they list the studied specimens of Libotonius under "Libotoniidae".

Three years later Richard Van der Laan's 2016 Family-group names of fossil fishes listed "Libotoniidae" as a junior synonym of Percopsidae, but did not give a rational or reference for the placement. The 2016 Fishes of the World 5th edition discusses Libotonius within the paragraph on Percopsidae as a percopsid that is sometimes treated in the separate family "Libotoniidae". The placement in Percopsidae was uncertain in Murray et al (2020) who presented to cladograms in relation to the placement of the Cretaceous genus Lindoeichthys from Alberta. In the unconstrained cladogram, the two Libotonius are successive sister clades to the core Percopsidae within the family, however in the 50% majority rule cladogram, both species are placed just outside the family in polytomy with Percopsidae and Mcconichthys, Murray et al treating them as either sisters to the family or included in an expanded clade.

== Description ==
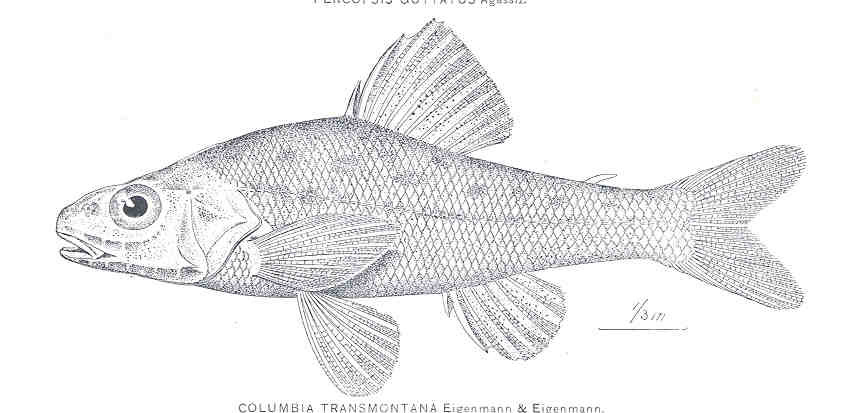
Percopsis transmontana Native to the Columbia River

Libotonius are small fish where adults range between 10.6–40.0 mm (0.42–1.57 in) long with narrow bodies and large heads. The premaxilla are narrower and longer in proportion then seen in Amphiplaga, Erismatopterus and Percopsis, and unlike those genera, it appears to lack a protrusion on the upper edge, the postmaxillary process. There are a reduced number of teeth in Libotonius species due to the endopterygoid, ectopterygoid and vomer bones all being toothless, while the palatine is toothed. The vertebral skeleton is composed of between 38 and 43 vertebrae on average. The two dorsal fins have seven and ten rays, while the anal fins have an average of eight to ten. The pectoral fins have between 12 and 15 rays, contrasting the pelvic fin with one spine and seven rays. In the caudal fin the final two vertebra of the spine, the preural and ural centra are fused into one bone, a condition present in the other percopsids. The scales are round with concentric growth rings called circuli and up to thirteen ctenii spines on the rear margins.

=== Libotonius blakeburnensis ===
In overall size, Libotonius blakeburnensis is larger than L. pearsoni in standard length, thus the nose tip through the final vertebrae, but excluding the length of the caudal fin itself. L. blakeburnensis has a standard length ranging between 30–40 mm (1.2–1.6 in) long based on the described specimens in 1979. The total vertebral count of 33–34 is similar to L. pearsoni being an estimated two longer. The vertebrae are distributed into an estimated 15 precaudal vertebrae, between the skull and rear of the dorsal fin, and 18–19 caudal vertebrae, between the dorsal fin end and the base of the tail complex. The precaudal vertebrae are further grouped as seven predorsal vertebrae in front of the dorsal fin, and eight precaudals with pterygiophore spines forming part of the dorsal fin. The dorsal fin has two to three spines and then 8–10 soft rays and the anal fin is similar with two spines and 8–9 rays. The pectoral fins have a greater number or rays, 13–15, than seen in L. pearsoni.

=== Libotonius pearsoni ===
Libotonius pearsoni is the smaller species of the genus, with a standard length between 10.6–20.8 mm (0.42–0.82 in) and a total vertebrae count of between 31–32. The dorsal fin is supported by two unbranched spines and 7–9 soft rays, but the anal fin has 2 spines and 8–10 rays, different from the numbers of rays in L. blakeburnensis where the dorsal has more rays and the anal has less. The pectoral fins have a smaller number of rays at 12–13 total.

== Paleoenvironment ==
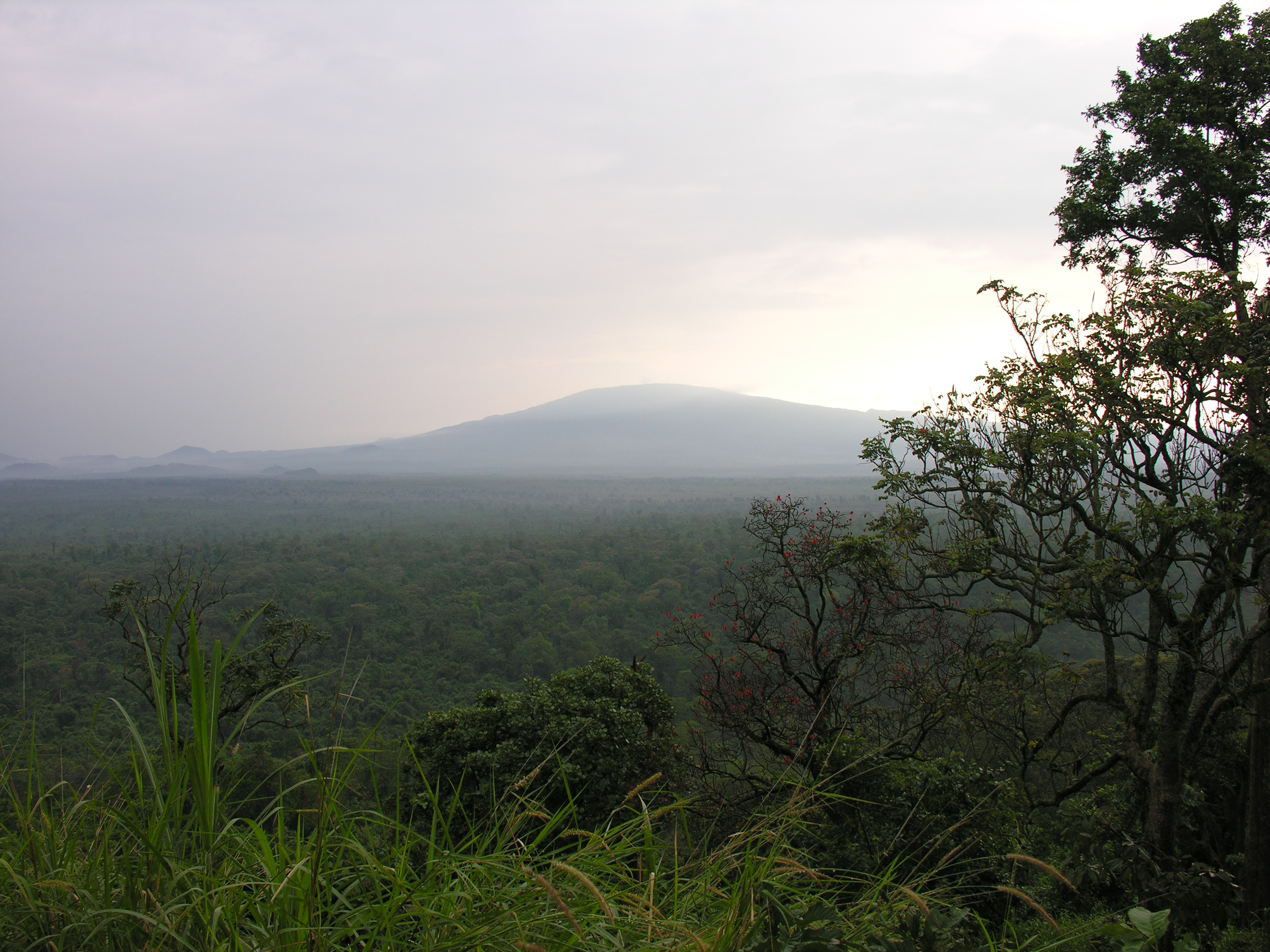
Virunga National Park, Albertine Rift, Africa

Both the Republic and Princeton sites are part of a larger fossil site system collectively known as the Eocene Okanagan Highlands. The highlands, including the Early Eocene formations between Driftwood Canyon at the north and Republic at the south, have been described as one of the "Great Canadian Lagerstätten" based on the diversity, quality and unique nature of the paleofloral and paleofaunal biotas that are preserved. The highlands temperate biome preserved across a large transect of lakes recorded many of the earliest appearances of modern genera, while also documenting the last stands of ancient lines. The warm temperate highland floras in association with downfaulted lacustrine basins and active volcanism are noted to have no exact modern equivalents. This is due to the more seasonally equitable conditions of the Early Eocene, resulting in much lower seasonal temperature shifts. However, the highlands have been compared to the upland ecological islands in the Virunga Mountains within the Albertine Rift of the African rift valley.

The Republic and Princeton upland lake systems were surrounded by a warm temperate ecosystem with nearby volcanism. The highlands likely had a mesic upper microthermal to lower mesothermal climate, in which winter temperatures rarely dropped low enough for snow, and which were seasonably equitable. The paleoforests surrounding the lakes have been described as precursors to the modern temperate broadleaf and mixed forests of Eastern North America and Eastern Asia. Based on the fossil biotas the lakes were higher and cooler than the coeval coastal forests preserved in the Puget Group and Chuckanut Formation of Western Washington, which are described as lowland tropical forest ecosystems. Estimates of the paleoelevation range between 0.7–1.2 km (0.43–0.75 mi) higher than the coastal forests. This is consistent with the paleoelevation estimates for the lake systems, which range between 1.1–2.9 km (1,100–2,900 m), which is similar to the modern elevation 0.8 km (0.50 mi), but higher.

Estimates of the mean annual temperature have been derived from climate leaf analysis multivariate program (CLAMP) and leaf margin analysis (LMA) of the Republic and Princeton paleofloras. The CLAMP results after multiple linear regressions for Republic gave a mean annual temperature of approximately 8.0 °C (46.4 °F), with the LMA giving 9.2 ± 2.0 °C (48.6 ± 3.6 °F). CLAMP results from Princeton returned the lower 5.1 °C (41.2 °F), confirmed by the LMA with a mean annual temperature of 5.1 ± 2.2 °C (41.2 ± 4.0 °F). Both Formations are lower than the mean annual temperature estimates given for the coastal Puget Group, which is estimated to have been between 15–18.6 °C (59.0–65.5 °F). The bioclimatic analysis for Republic and Princeton suggests mean annual precipitation amounts of 115 ± 39 cm (45 ± 15 in) and 114 ± 42 cm (45 ± 17 in) respectively.
