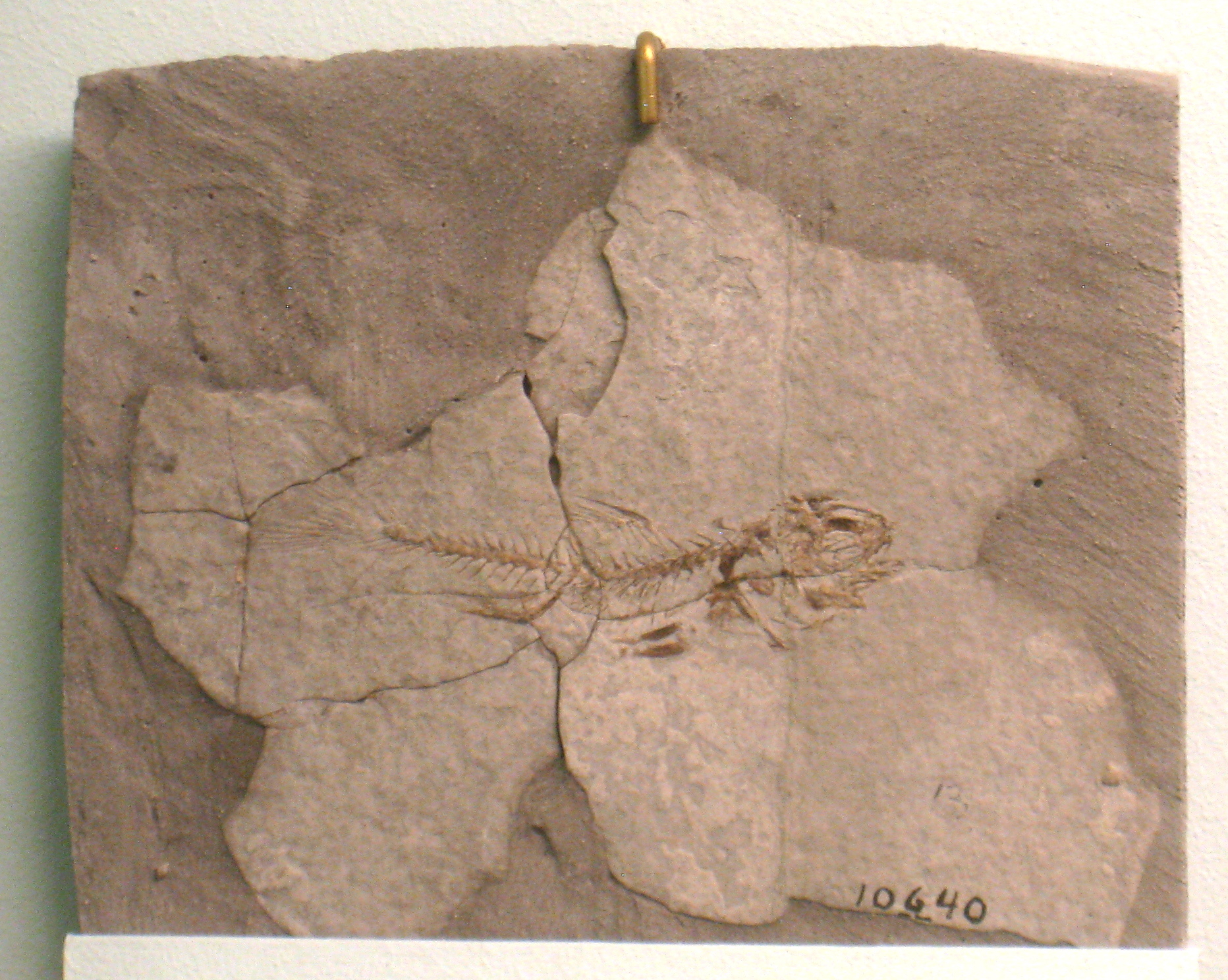

Scientific classification
- Kingdom: Animalia
- Phylum: Chordata
- Class: Actinopterygii
- Order: Percopsiformes
- Family: Percopsidae
- Genus: †Erismatopterus
- Species: †E. levatus

Binomial name
- †Erismatopterus levatus (Cope, 1870)

Synonyms
- Cyprinodon levatus Cope, 1870; Erismatopterus rickseckeri Cope, 1871

= Erismatopterus =

Erismatopterus Temporal range: Ypresian

Extinct genus of fishes

Erismatopterus is an extinct genus of percopsiform fish which lived during the early to middle Eocene epoch and containing the single species Erismatopterus levatus. A report of the genus in sediments of similar age in Washington State have been discredited. Erismatopterus is treated as part of the family Percopsidae, but formerly was the type genus of the extinct family Erismatopteridae. The genus is closely related to Amphiplaga of related lake sediments. Shoaling behavior has been reported from a mass mortality fossil of E. levatus and attributed as a predator-evasion response behavior.

== Distribution ==
Erismatopterus levatus is known from solitary fossils and mass mortality groups which are compression-impression fossils preserved in layers of soft sedimentary rock. Along with other well preserved fish fossils, the E. levatus specimens are found in several outcrops of the Early to Middle Eocene Green River Formations Lake Gosiute and Lake Uinta. The formation is a group of Late Paleocene to Late Eocene depositional basins in Wyoming, Colorado, and Utah. Of the three paleolakes that comprise the formation, E. levatus seems to have been absent from Fossil Lake. Study of the paleoflora preserved in the formation indicates the lake was around 1,500–2,900 metres (4,900–9,500 ft) in elevation surrounded by a tropical to subtropical environment that had a distinct dry season.

Robert Carl Pearson (1967) reported on fish fossils collected in the Okanagan Highlands Toroda Creek Graben northwest of Republic, Washington, from Klondike Mountain Formation outcrops. Pearson had collected the fossils during field mapping in the early 1960s for his Geologic map of the Bodie Mountain quadrangle, Ferry and Okanogan Counties, Washington. Among the fish sent to the Smithsonian for identified by paleoichthyologist David Dunkle was at least one specimen which Dunkle tentatively identified as Erismatopterus. Pearson sent almost all of the specimens collected in the 1960s Washington field work to the Smithsonian; however, the fossils were never accessioned into the collections and were considered lost by 1978. Mark Wilson (1979) in his description of Libotonius pearsoni noted the probability that the Toroda Creek fossil or fossils actually belonged to his new species and likely did not belong to Erismatopterus.

== History and classification ==
The type species was described by Edward Drinker Cope (1870) as Cyprinodon levatus, and considered a species of pupfish. The placement was revised a year later when he described the genus Erismatopterus with Erismatopterus rickseckeri as the type species, and E. levatus moved into the genus as a second species. In 1877 a third species Erismatopterus endlichi was also described by Edward Drinker Cope, and the genus was considered to have three species though the 1960s. Review of the genus by ichthyologists Donn Eric Rosen and Colin Patterson (1969) however resulted in several changes, notably that E. endlichi was deemed a junior synonym of Amphiplaga brachyptera and E. rickseckeri a jr synonym of E. levatus, leaving Erismatopterus monotypic.

=== Etymology ===
Lance Grande (1984) suggested the genus name to be derived the Greek word erisma meaning "cause of dispute", top meaning "place" and ter meaning wonder. Grande notes that while Cope did not provide an etymological explanation for the name, it may have been a reference to Cope's difficulty in classification of the fossils.

=== Phylogeny ===
Erismatopterus is placed in the Paracanthopterygii family Percopsidae and phylogenetic analysis by Borden et al (2013) placed it as a sister genus to †Amphiplaga which is only found in Fossil Lake. Erismatopterus and Amphiplaga have been considered closely allied genera since the early 1900s, so much so that David Starr Jordan (1905) placed them into a separate family Erismatopteridae. This placement was challenged by Rosen and Patterson who deemed the differences found by Jordan insufficient reason to segregate the genera into a stand-alone family. Rosen and Patterson chose to include both in an expanded Percopsidae.

2013 Borden et al phylogeny

- Percopsiformes
  - - - †Libotonius
      - - - - †Amphiplaga
            - †Erismatopterus
    - - - †Lateopisciculus
        - - †Massamorichthys
          - Percopsis
  - - †Mcconichthys
    - - - †Tricophanes
        - Aphredoderus
      - Amblyopsidae

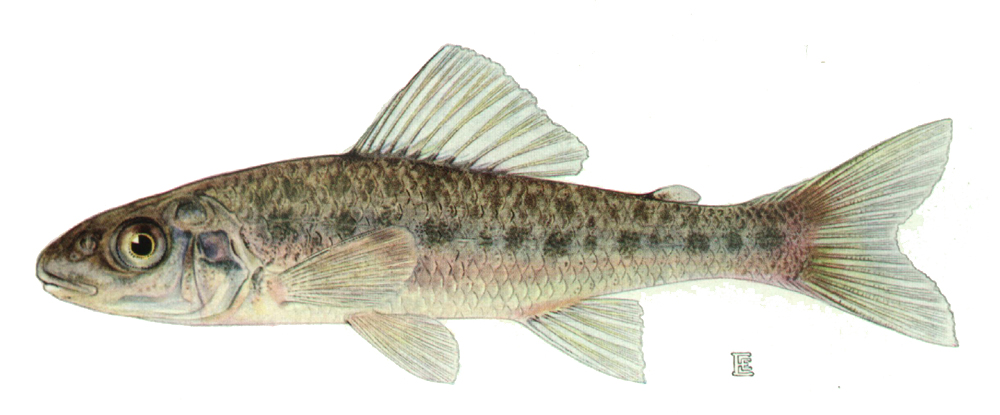
Modern "trout-perch" Percopsis omiscomaycus native east of the Rocky Mountains

== Description ==
On average, adult Erismatopterus levatus are about 5 cm (2.0 in) with an upper size limit around 12.5 cm (4.9 in). This is smaller than adults of Amphiplaga but larger than adults of either Libotonius species. The body of E. levatus was speckled with small dark spots in life along with larger dark patches along the back and midline. At the time, Grande (1984) reported that no specimens had been preserved with an adipose fin as is found on living Percopsis species, but distortion of the upper back between Dorsal fin and caudal fin suggests adults may have had one in life. The backbone is composed of between 13 and 14 precaudal vertebrae plus 15 to 17 caudal vertebrae. The dorsal fins have between 7–9 fin rays, with two unbranched and 6–7 branched rays. The anal fin is between 7–8 rays of which two are unbranched. The caudal fin is formed from two unbranched rays and two groups of 8 branched rays in a 1,8,8,1 pattern from top to bottom.

== Behaviour ==
Shoaling behavior has been ascribed to Erismatopterus levatus based on a 570 mm × 375 mm (22.4 in × 14.8 in) shale slab specimen, FPDM-V8206 in the Fukui Prefectural Dinosaur Museum, Japan, which was detailed by Nobuaki Mizumoto, Shinya Miyata, and Stephen C. Pratt (2019). The slab preserves a total of 259 fish, 257 of which are grouped in a nearly unidirectional elliptical cluster where all but 8 of them face the same direction. Based on the small size range of the fish, between 10.57–23.54 mm (0.416–0.927 in), the authors suggest the shoal was of juvenile fish, as the type specimen for the species is larger at 65 mm (2.6 in) long. The specimen was compared to two other mass mortality slabs from the Green River Formation to determine if the inferred clustering was truly behavior related. The other two slabs were of 35 Gosiutichthys and a mixed group of 276 Knightia accompanied by two Diplomystus, and four Mioplosus. Neither of the other slabs showed the distinct directionality or positioning between fish that is seen with the FPDM-V8206 specimen. Given the positioning of the E. levatus fry Mizumoto et al inferred the behavior was likely a form of group predator avoidance. This is supported by the presence in the same formation of fossil catfish, gar, and Diplomystus all of which would have been possible predators of the young fish. Grande (1984) posited that E. levatus was possibly an insectivore, planktivore, combination of the two, or possibly an omnivore combing one or both of the mentioned diets with herbivory on algaes or plants.
