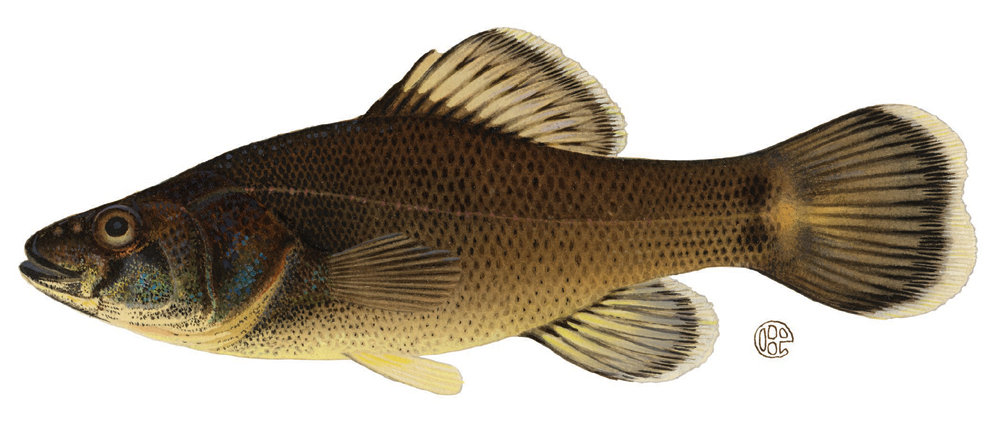

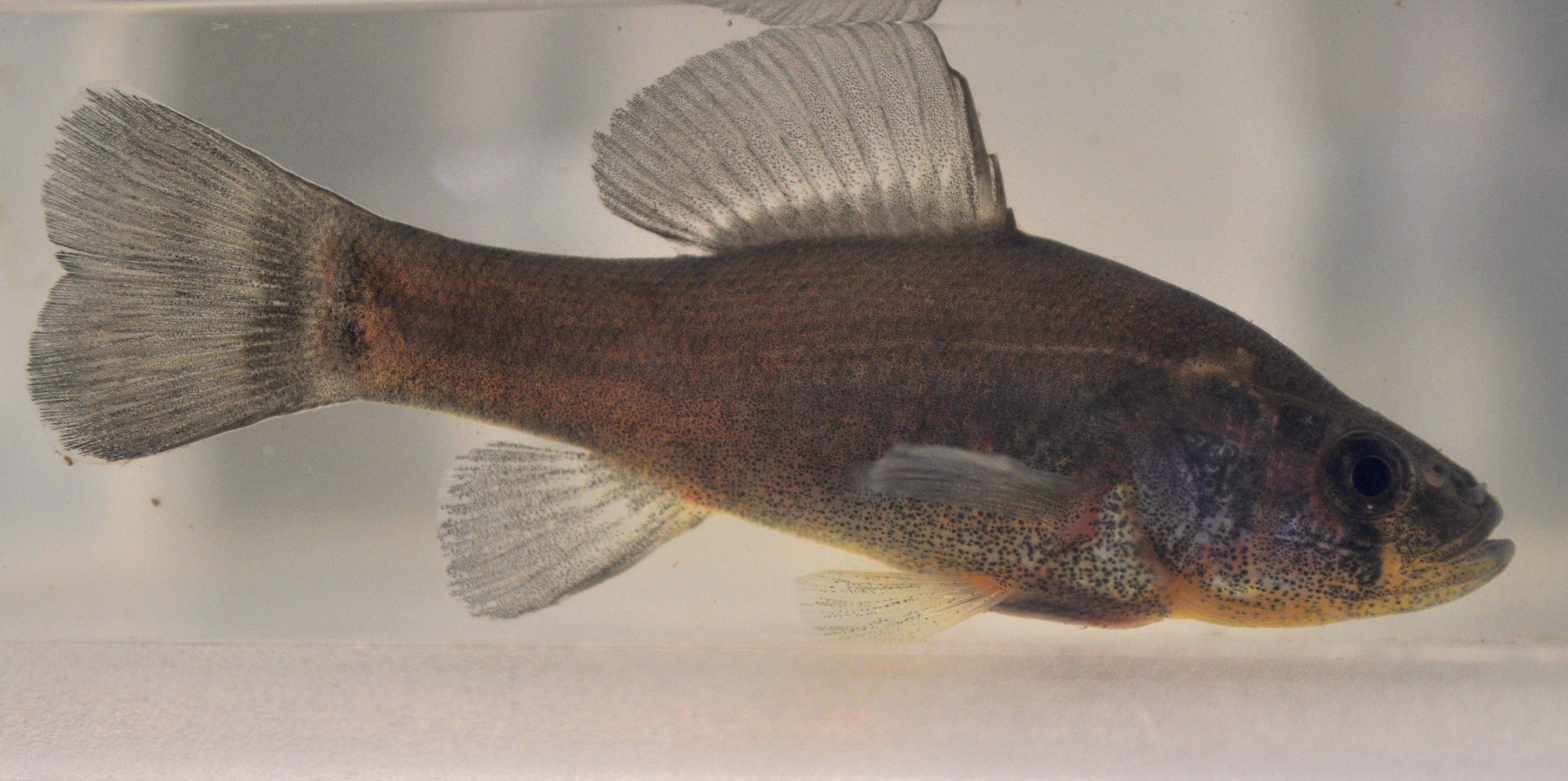

Conservation status
- Least Concern (IUCN 3.1)

Scientific classification
- Kingdom: Animalia
- Phylum: Chordata
- Class: Actinopterygii
- Division: Teleostei
- Order: Percopsiformes
- Suborder: Aphredoderoidei
- Family: Aphredoderidae; Bonaparte, 1846
- Genus: Aphredoderus; Lesueur in Cuvier & Valenciennes, 1833
- Species: A. sayanus

Binomial name
- Aphredoderus sayanus (Gilliams, 1824)

Synonyms
- Sternotremia isolepis Nelson, 1876; Aphrodedirus cookianus Jordan, 1877

= Pirate perch =

Species of fish

The pirate perch (Aphredoderus sayanus) is a freshwater fish that commonly inhabits coastal waters along the east coast of the United States and the backwater areas of the Mississippi Valley. This species is often found towards the bottom of clear, warm water habitats with low currents. These fish are normally solitary, carnivorous, and nocturnal. The pirate perch is known to consume live mosquito larva, amphipods, glass shrimp, meal worms, small fish, dragonfly and stonefly larvae, and earthworms.

The pirate perch is related to the trout-perches in the family Percopsidae, but only loosely; as it is in the family Aphredoderidae. The genus name, Aphredoderus, literally translates to "excrement throat" in Greek, referencing the unusual location of its anus in the throat region. The specific name sayanus is a tribute to naturalist Thomas Say. Charles C. Abbott gave the fish its common name after observing it eating only other fishes.

== Description ==
This small fish is up to 14 cm (5.5 in) in total length. It is dark brown, sometimes with a darker band near the base of the tail. In young individuals the anus is located between the pelvic fins, but migrates forward as the fish grows, before it settles on the throat region.

Pirate perch may be the only known animal to exhibit a chemical camouflage, or crypsis that is generalized and effective among a wide number of potential prey species.

== Distribution ==
The pirate perch is a freshwater species found in temperate climates where the water temperature generally ranges from 5 to 26 °C (41–79 °F). They are found most commonly in central and eastern North America. The pirate perch occurs in rivers of the Atlantic and Gulf slopes, the Mississippi Valley, and scattered parts of the eastern Great Lakes Basin. The subspecies A. s. gibbosus occurs west of the Eastern Continental Divide and in the Gulf of Mexico basin west of the Mississippi River, while the nominate subspecies occurs along most of the Atlantic coast north of the Florida–Georgia border; intergrades are found from Florida to Mississippi. Pirate perch once occurred in Pennsylvania, in the Delaware River drainage, but have since likely been extirpated, according to the Nature Conservancy. The species may also be extirpated in Ohio. Its geographic range is very limited in the United States, and the creation of dams and the increasing effects of urbanization are restricting the overall habitat size for the fish, which could eventually lead to this species becoming extirpated in some areas.

== Ecology ==
These fish can be found in densely vegetated areas, places with woody debris, and underneath banks in root masses. Debris in deep water with undercut banks and slow inside flows are used more by this species. The area where the perch reside is dependent on their size, with medium to large perch occupying places that were more structurally complex than small ones. They are known to congregate in these areas to avoid predation from piscivorous birds, otters, or mink. The pirate perch has nocturnal feeding habits; their diet consists of live mosquito larva, amphipods, glass shrimp, meal worms, small fish, dragonfly and stonefly larvae, and earthworms.

== Life history ==
Breeding occurs from October to December in Florida and in Louisiana as early as February. Most breeding occurs around early April until May, depending on latitude. When breeding, pirate perch use underwater root masses as the microhabitat for their larvae. Females have been observed thrusting their heads into sheltered canals of underwater root masses and releasing eggs. The male perch then come to these sites, enter the canal head-first, and proceed to fertilize the eggs in the same manner they were laid. Females can lay between 100 and 400 eggs, which is dependent on the body size. They are able to reproduce after one year, and can live up to four years in the wild.

This species' method of breeding was misunderstood for quite some time due to difficulties in making in situ observations. At first, the urogenital positioning of the pirate perch was speculated to serve to promote egg transfer to the fish's gill (branchial) chamber for gill-brooding. However, the pirate perch was found to not brood bronchially; instead, they lay their eggs within underwater root masses which are then fertilized by the males. Nevertheless, a unique spawning behavior has been observed, which has been referred to as transbranchioral ("through the gill chamber"). When the eggs are laid, they are transferred directly from the urogenital to the gill chamber and then spat out through the mouth into the substrate. Among fish, gill-brooding is only known from Amblyopsis cavefish.

== Current management ==
According to the Iowa Department of Natural Resources, some major threats that could affect their habitats could be siltation due to poor upland treatment. Since these fish reside in habitats with slight water current, a change upstream such as water channels, dams, or drainages could alter the flow of water in that system, which could change the rate at which water flows downstream. Water pollution as a result from agricultural runoff and discharge from urban areas can create environments unsuitable for these species. Ohio has expressed some interest in conserving the species due to the perch having such a small area it can inhabit in the northwestern part of the state. Besides Ohio, little concern has been shown about this species overall.
