= Dunkle =

Dunkle is a surname. Notable people with the surname include:

- Clare B. Dunkle (born 1964), American author
- Davey Dunkle (1872–1941), Major League Baseball pitcher
- David Dunkle (1911–1984), American paleontologist
- Jon Dunkle (born 1960), American serial killer
- Margaret Dunkle (born 1947), American academic
- Nancy Dunkle (born 1955), American basketball player
- William Dunkle (born 1999), American football player

== See also ==
- Dunkel (disambiguation)
- Dunkle Corners, Pennsylvania, unincorporated community
- Dunkle Run, tributary in Pennsylvania
