= Dunckel =

Dunckel is a surname. Notable people with the surname include:

- Dorothea Dunckel (1799–1878), Swedish poet, translator, and playwright
- Jean-Benoît Dunckel (born 1969), French musician
- Miller Dunckel (1899–1975), Michigan politician

== See also ==
- Dunkle
