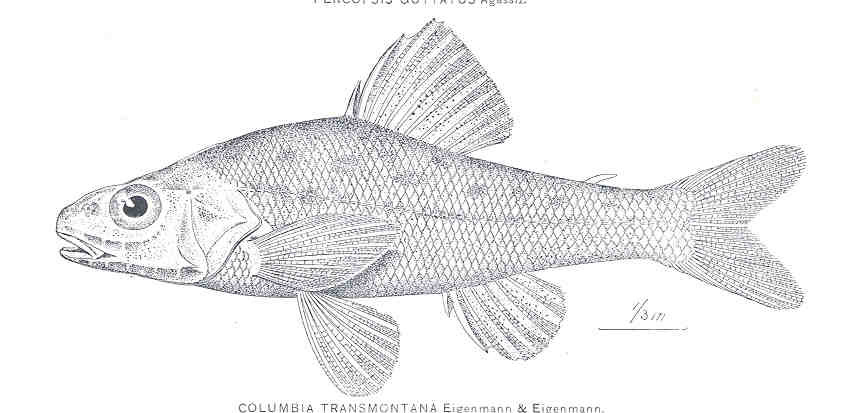

Conservation status
- Least Concern (IUCN 3.1)

Scientific classification
- Kingdom: Animalia
- Phylum: Chordata
- Class: Actinopterygii
- Order: Percopsiformes
- Family: Percopsidae
- Genus: Percopsis
- Species: P. transmontana

Binomial name
- Percopsis transmontana (C. H. Eigenmann & R. S. Eigenmann, 1892)

= Percopsis transmontana =

Species of fish

Percopsis transmontana, the sand roller, is a species of percopsiform fish endemic to the Columbia River drainage in the northwestern United States. This species grows to a length of 9.6 centimetres (3.8 in) TL. Sand rollers can live up to 6 years in slow-moving, sandy-bottomed streams and rivers among vegetation. Their diet includes flies and Trichoptera, although juveniles also have been known to eat crustacean zooplankton.
