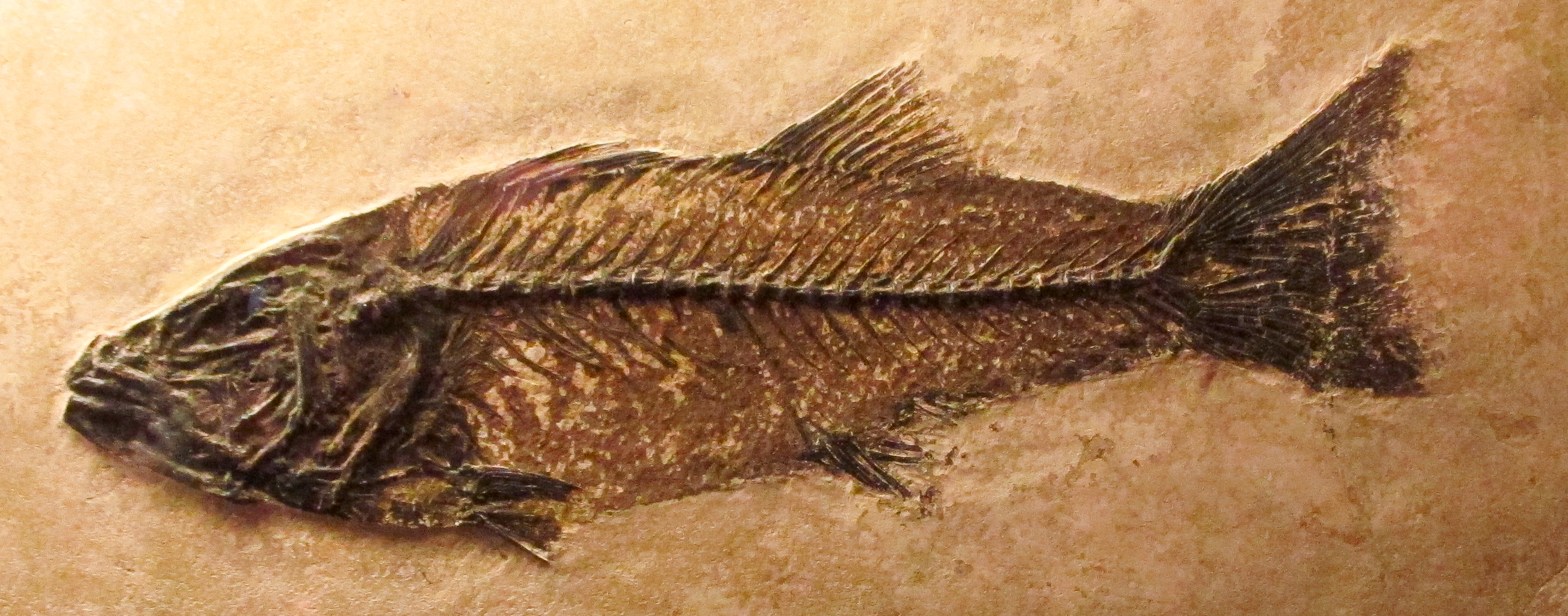
- Mioplosus labracoides

Scientific classification
- Kingdom: Animalia
- Phylum: Chordata
- Class: Actinopterygii
- Order: Carangiformes
- Suborder: Centropomoidei
- Family: Latidae
- Genus: †Mioplosus; Cope, 1877

= Mioplosus =

Mioplosus Temporal range: Early- Middle Eocene

Extinct genus of fishes

Mioplosus is an extinct genus of lates perches that lived from the early to middle Eocene (about 56 to 33.9 million years ago). Five species of the genus has been described, Mioplosus labracoides is found in the Green River Formation Lagerstätte.

Mioplosus are similar to modern Latidae member, and like them have two dorsal fins, the anterior dorsal fin spiny and the posterior soft-rayed. Fossil Mioplosus up to 20 inches (51 cm) have been found, but anything over 16 inches (41 cm) is rare.

Mioplosus have pointed teeth and are believed to have been active predators, some individuals having been found with fish lodged in its throat. Mioplosus fossils are not found in large groups, which suggest they were solitary.

== See also ==
- Prehistoric fish
- List of prehistoric bony fish
- Green River Formation
