= Dunkels =

Dunkels is a surname. Notable people with the surname include:

- Adam Dunkels (born 1978), Swedish entrepreneur and programmer
- Paul Dunkels (born 1947), English cricketer

== See also ==
- Dunkel (disambiguation)
