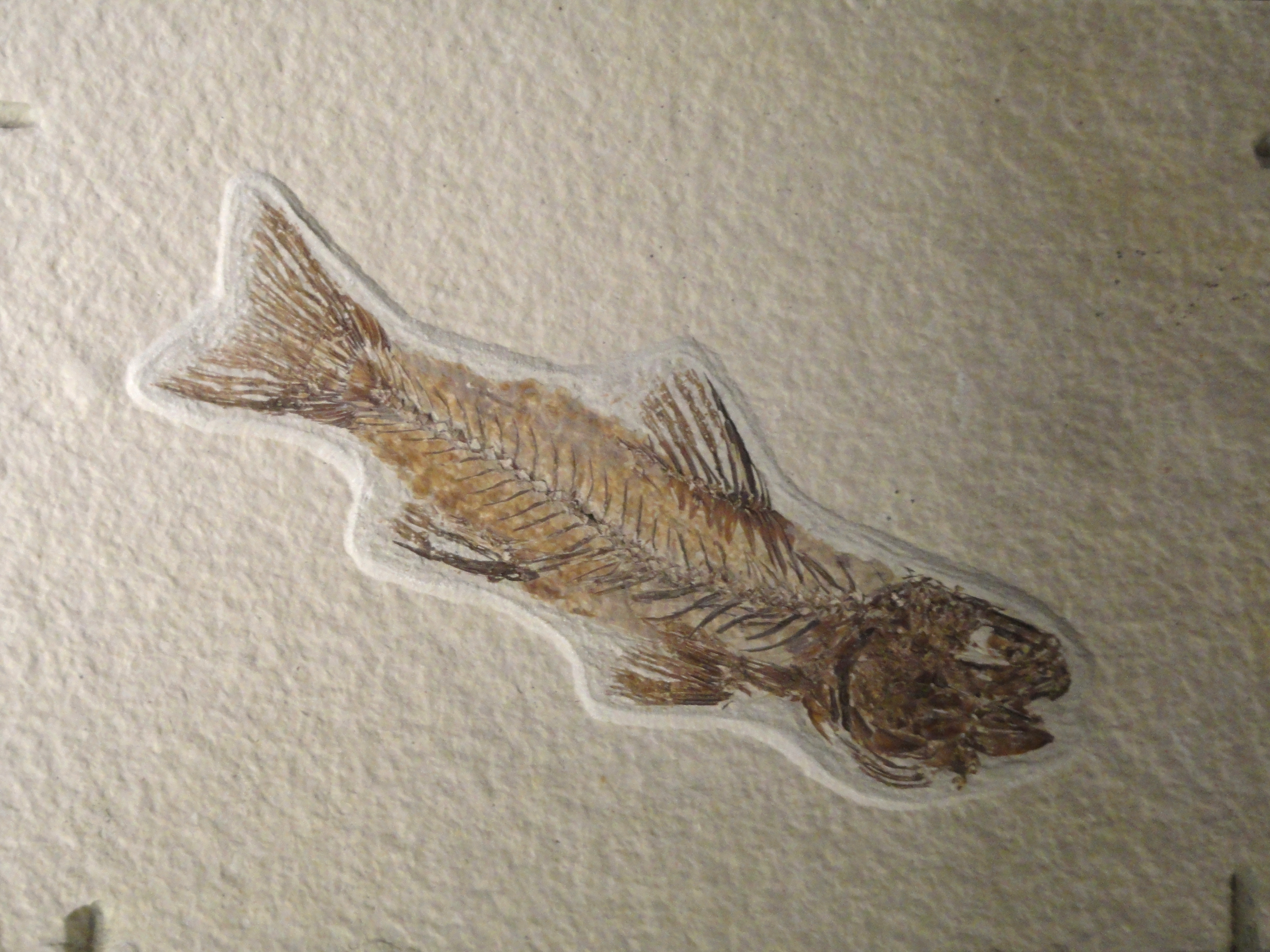
- Fossil specimen, Natural History Museum of Utah

Scientific classification
- Kingdom: Animalia
- Phylum: Chordata
- Class: Actinopterygii
- Order: Percopsiformes
- Family: Percopsidae
- Genus: †Amphiplaga; Cope, 1877
- Species: †A. brachyptera

Binomial name
- †Amphiplaga brachyptera Cope, 1877

= Amphiplaga =

Amphiplaga Temporal range: Early Eocene

Extinct genus of fishes

Amphiplaga is an extinct genus of freshwater ray-finned fish from the Early Eocene of North America. It was a percopsid closely related to the modern trout-perch.

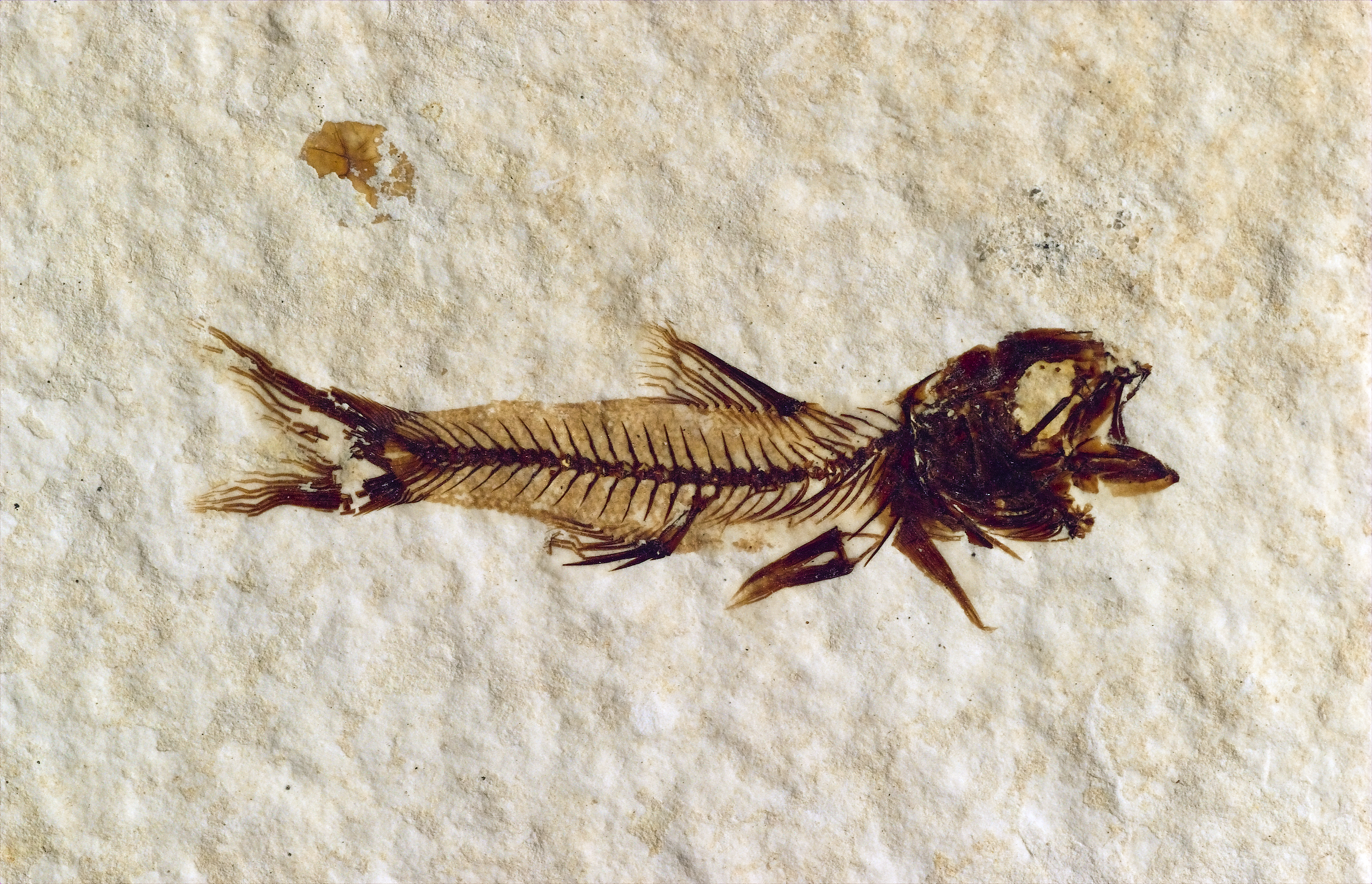
A juvenile A. brachyptera specimen

It contains a single species, A. brachyptera from the Fossil Lake deposits of the Green River Formation in Wyoming, US. It is one of two percopsids known from the Green River Formation, the other being Erismatopterus which is known from the other two lake deposits comprising the formation. It can be distinguished from Erismatopterus by the three hard spines on its dorsal fin rays, and its larger body size. The species Erismatopterus endlicheri is thought to be synonymous with Amphiplaga.
