= Jon Dunkle =

American serial killer

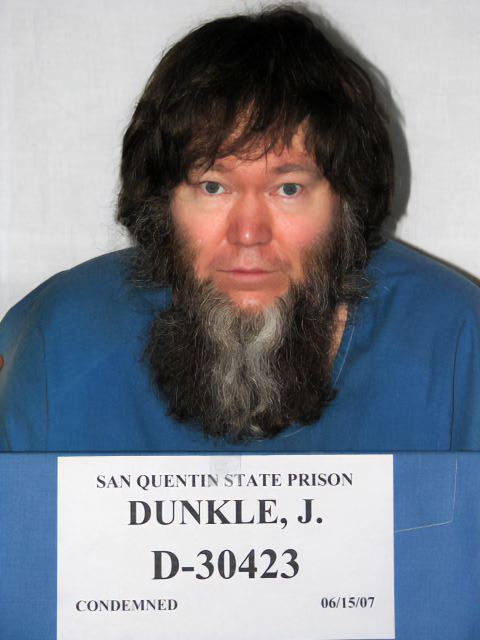
- Dunkle in a 2007 prison photograph
- Born: Jon Scott Dunkle; October 11, 1960 (age 65); Los Angeles, California, U.S.
- Conviction: First-degree murder
- Penalty: Death (1989); Life imprisonment (1995)

Details
- Victims: 3
- Span of crimes: 1981–1985
- Country: United States
- State: California
- Date apprehended: July 5, 1985
- Imprisoned at: San Quentin State Prison

Jon Scott Dunkle (born October 11, 1960) is an American serial killer who murdered three young boys in Belmont, California, between 1981 and 1985. Dunkle was convicted of two of the murders in 1989 and was sentenced to death early the following year. Dunkle received an additional sentence of life imprisonment without the possibility of parole in 1994 after pleading guilty to a 1985 murder. In addition to the three boys that were murdered, Dunkle assaulted numerous other boys and was arrested for other crimes, including burglaries and hit-and-run incidents.

== Murders ==
On November 8, 1981, John Thomas Davies, 15, disappeared from his Belmont home. Following Davies' disappearance, his family became advocates for missing, abused, and exploited children. They helped establish the Violent Crimes Information Center, which provided law enforcement agencies a network to share their resources.

On November 5, 1982, Steve Murphy was hit by a car while walking home from a party. He was then placed in the trunk of the car, driven to a remote area of Belmont, and dumped in a ravine. The following month, on December 31, 1982, Dunkle struck Monte Hansen, 15, with a two-by-four board at his San Mateo home. Both Murphy and Hansen survived.

On October 2, 1984, 12-year-old Lance Turner was found dead near Water Dog Lake in Belmont, having been stabbed 23 times. On November 19, Turner's grandmother received a phone call from an unidentified man stating, "I'm sorry, I'm sorry – should I do it again – I'm sorry, really sorry."

On July 2, 1985, 12-year-old Sean Gregory Dannehl disappeared while riding his bike in Fair Oaks. His body was found six days later, near the south side of the American River. During Dunkle's trial, it was revealed that Dannehl was forced to remove his clothing before he was stabbed in the chest and throat. After Dannehl was dead, Dunkle stabbed him once in each eye.

== Arrest and convictions ==
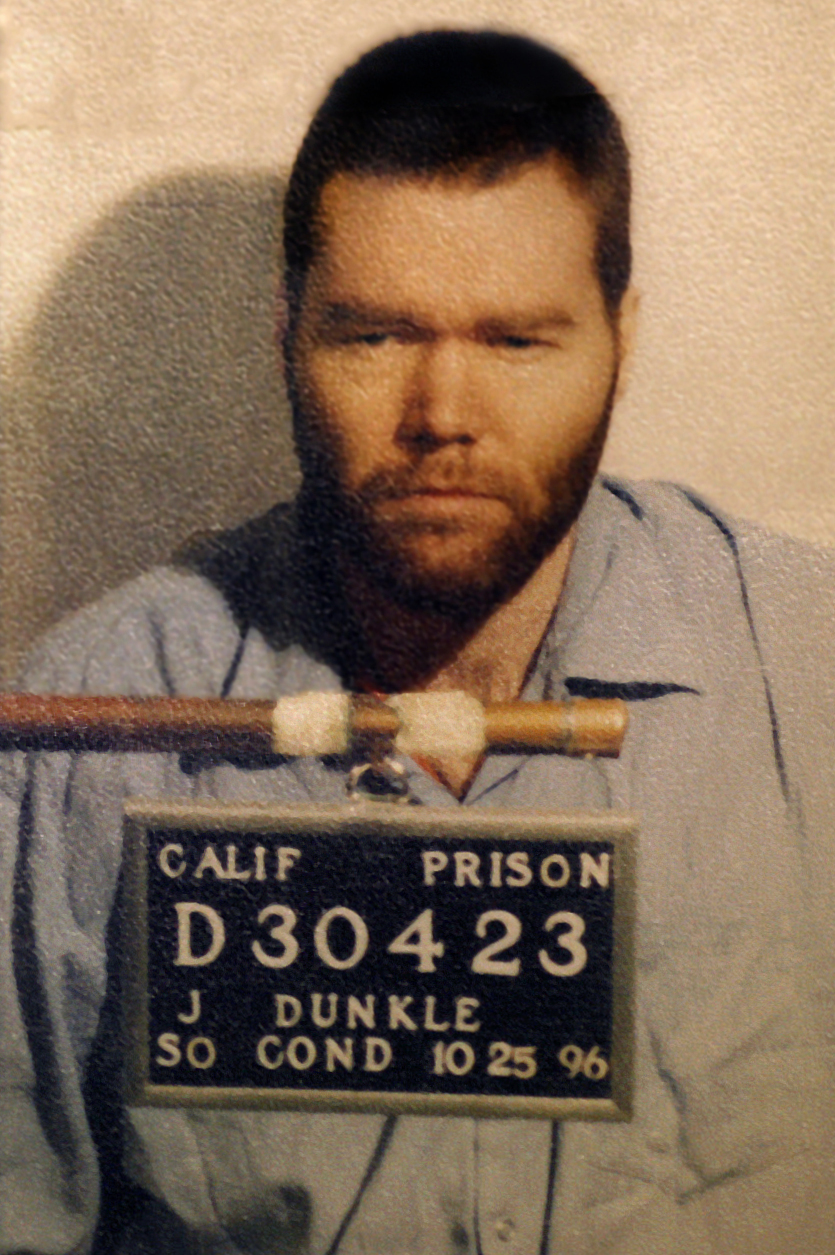
Dunkle in 1996

Dunkle was arrested for burglary on April 4, 1985, after he was seen entering a home in Rancho Cordova while under surveillance by the police department. In November, Dunkle was charged with felony hit-and-run after a transcript of a conversation between an undercover Belmont police officer and Dunkle was released, in which he admitted to being responsible for the incident involving Steve Murphy three years earlier.

For the burglary, Dunkle was sentenced to six years in prison, the maximum sentence, due to aggravated factors including four convictions for drunk driving, two hit-and-run incidents, and probation violations.

On December 7, 1989, Dunkle was found guilty of first-degree murder in the fatal stabbings of John Davies and Lance Turner. He was sentenced to death via the gas chamber on January 10, 1990. Nearly five years later, on December 30, 1994, Dunkle was sentenced to life imprisonment without parole for the murder of Sean Dannehl.

== Imprisonment ==
Dunkle has been diagnosed with acute schizophrenia. In 2016, the Los Angeles Times reported that Dunkle had been described as "gravely disabled", frequently banged his head against the wall, and was "said to believe he is controlled by computer chips and dies at night to become a new being". Dunkle was appointed a legal guardian in 2002.

On August 4, 2005, the Supreme Court voted unanimously to affirm Dunkle's death sentence.

== See also ==
- List of serial killers in the United States
- Capital punishment in California
- John Joubert
