= Green River Formation =

Geologic formation in the United States

- Stratigraphic range: Eocene, 53.5–48.5 Ma
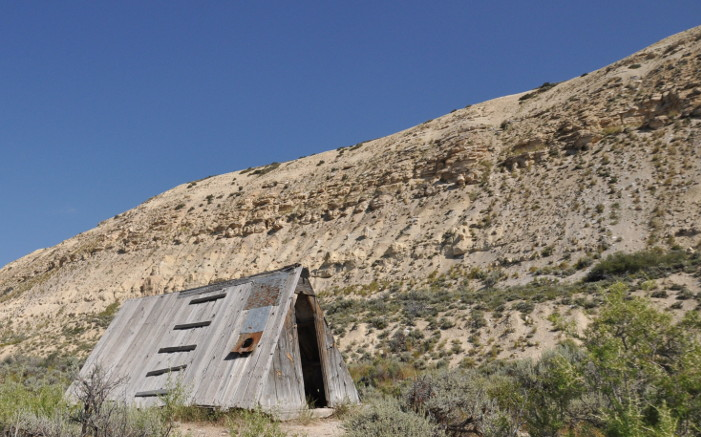
- Green River Formation exposed in the cliffs at Fossil Butte
- Type: Geological formation

Lithology
- Primary: varied
- Other: see text

Location
- Region: Colorado, Utah, Wyoming
- Country: United States

Type section
- Named for: Green River

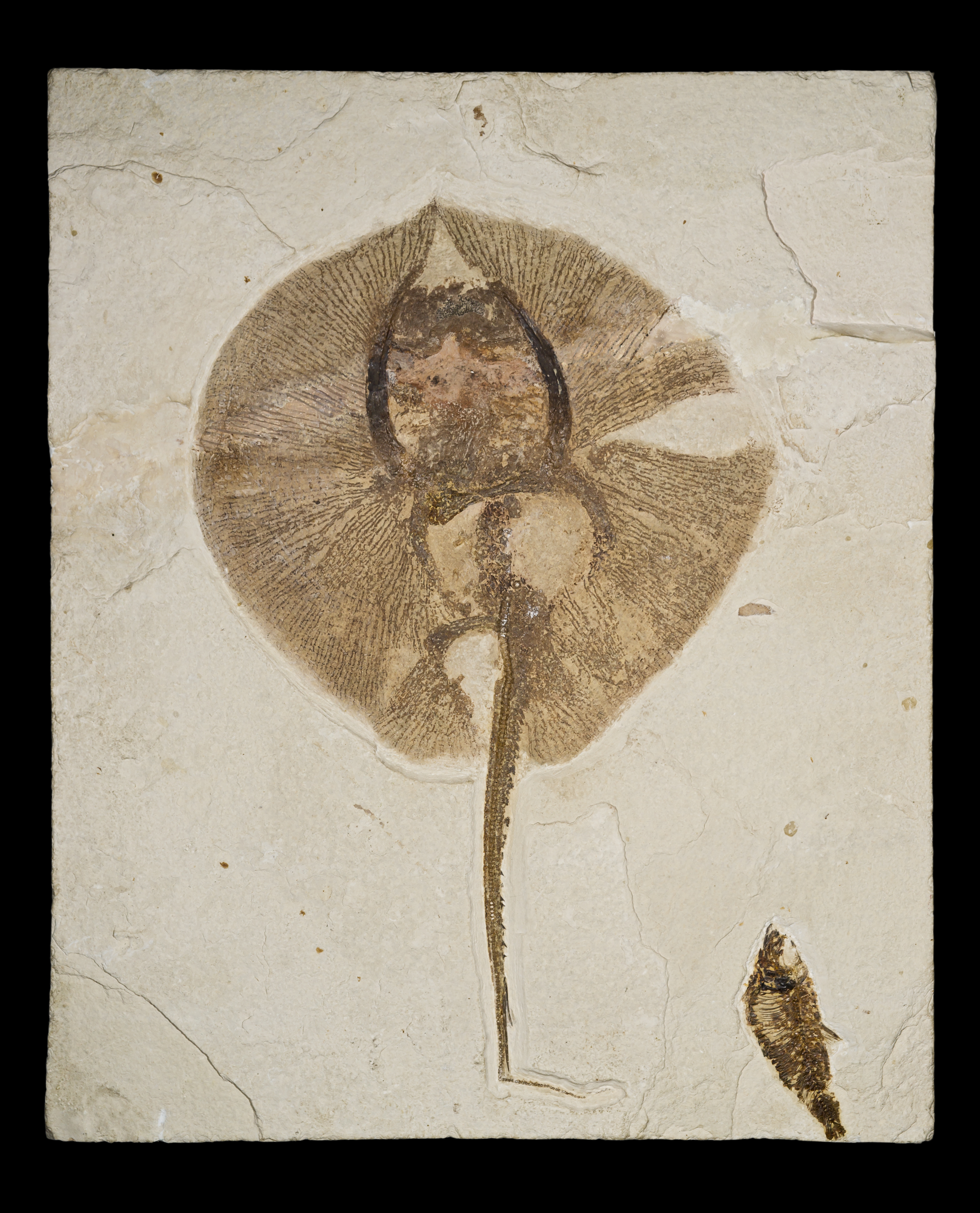
Heliobatis radians (stingray), Green River Formation, Fossil Butte National Monument

The Green River Formation is an Eocene geologic formation that records the sedimentation in a group of intermountain lakes in three basins along the present-day Green River in Colorado, Wyoming, and Utah. The sediments are deposited in very fine layers, a dark layer during the growing season and a light-hue inorganic layer in the dry season. Each pair of layers is called a varve and represents one year. The sediments of the Green River Formation present a continuous record of six million years. The mean thickness of a varve here is 0.18 mm, with a minimum thickness of 0.014 mm and maximum of 9.8 mm.

The sedimentary layers were formed in a large area named for the Green River, a tributary of the Colorado River. The three separate basins lie around the Uinta Mountains (north, east, and south) of northeastern Utah:

- an area in northwestern Colorado east of the Uintas
- a larger area in the southwest corner of Wyoming just north of the Uintas known as Lake Gosiute
- the largest area, in northeastern Utah and western Colorado south of the Uintas, known as Lake Uinta

Fossil Butte National Monument in Lincoln County, Wyoming, is in a part of the formation known as Fossil Lake because of its abundance of exceptionally well-preserved fish fossils.

== Lithology and formation ==
The formation of intermontane basin / lake environments during the Eocene resulted from mountain building and uplift of the Rocky Mountains (late Cretaceous Sevier orogeny and the Paleogene Laramide orogeny). Tectonic highlands supplied the Eocene sedimentary basins with sediment from all directions: the Uinta Mountains in the center; the Wind River Range to the north; the Front Range, Park Range and Sawatch Range of the Colorado Rockies to the east; the Uncompahgre Plateau and the San Juan Mountains to the south and finally, the Wasatch Mountains of Utah and the ranges of eastern Idaho to the west.

The lithology of the lake sediments is varied and includes sandstones, mudstones, siltstones, oil shales, coal beds, saline evaporite beds, and a variety of lacustrine limestones and dolomites. Volcanic ash layers within the various sediments from the then active Absaroka Volcanic field to the north in the vicinity of Yellowstone and the San Juan volcanic field to the southeast provide dateable horizons within the sediments.

The trona (hydrated sodium bicarbonate carbonate) beds of Sweetwater County, Wyoming are noted for a variety of rare evaporite minerals. The Green River Formation, is the type locality for eight rare minerals: bradleyite, ewaldite, loughlinite, mckelveyite-(Y), norsethite, paralabuntsovite-Mg, shortite and wegscheiderite. It also has a natural occurrence of moissanite (SiC) and 23 other valid mineral species.

=== Cyclicity ===
The beds display a pronounced cyclicity, with the precession, obliquity, and eccentricity orbital components all clearly detectable. This enables the beds to be internally dated with a high degree of accuracy, and astrochronological dates agree very well with radiometric dates.

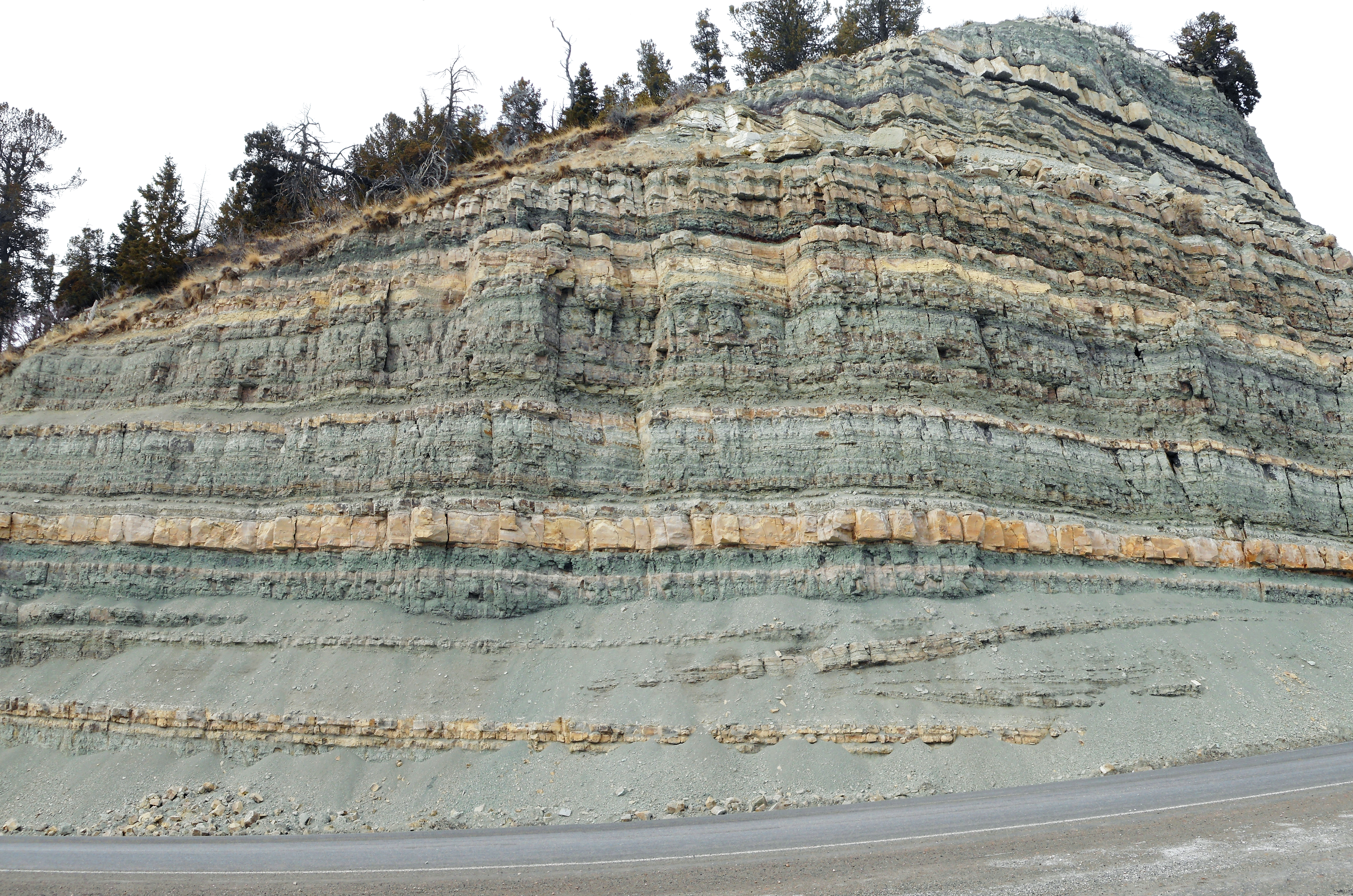
Unnamed middle member, Green River Formation along U.S. Highway 191 near Indian Canyon Summit, Duchesne County, Utah

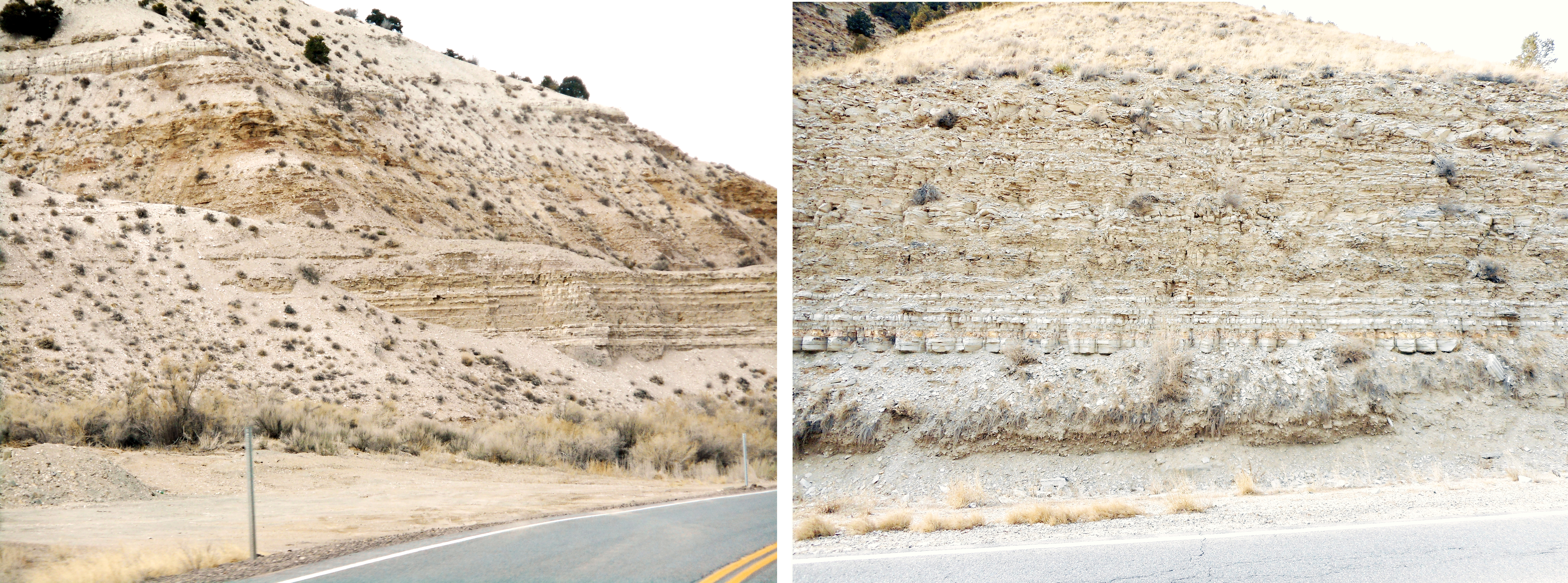
Unnamed upper member, saline facies, Green River Formation, along U.S. Highway 191 in lower Indian Canyon, Duchesne County, Utah. Left: typical exposure; right: exposure in roadcut.

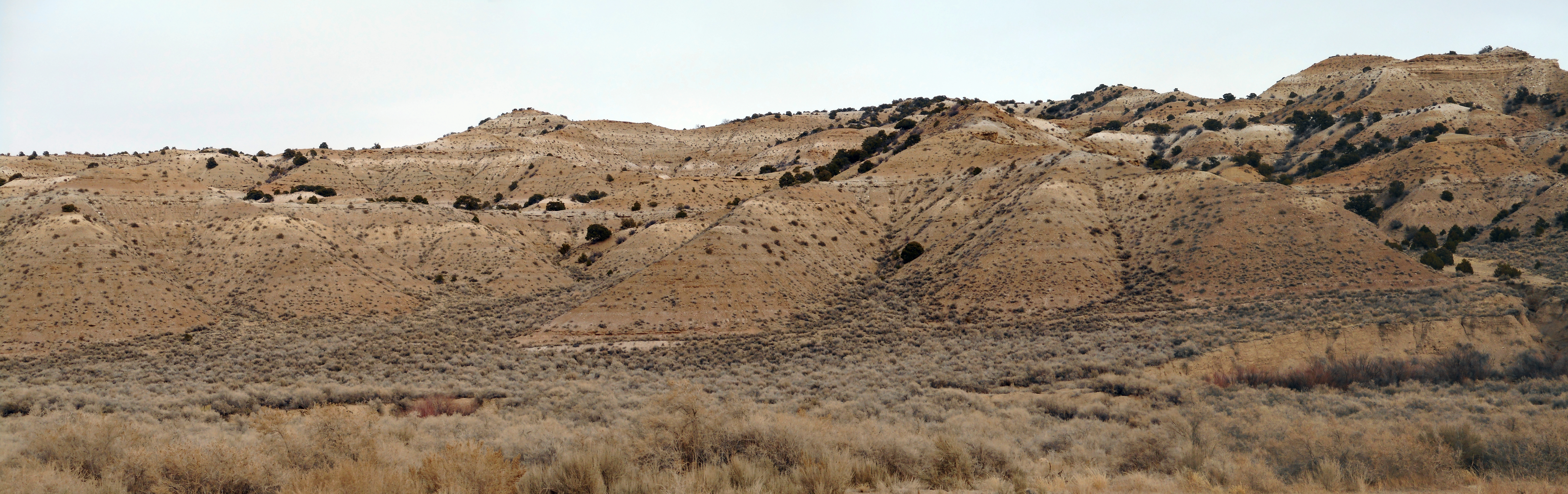
Transition facies, unnamed upper member of the Green River Formation along U.S. Highway 191, lower Indian Canyon, Duschesne County, Utah

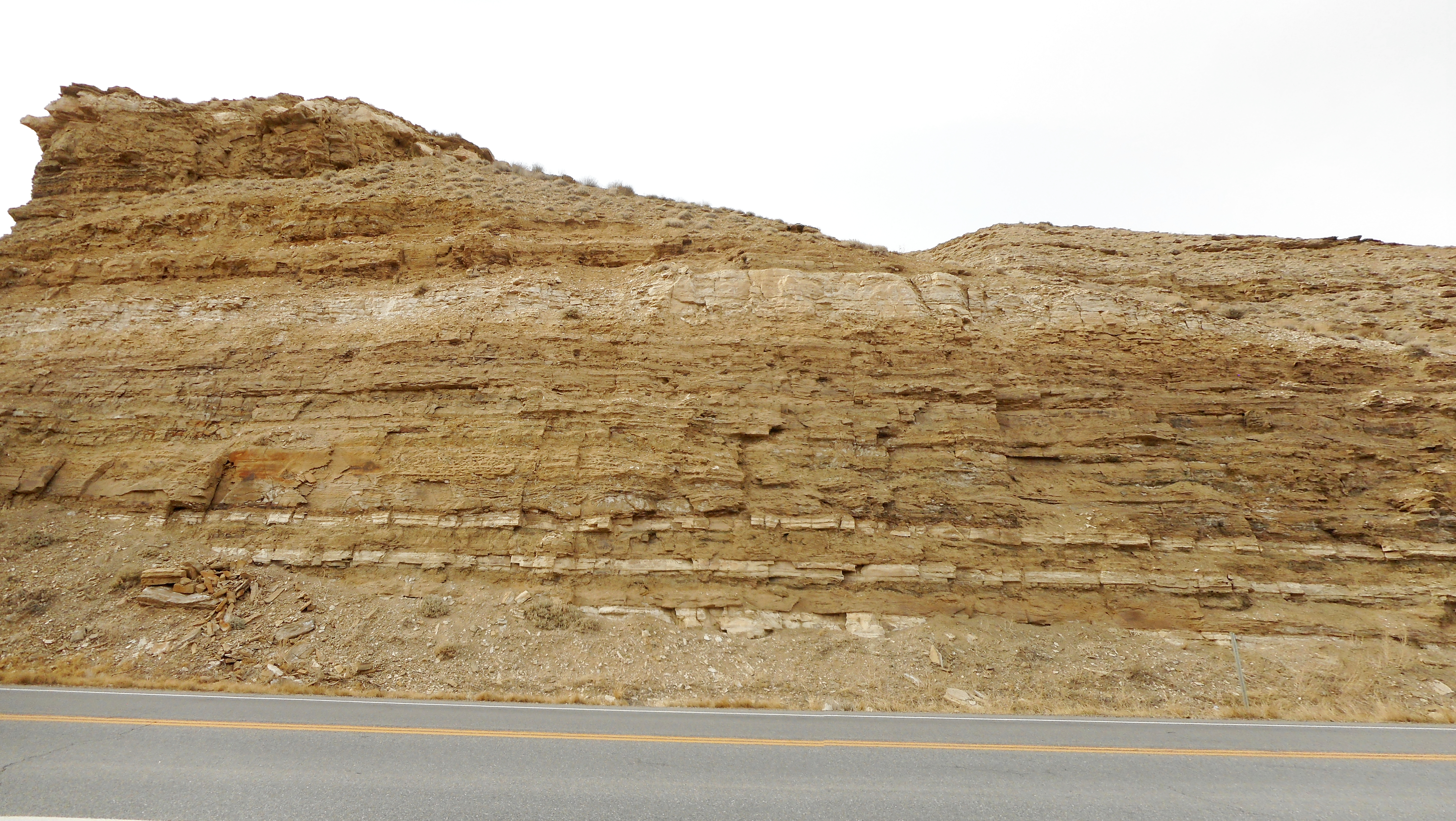
Tranisition facies exposed in road cut along U.S. Highway 191, lower Indian Canyon, Duchesne County, Utah

== Fossil zones ==
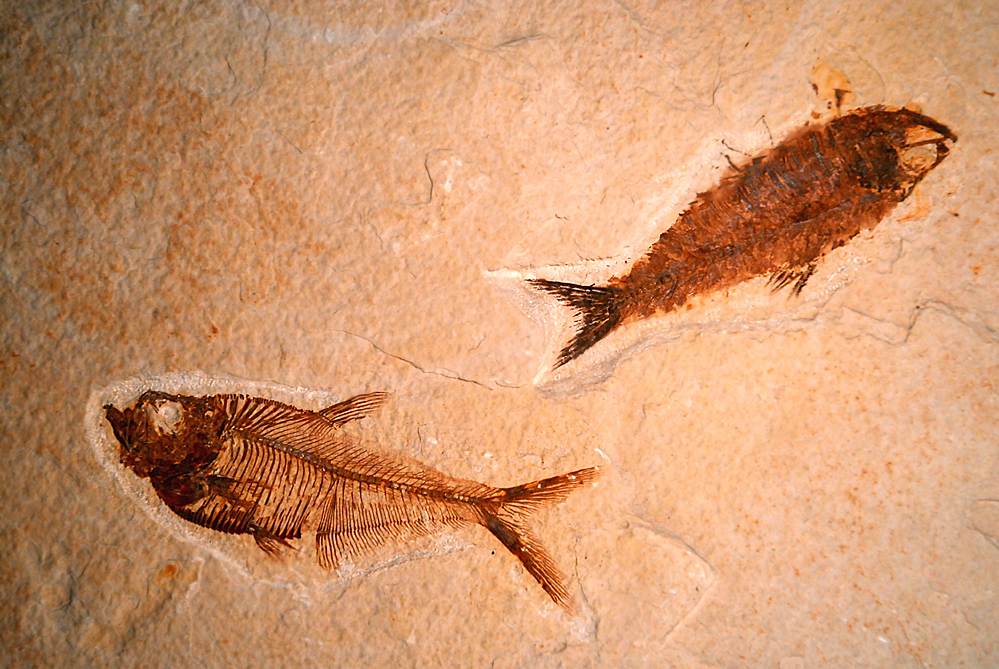
Diplomystus (left) and Knightia (right), two fossil fish from one of the lake beds in the Green River Formation

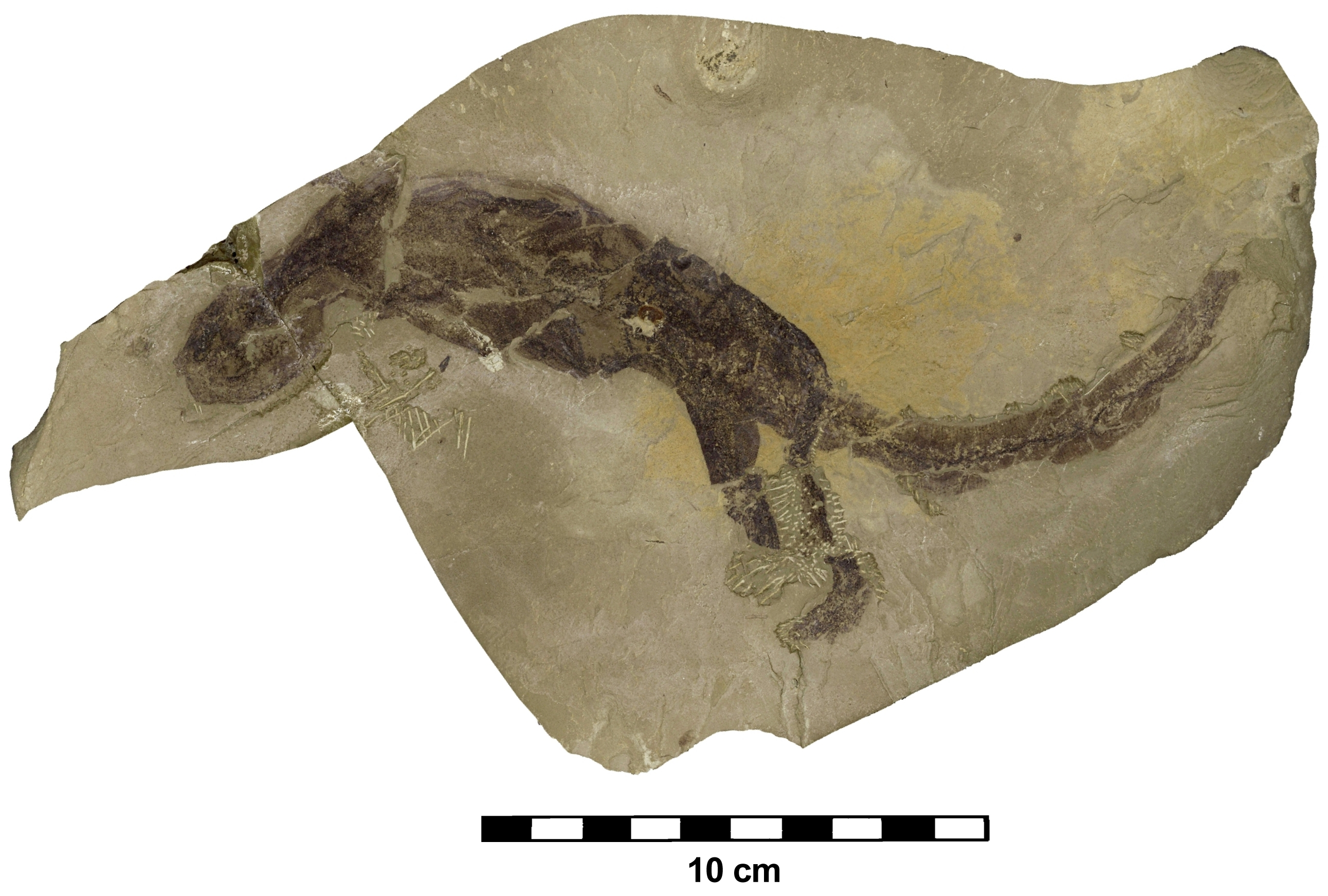
Crocodile lizard (Shinisauridae) preserved as a mineralized film; Parachute Creek Member in the Uintah Basin, Utah

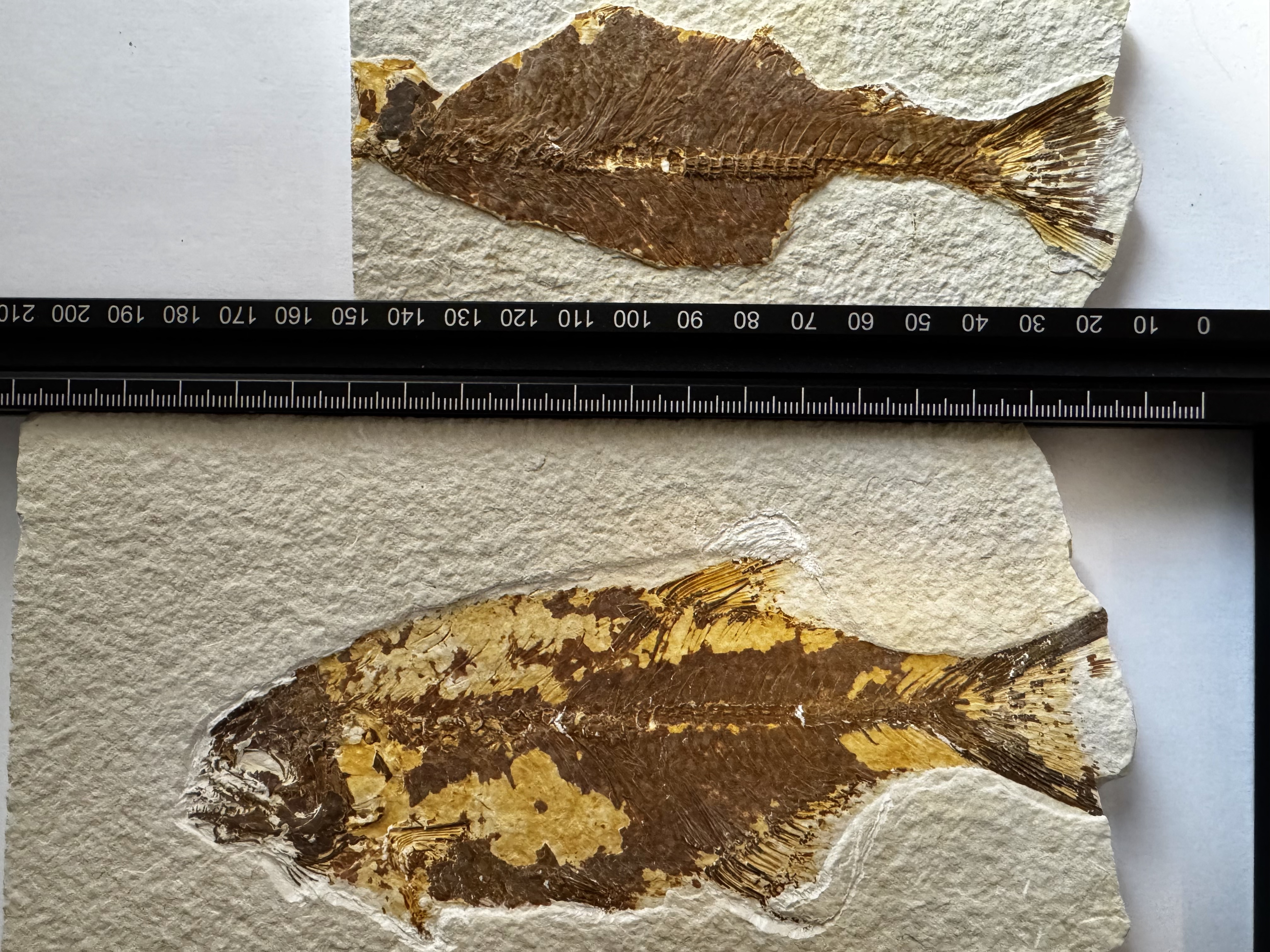
The positive and negative plates of a Hiodon falcatus (mooneye) fossil from the Green River Formation

Within the Green River Formation of southwest Wyoming in the area known as Fossil Lake, two distinct zones of very fine-grained lime muds are particularly noted for preserving a variety of complete and detailed fossils. These layers are an Eocene Lagerstätte, a rare place where conditions were right for a rich accumulation of undisturbed fossils. The most productive zone—called the split fish layer—consists of a series of laminated or varved lime muds about 6 ft (1.8 m) thick, which contains abundant fish and other fossils. These are easily split along the layers to reveal the fossils. This thin zone represents some 4000 years of deposition. The second fossil zone, the 18 inch layer, is an unlaminated layer about 18 in (46 cm) thick that also contains abundant detailed fossils, but is harder to work because it is not composed of fissile laminae.

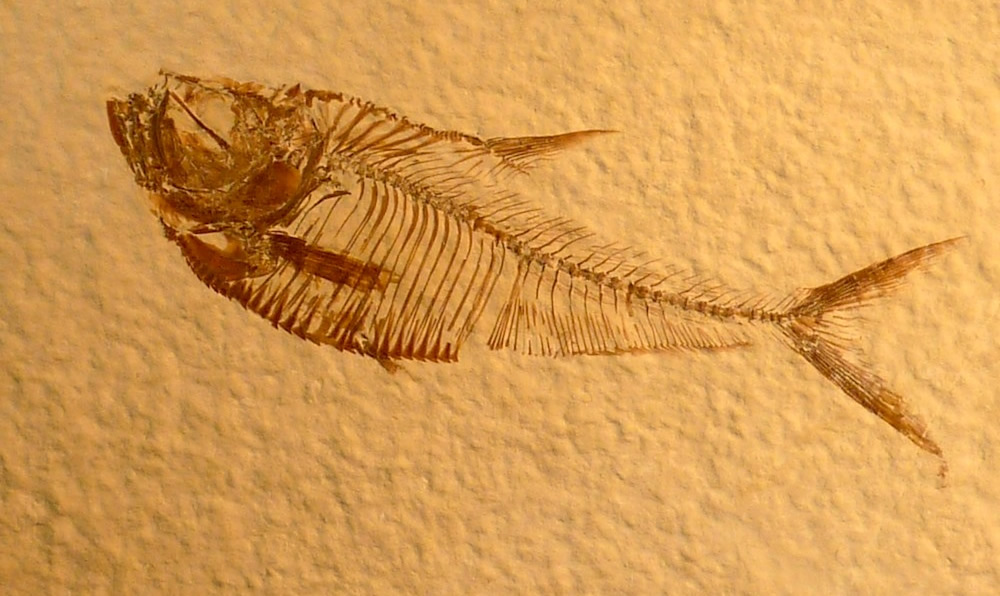
Diplomystus dentatus from the Green River Formation Split Fish Layer

The limestone matrix is so fine-grained that fossils include rare soft parts of complete insects and fallen leaves in spectacular detail. Some 35,000 fossiliferous rocks from the Green River Formation are housed at the Smithsonian Institution in Washington, D.C.

Fish fossils of Knightia are common in Fossil Lake, Lake Uinta, and Lake Gosiute, while those of Diplomystus are present across all three lakes but common only in Fossil Lake. Fossils of catfish (Ictaluridae and Hypsidoridae) are common in Lake Gosiute, rarer in Lake Uinta, and nearly unknown in Fossil Lake; suckers (Catostomidae) are only known from Lake Gosiute. The catfish are found mostly in the deepest parts of the lake. Percopsid sand-roller relatives are known from all three lakes, however Amphiplaga is strictly found in Fossil lake only, while Erismatopterus is uncommon in Lake Uinta but common in certain mass mortality layers of Lake Gosiute and absent from Fossil Lake.

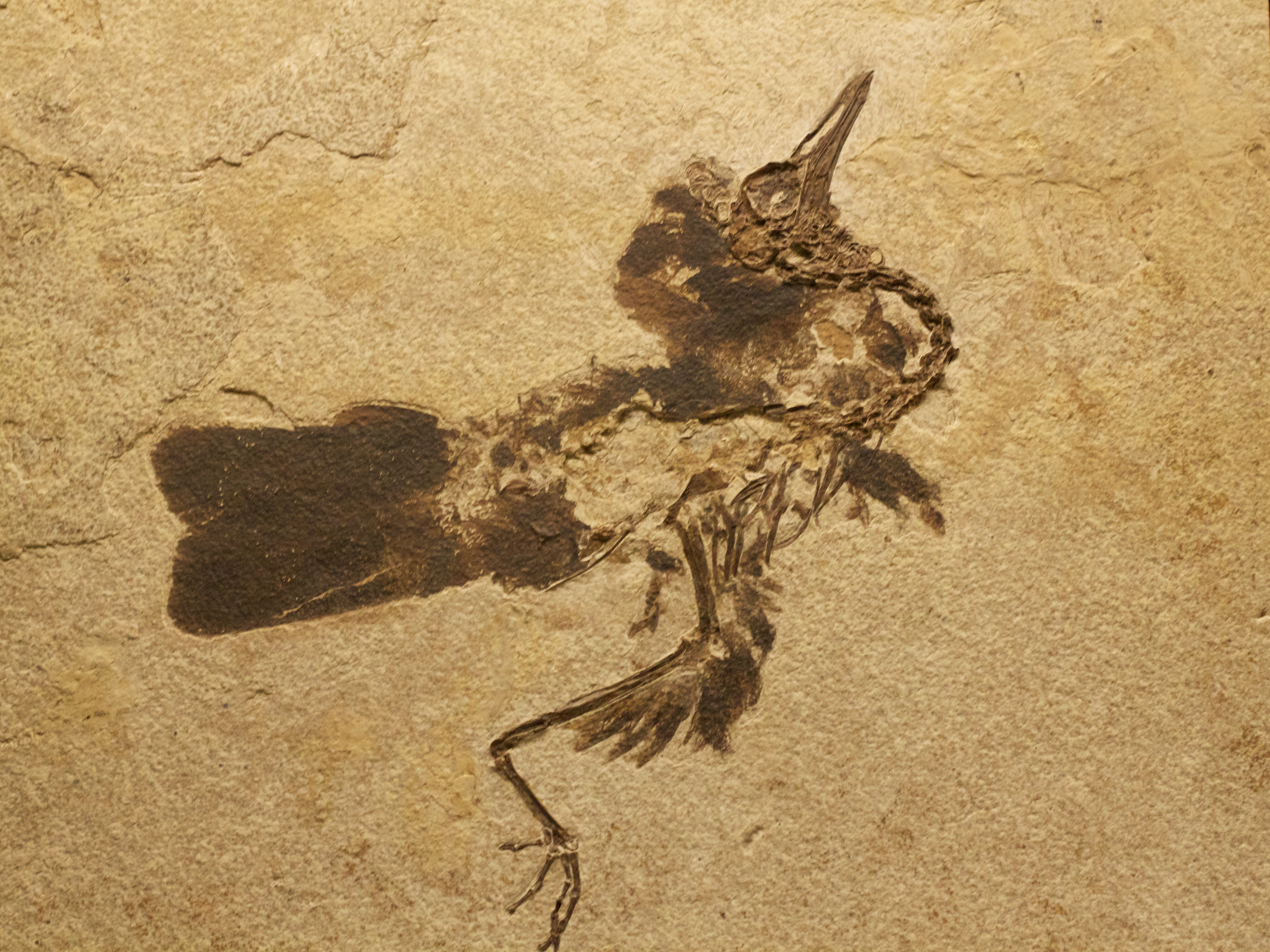
Nahmavis, a bird from the Green River Formation with preserved feathers

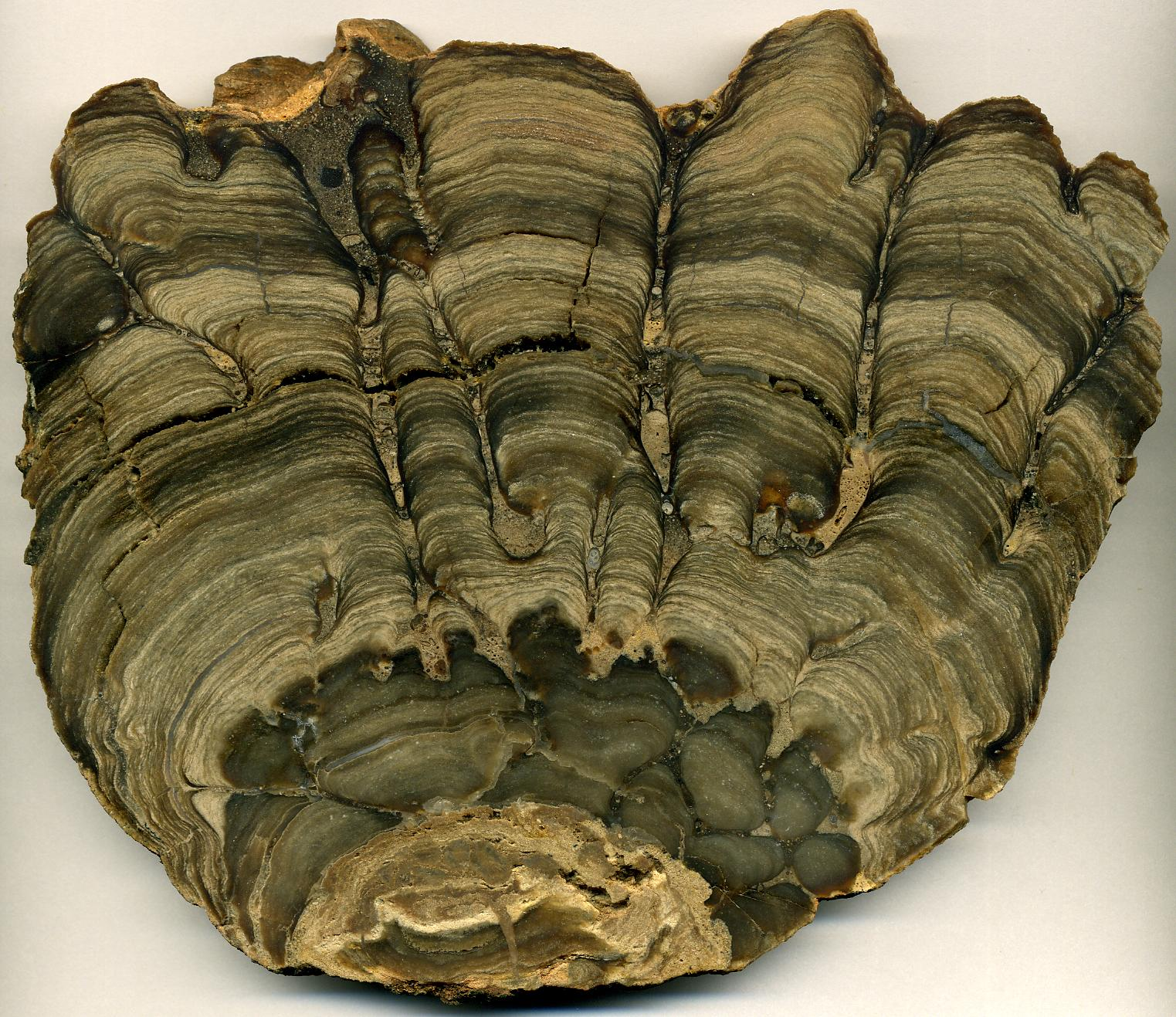
Stromatolite fossil from the Eocene Lake Gosuite, Laney Member, Green River Formation of south-western Wyoming

The various fossil beds of the Green River Formation span a 5 million year period, dating to between 53.5 and 48.5 million years old. This span of time includes the transition between the moist early Eocene climate and the slightly drier mid-Eocene. The climate was moist and mild enough to support crocodiles, which do not tolerate frost, and the lakes were surrounded by sycamore ( e.g. Platanus wyomingensis) forests. As the lake configurations shifted, each Green River location is distinct in character and time. The lake system formed over underlying river deltas and shifted in the flat landscape with slight tectonic movements, receiving sediments from the Uinta highland and the Rocky Mountains to the east and north. The Lagerstätten formed in anoxic conditions in the fine carbonate muds that formed in the lakebeds. Lack of oxygen slowed bacterial decomposition and kept scavengers away, so leaves of palms, ferns and sycamores, some showing the insect damage they had sustained during their growth, were covered with fine-grained sediment and preserved. Insects were preserved whole, even delicate wing membranes and spider spinnerets.

Vertebrates were preserved too, including the osteoderms of Borealosuchus, the crocodile that was an early clue to the mild Eocene climate of Western North America. Fish are common. The fossils of the herring-like Knightia, sometimes in dense layers, as if a school had wandered into anoxic water levels and were overcome, are familiar to fossil-lovers and are among the most commonly available fossils on the commercial market. There were two genera of indigenous freshwater stingray, Heliobatis and Asterotrygon. Approximately sixty vertebrate taxa in all have been found at Green River. Besides fishes they include at least eleven species of reptiles, and some birds and one armadillo-like mammal, Brachianodon westorum, with some scattered vertebrae of others, like the dog-sized Meniscotherium and Notharctus, one of the first primates. The earliest bats known from complete skeletons (Icaronycteris index , I. gunnelli, and Onychonycteris finneyi), already full-developed for flight, are found here. Even a snake, Boavus idelmani, found its way into a lake and was preserved in the mudstone.

=== Discovery of the fossil beds ===
The first documented records of (invertebrate) fossils from what is now called the Green River Formation are in the journals of early missionaries and explorers such as S. A. Parker, 1840, and J. C. Fremont, 1845. Geologist Dr. John Evans collected the first fossil fish, described as Clupea humilis (later renamed Knightia eocaena), from the Green River beds in 1856. Edward Drinker Cope collected extensively from the area and produced several publications on the fossil fish from 1870 onwards. Ferdinand Vandeveer Hayden (geologist-in-charge of the United States Geological and Geographical Survey of the Territories, the forerunner of the United States Geological Survey) first used the name "Green River Shales" for the fossil sites in 1869.

Millions of fish fossils have been collected from the area, commercial collectors operating from legal quarries on state and private land have been responsible for the majority of Green River vertebrate fossils in public and private collections all over the world.

== Oil shale ==
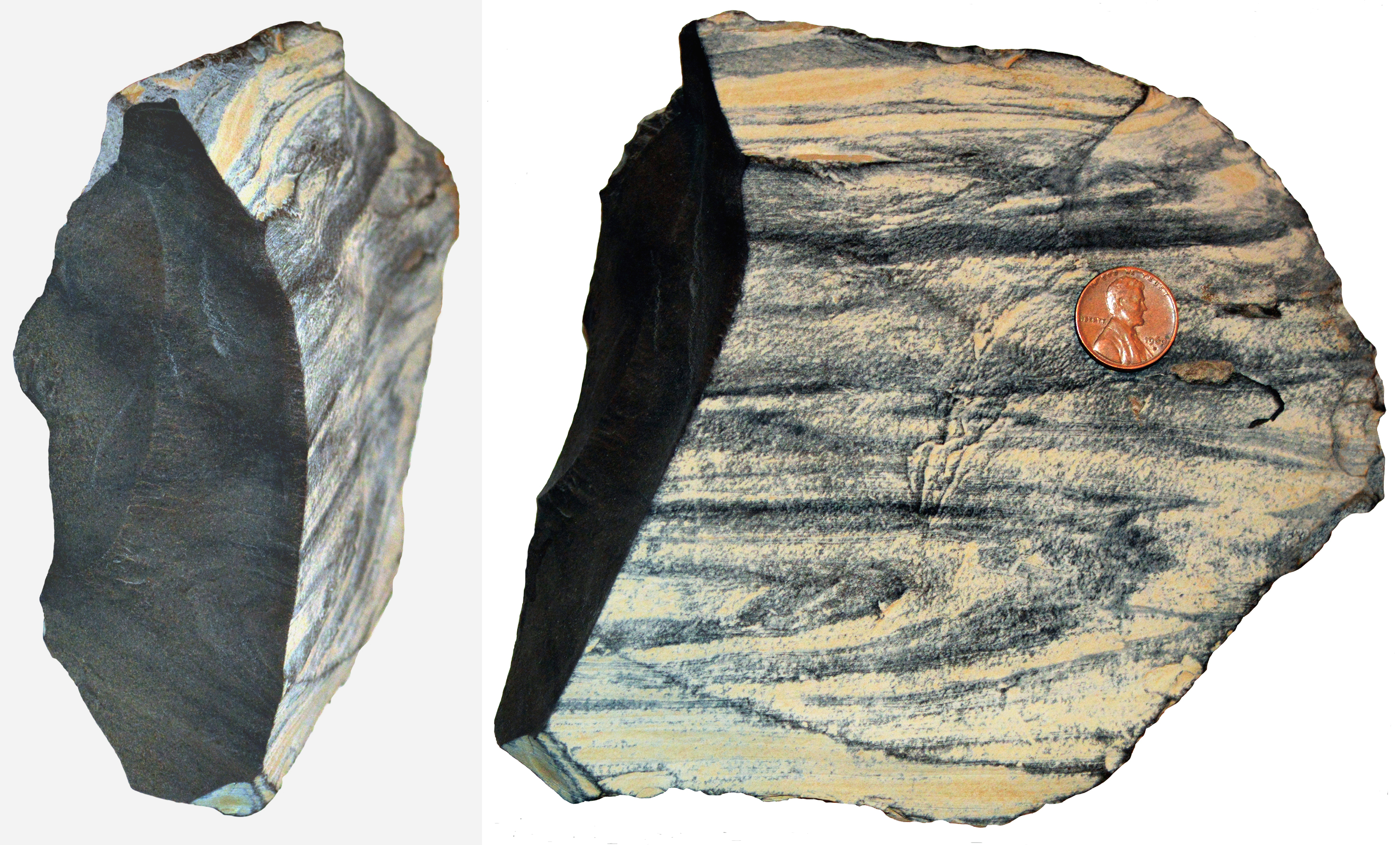
Oil Shale from the Mahogany Zone of the Green River Formation, Colorado. Weathered surface on right; fresh surface on left.

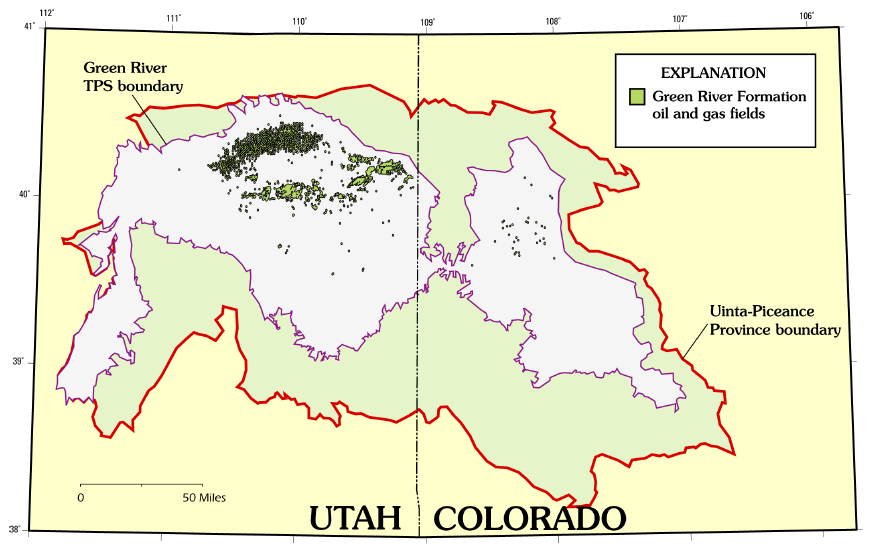
Green River Formation Oil Gas Fields within the Uinta Basin and Piceance Basin

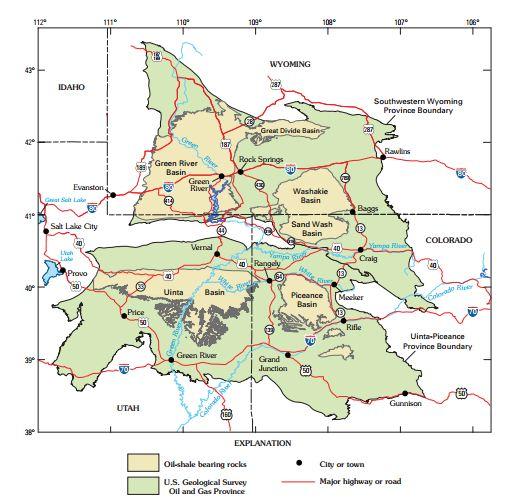
Areas of oil shale of the Green River Formation, Colorado, Utah, and Wyoming (USGS)

The Green River Formation contains the largest oil shale deposit in the world. It has been estimated that the oil shale reserves could equal up to 3 trillion barrels (480 billion cubic metres) of shale oil, up to half of which may be recoverable by shale oil extraction technologies (pyrolysis, hydrogenation, or thermal dissolution of kerogen in oil shale). However, the estimates of recoverable oil has been questioned, back in 2013, by geophysicist Raymond T. Pierrehumbert, who argued that the technology for recovering oil from the Green River oil shale deposit had not been developed and had not been profitably implemented at any significant scale.

Green River oil shale is lacustrine type lamosite. The organic matter is from blue-green algae (cyanobacteria).

== Mineral deposits ==
The unusual chemistry of the lakes in which it was deposited makes the Green River Formation a major source of sodium carbonate. In southwest Wyoming the formation contains the world's largest deposits of trona, and in Colorado, the world's largest deposits of nahcolite. Another unusual mineral, known only from Parachute Creek, is the crystalline nickel porphyrin mineral abelsonite.

== See also ==
- Florissant Formation (Florissant Fossil Beds National Monument), a similarly fossiliferous, but younger freshwater Eocene formation in the Colorado Rocky Mountains.
- History of the oil shale industry in the United States
- Lagerstätte
- List of fossil sites (with link directory)
