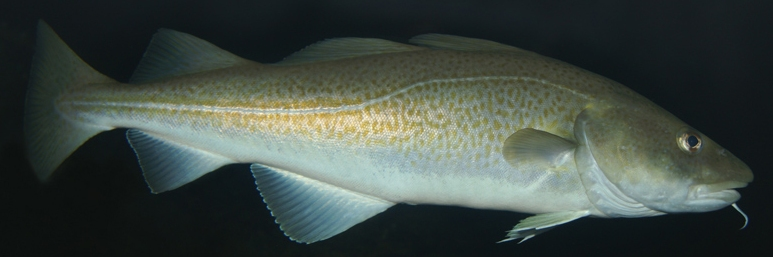
- Atlantic cod (Gadus morhua)

Scientific classification
- Kingdom: Animalia
- Phylum: Chordata
- Class: Actinopterygii
- Clade: Paracanthomorphacea
- Superorder: Paracanthopterygii; Greenwood et al.,1966

Orders
- †Trebiciania †Sphenocephaliformes; Percopsiformes; Zeiformes; Stylephoriformes; Gadiformes

= Paracanthopterygii =

Paracanthopterygii Temporal range: Cenomanian–present

Superorder of fishes

Paracanthopterygii is a superorder of fishes. Members of this group are called paracanthopterygians.

The oldest members are known as fossils from the Cenomanian.

It includes four orders:

- †Sphenocephaliformes
- Percopsiformes (trout-perches & allies)
- Zeiformes (dories)
- Gadiformes (cods & allies, including Stylephoriformes)

The indeterminate fossil marine paracanthopterygian †Trebiciania Sorbini & Bannikov, 1996, the only member of the family Trebicianiidae, is known from the Early Paleocene of Italy.
