= Margaret Dunkle =

American activist who created Title IX

- Born: Margaret Claire Dunkle; 1947 (age 78–79); Maryland, U.S.
- Education: Syracuse University
- Occupations: Activist, scientist

Margaret Dunkle created regulations for Title IX, the legislation that prohibits sex discrimination in schools and colleges receiving federal funding.

== Introduction ==
Margaret Claire Dunkle (b. 1947) was born in Maryland. She has a Bachelors from Syracuse University.

== Awards and recognition ==
In 2012 Dunkle was inducted into the Maryland Women’s Hall of Fame. In 2017 she was selected as one of Maryland’s 100 Top Women. She was also the recipient of the American Academy of Pediatrics’ Dale Richmond Award for outstanding achievement in the field of child development and Vice President Al Gore’s “reinventing government” Hammer Award. In 2018 she was chosen by the National Women's History Project as one of its honorees for Women's History Month in the United States.

== Academic positions ==
Dunkle’s positions include:

- Lead Research Scientist at the George Washington School of Public Health’s Department of Health Policy;
- Chairperson of the Harriet Elizabeth Brown Commemoration Task Force;
- Director of the Early Identification and Intervention Collaborative for Los Angeles County
- Chair of the Calvert County Commission for Women
- Member of the College of Southern Maryland Board of Trustees

== Legal achievements ==
In 1986, Dunkle conceptualized the federal provision enabling low-income women to receive student financial aid without losing welfare or health insurance. She also guided the development of the 1980 Science and Technology Equal Opportunities Act.

== Publications ==
Dunkle has written (and co-written) many books. These include: ‘Conservation: A Thoughtful Way of Explaining Conservation to Children,’ Secrets of the Rainforest,’ ‘Linking Schools with Health & Social Services: Perspectives from Thomas Payzant on San Diego’s New Beginnings,’ ‘The Story Makers: A Collection of Interviews with Australian and New Zealand Authors and Illustrators for Young People’ and ‘Black in Focus: A Guide to Aboriginality in Literature for Young People.’
