= Dunkel (disambiguation) =

Dunkel, German for "dark", is a group of German lager styles.

Dunkel may also refer to:

- Dunkel (surname)
- Dunkel, Illinois, an unincorporated community in Christian County
- Dunkel System, a rating system for American college football teams

== See also ==
- Dunkels
