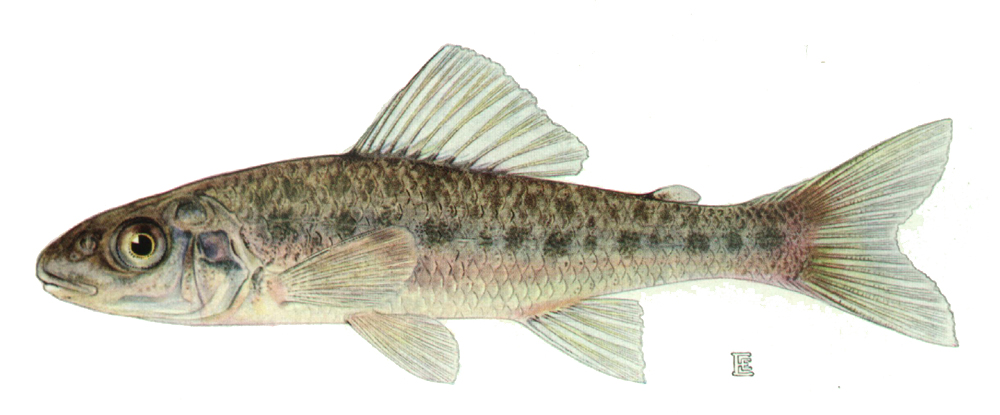
- Trout-perch (P. omiscomaycus)

Scientific classification
- Kingdom: Animalia
- Phylum: Chordata
- Class: Actinopterygii
- Order: Percopsiformes
- Family: Percopsidae
- Genus: Percopsis; Agassiz, 1849

= Percopsis =

Genus of fishes

Percopsis is a small genus of percopsiform fishes native to North America, with these two recognized species:

- Percopsis omiscomaycus (Walbaum, 1792) (trout-perch)
- Percopsis transmontana (C. H. Eigenmann & R. S. Eigenmann, 1892) (sand roller)
