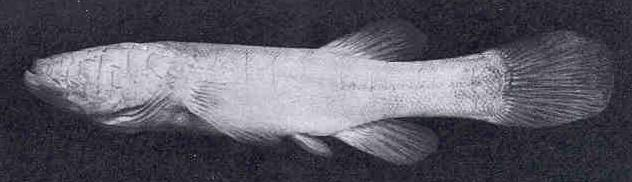
- Northern cavefish

Scientific classification
- Kingdom: Animalia
- Phylum: Chordata
- Class: Actinopterygii
- Superorder: Paracanthopterygii
- Order: Percopsiformes; L. S. Berg, 1940

Type species
- Percopsis omiscomaycus (Walbaum, 1792)

Families
- Amblyopsidae (cavefishes); Aphredoderidae (pirate perches); Percopsidae (trout-perches)

Synonyms
- Percopsida; Salmopercae; Salmopercoidea; Heteropygii Tellkampf 1844

= Percopsiformes =

Percopsiformes Temporal range: Campanian–recent

Order of fishes

The Percopsiformes /pɜːrˈkɒpsɪfɔːrmiːz/ are a small order of freshwater teleost fishes measuring less than 20 cm (7.9 in) in length, comprising the trout-perch and its allies. It contains just ten extant species, grouped into seven genera and three families. Five of these genera are monotypic.

They inhabit freshwater habitats in North America, and fossil evidence indicates that they have inhabited this region since the Late Cretaceous, with both suborders having diverged by the Maastrichtian. Most species in this order are known from the eastern and central regions of North America, although the two Percopsis species have a primarily boreal and western distribution, with P. omiscomaycus reaching as far north as the Arctic Circle and P. transmontana being restricted to the Pacific Northwest.

They are generally small fish, ranging from 5 to 20 cm (2.0 to 7.9 in) in adult body length. They are grouped together because of technical characteristics of their internal anatomy, and the different species may appear quite different externally. Despite their scientific name and the common names for some taxa, they are not closely related to actual perches in the order Perciformes, and rather represent a freshwater lineage of the otherwise almost entirely marine superorder Paracanthopterygii. They are more closely related to the cods, dories, and the deep-sea tube-eye, and fossil evidence suggests that their closest relative was the extinct order Sphenocephaliformes, comprising two enigmatic genera of Late Cretaceous marine fish, as well as Omosomopsis, another Cretaceous marine fish from Morocco.

== Classification ==
- Order Percopsiformes Berg 1937
  - Genus †Lateopisciculus Murray & Wilson 1996
  - Genus †Percopsiformorum [Otolith]
  - Suborder Percopsoidei Berg 1937
    - Genus †Lindoeichthys (Late Cretaceous of Canada)
    - Family Percopsidae Regan 1911 [Percopsides Agassiz 1850; Erismatopteridae Jordan 1905 †Libotoniidae Grande, 1988]
      - Genus †Amphiplaga Cope 1877
      - Genus †Erismatopterus Cope 1870
      - Genus †Libotonius Wilson 1977
      - Genus †Massamorichthys Murray 1996
      - Genus Percopsis Agassiz 1849 [Columbia Eigenmann & Eigenmann 1892 non Rang 1834; Columatilla Whitley 1940; Salmoperca Thompson 1850]
  - Suborder Aphredoderoidei Berg 1937 [Amblyopsoidei Regan 1911; Aphredoderoidea; Amblyopsoidea]
    - Family Aphredoderidae Bonaparte 1832 (Pirate perches)
      - Genus Aphredoderus Lesueur 1833 ex Cuvier & Valenciennes 1833 [Sternotremia Nelson 1876; Asternotremia Nelson ex Jordan 1877]
    - Family Amblyopsidae Bonaparte 1832 [Hypsaeidae Storer 1846] (Cavefishes)
      - Genus Typhlichthys Girard 1859 (Southern cavefish)
      - Genus Speoplatyrhinus Cooper & Kuehne 1974 (Alabama cavefish)
      - Genus Forbesichthys Jordan 1929 [Forbesella Jordan & Evermann 1927 non Herdman 1891 non Lacaze-Duthiers & Delage 1892] (Spring cavefish)
      - Genus Chologaster Agassiz 1853 (Swampfish)
      - Genus Amblyopsis de Kay 1842 [Poecilosomus Swainson 1839]
      - Genus Troglichthys Eigenmann 1899 (Ozark cavefish)
