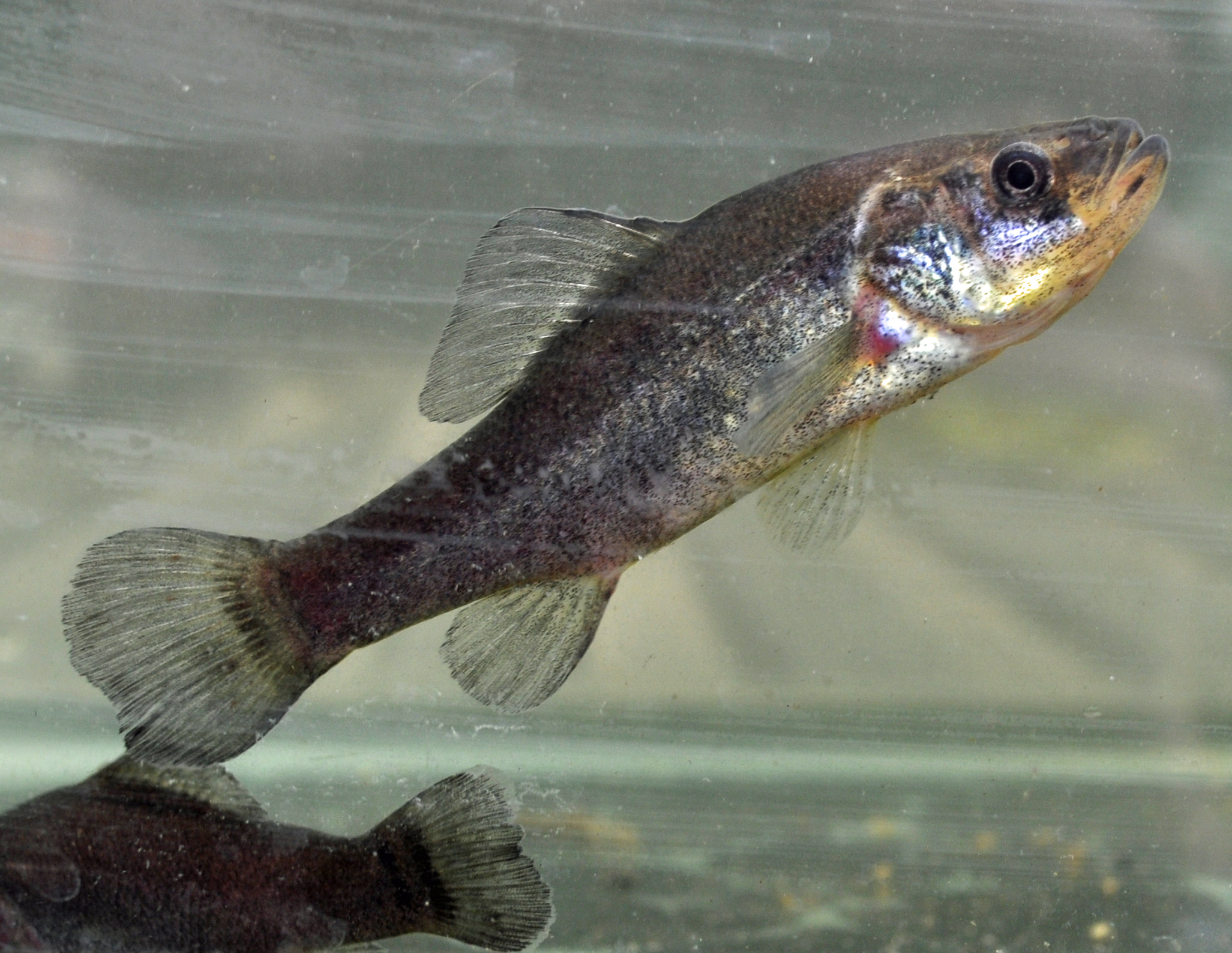
- Pirate perch (A. sayanus)

Scientific classification
- Kingdom: Animalia
- Phylum: Chordata
- Class: Actinopterygii
- Order: Percopsiformes
- Family: Aphredoderidae; Bonaparte, 1845
- Genus: Aphredoderus; Lesueur in Cuvier & Valenciennes, 1833

Synonyms
- Aphododerus Jordan, 1877; Asternotremia Nelson in Jordan, 1877; Sternotremia Nelson, 1876

= Aphredoderus =

Genus of fishes

Aphredoderus is a small genus of percopsiform fishes native to North America, with these five recognized species:

- Aphredoderus gibbosus Lesueur, 1833
- Aphredoderus mesotrema Jordan, 1877
- Aphredoderus ornatus Muller & Simons, 2024 (blackstripe pirate perch)
- Aphredoderus retrodorsalis Muller & Simons, 2024 (lowland pirate perch)
- Aphredoderus sayanus Gilliams, 1824 (yellowbelly pirate perch)

It is the only genus in the family Aphredoderidae.
