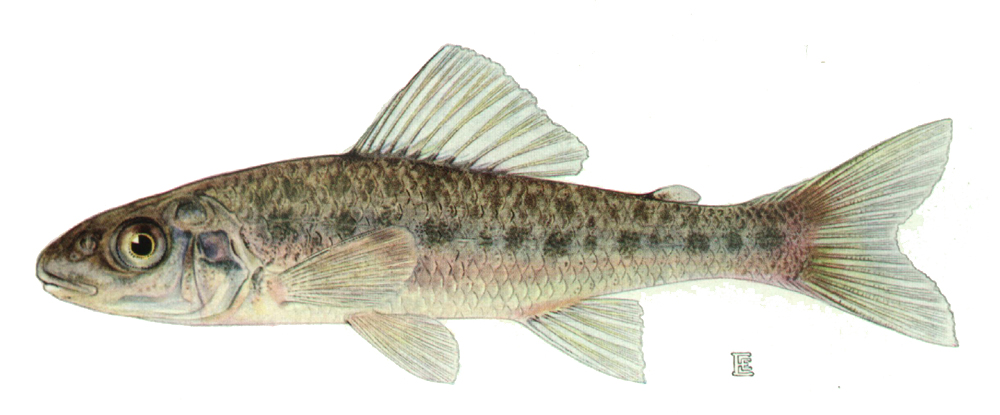
- Percopsis omiscomaycus

Scientific classification
- Kingdom: Animalia
- Phylum: Chordata
- Class: Actinopterygii
- Order: Percopsiformes
- Family: Percopsidae; Agassiz, 1850

Genera
- †Amphiplaga Cope, 1877; †Erismatopterus Cope, 1870; †Libotonius Wilson, 1978; †Lindoeichthys Murry et al., 2020; †Massamorichthys Murray, 1996; Percopsis Agassiz, 1849

Synonyms
- Libotoniidae Grande, 1988

= Percopsidae =

Percopsidae Temporal range: Maastrichtian–present

Family of fishes

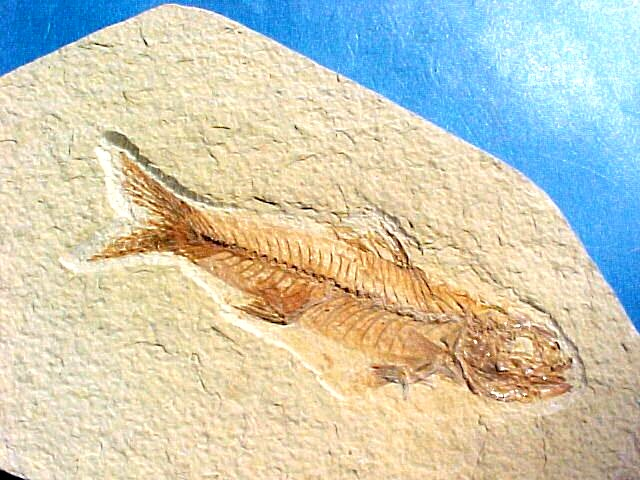
Amphiplaga brachyptera

Percopsidae is a family of fish in the order Percopsiformes, with one extant genus with two species, both endemic to North America, and five described fossil genera.

They are small fish with weak fin spines, and an adipose fin similar to those of trout. They feed on insects and small crustaceans.

This is an ancient family with fossil genera known as far back as the Maastrichtian. Many fossil genera appear during the Paleogene. All fossil percopsids are also known from the vicinity of North America, and almost all are known from freshwater habitats. However, a single well-preserved specimen of an apparent marine percopsid is known from the Middle Eocene of Cuba.
