= David Dunkle =

American paleontologist and biologist

- Born: David Hosbrook Dunkle; September 9, 1911; Winnipeg, Manitoba
- Died: January 3, 1984 (aged 72); Tappahannock, Virginia
- Scientific career
- Fields: Paleontology, Ichthyology

David Hosbrook Dunkle (September 9, 1911 – January 3, 1984) was an American paleontologist. Dunkle was curator of vertebrate paleontology for the Cleveland Museum of Natural History and later associate curator for the Smithsonian Museum of Natural History.

Dunkle's research and published works focused mainly on fish fossils. The genus Dunkleosteus is named in his honor.

== Biography ==
Dunkle was born in Winnipeg, Manitoba, and grew up in Indiana, United States. He attended the University of Kansas and Harvard University. At Harvard, he studied under Alfred Romer and earned a PhD in 1939. Afterwards, he worked at the Cleveland Museum of Natural History (CMNH) as a curator of vertebrate paleontology. There, he studied and published papers about arthrodires from the Cleveland area. In the 1940s, he led two trips to the west to bolster the museum's collection of fossils. A notable object he collected for the museum was CMNH 7541, a dinosaur skull upon which the controversial proposed genus Nanotyrannus is based on. After Dunkle collected the skull in 1942, it was first described as a new species in the tyrannosaur genus Gorgosaurus by Charles W. Gilmore in 1946.

In 1946, Dunkle left his post at the CMNH to work as associate curator of vertebrate paleontology at the Smithsonian Museum of Natural History, although he continued working with the CMNH. In the 1960s, he acted as a scientific consultant to the CMNH on an operation salvaging fossils from Interstate 71. He retired from the National Museum in March 1968 and worked at the CMNH until retiring in 1975.

After retirement, he moved to Burgess, Virginia. He died in Tappahannock on January 3, 1984. He was survived by his wife and daughter.

== Legacy ==
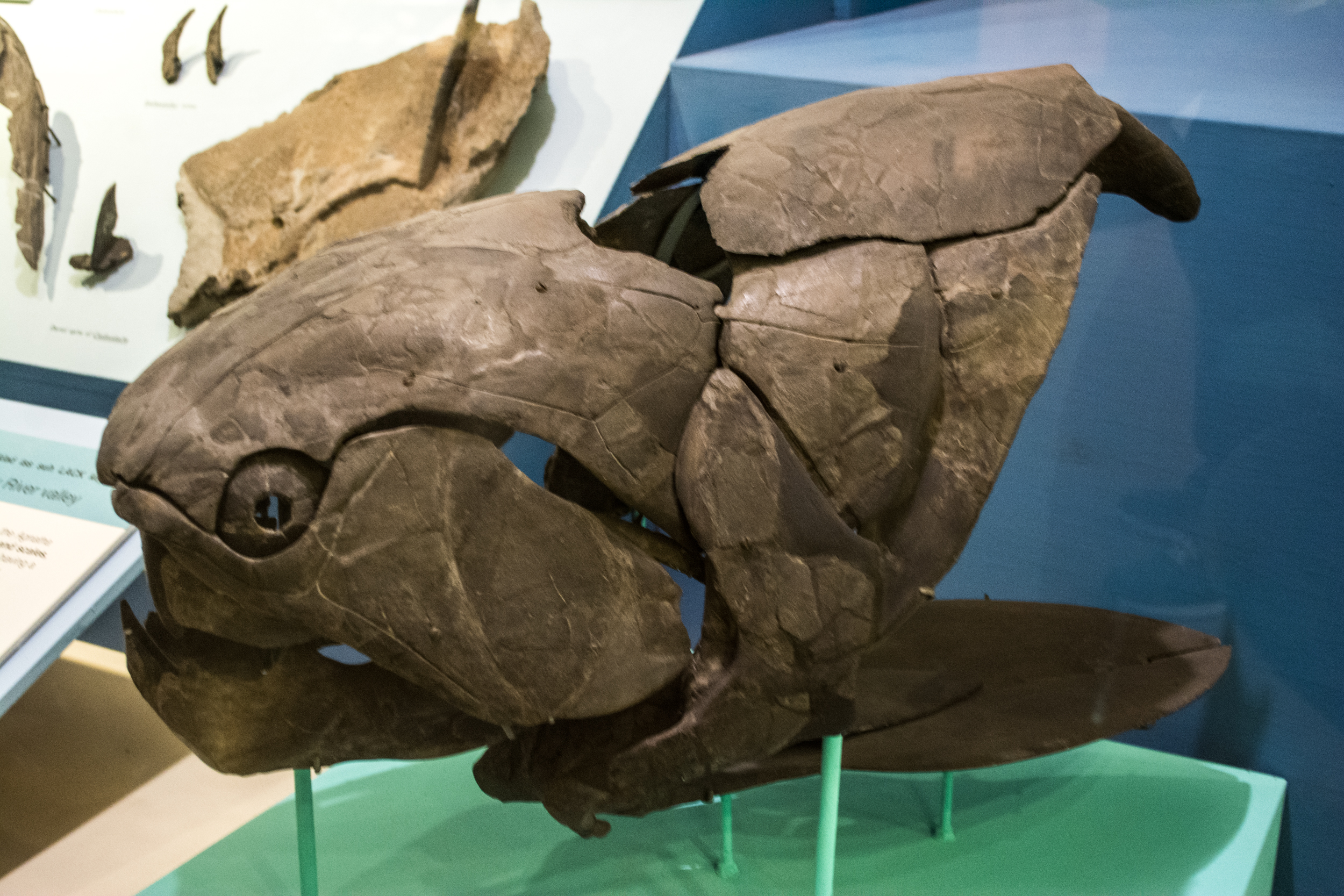
Juvenile Dunkleosteus terrelli skull, Cleveland Museum of Natural History

Through his lifetime, Dunkle published around fifty papers that mostly deal with the fossils of fish. The genus Dunkleosteus was named after him while still working at the CMNH, then as curator of vertebrate paleontology, in 1956.

== Selected publications ==
- Dunkle, David Hosbrook (November 1951). "New Western Hemisphere occurrences of fossil selachians". Journal of the Washington Academy of Sciences. 41 (11): 344–347.
- Dunkle, David Hosbrook; Bungart, Peter Anthony; Bull, Edith (1946). "The antero-supragnathal of Gorgonichthys. American Museum novitates; no. 1316". hdl:2246/2309.
- Schaeffer, Bobb; Dunkle, David Hosbrook; Walcott, Charles D. (1950). "A semionotid fish from the Chinle Formation, with consideration of its relationships. American Museum novitates; no. 1457". hdl:2246/2356.
