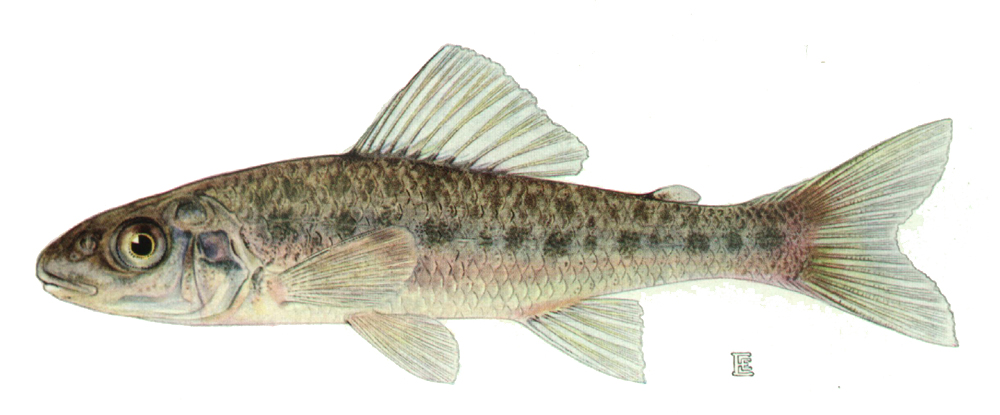

Conservation status
- Least Concern (IUCN 3.1)

Scientific classification
- Kingdom: Animalia
- Phylum: Chordata
- Class: Actinopterygii
- Division: Teleostei
- Order: Percopsiformes
- Family: Percopsidae
- Genus: Percopsis
- Species: P. omiscomaycus

Binomial name
- Percopsis omiscomaycus (Walbaum, 1792)

= Percopsis omiscomaycus =

Species of fish

Percopsis omiscomaycus, also known as the trout-perch, the grounder or the sand minnow, is one of two species in the family Percopsidae. Its name comes from the Greek root words perc, meaning perch and opsi meaning appearance. The species name omiscomaycus is thought to be derived from a Native American word meaning trout. These are freshwater fish that prefer clear to slightly turbid water, and are found in rivers and lakes throughout North America. They are a generally small fish found in deep waters by day, but which migrate to shallower waters at night.They are most often seen washed up on beaches and are rarely seen alive or correctly identified. The trout-perch possess characteristics similar to both the trout and the perch. They are an important source of food for many predator fish such as walleye, northern pike, and lake trout. They are not a major human fishery, but are occasionally used as a bait fish.

== Description ==
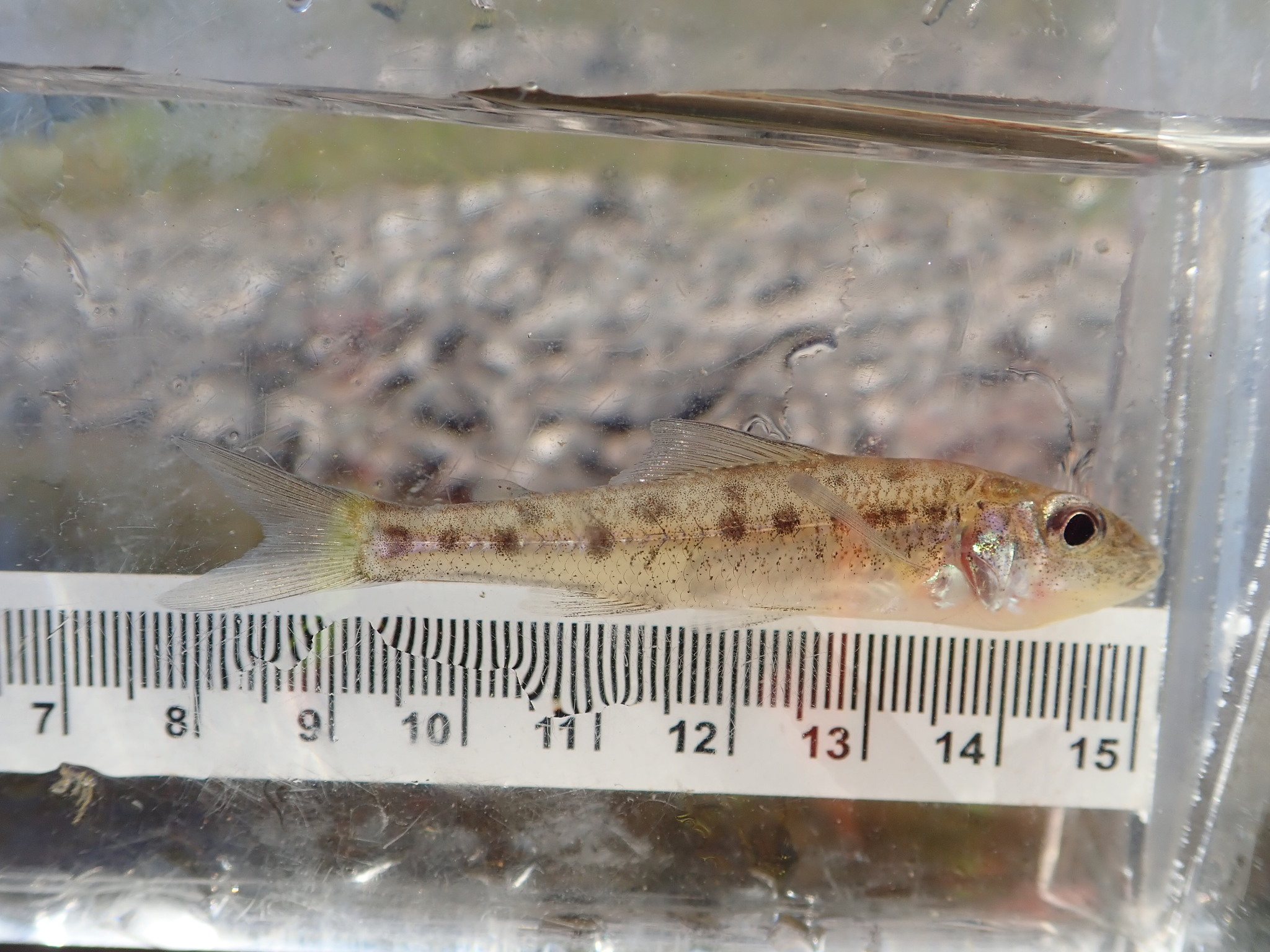

The trout-perch has been found at sizes of 20.0 centimetres (7.9 in) total length and the average total length is 8.8 centimetres (3.5 in). There are no distinguishing characteristics between males and females. They are overall silvery or nearly transparent in appearance with rows of dark spots on along the sides of their bodies both along their lateral line and above it. Their fins are almost entirely transparent. These fish have thick bodies with a long head, long snout, and a small mouth. They have a single dorsal fin containing 1–3 spines and 10–11 soft rays. They also have an adipose fin, similar to trout, which helps to distinguishes them from their look-alike species, the yellow perch and the walleye. Their tail or caudal fin is forked. Like most bony fish, the trout-perch has thin, flexible plates of bone or leptoid scales. Their particular leptoid scales are ctenoid scales that are similar to the perch's.

== Distribution and habitat ==
The trout-perch is found throughout North America, from Canada and Alaska to the Potomac River basin in Virginia. They are found in the Great Lakes region, as well as the Mississippi River Basin which extends its range to include: Iowa, Missouri, Kentucky, Tennessee, Arkansas, Mississippi, and Louisiana. They have also been spotted in North Dakota, Montana and West Virginia.

Trout-perch prefer clear to slightly turbid water with sandy and gravelly bottoms. They avoid shallow soft-bottomed areas. They participate in a daily vertical migration, traveling from deep water during the day to shallow waters at night. This behavior is not only very important to their predators; the walleye, the northern pike, and the lake trout, but also in transporting nutrients in thermally stratified lakes. The nocturnal migration allows for foraging under the cover of night. The trout-perch feeds on a variety of small invertebrates including insect larvae and crustaceans. Juveniles feed on zooplankton. Larger adults will eat small fish such as the johnny darter.

== Breeding ==
The trout-perch becomes sexually mature at 1–3 years of age. The spawning season is May through August. Spawning sites consist of sandbars and rocks in lakes or on gravel or sand in tributary streams. Three to four males will surround a single female and release their sperm as the female is releasing her eggs. The eggs will be fertilized and sink to the bottom of the lake. A single female can lay 200–700 eggs, which receive no parental care. The eggs will hatch in six days when the water temperature is 20–23 °C (68–73 °F). The life span of the trout-perch is around 4 years.

== Ecological role ==
Although the trout-perch are abundant fish, their ecological role have not been well studied and are still not well understood, yet it is believed the trout-perch plays an important role at maintaining the equilibrium of its habitat. A study was conducted in Saginaw Bay, Lake Huron to learn about the ecological role of the trout-perch. Some results were collected, but there is still more to learn about this species. An important finding referred to the energy content of the trout-perch, which was higher than other similar species. The energy content of the trout-perch was 4795 joules, whereas yellow perch and round goby energy content were lower; 4662 joules and 3740 joules respectively. These findings are the main reason, scientists believe the trout-perch is an important source of food for other species in their habitat. Another finding showed that trout-perch prefer to feed from Chironomidae larvae (lake flies larvae), but during some months and trout-perch sizes, there was a slight difference in the feeding source. Bigger fish of this species preferred to feed on Amphipoda, whereas smaller fish feed on Zooplankton. Lake flies, lake flies larvae, and Amphipoda, seem to be the most important diet items for trout-perch in Saginaw Bay. The diet seemed to be the same for trout- perch in other systems besides Saginaw Bay, Lake Huron. Therefore, Trout-perch showed to be numerically important for the area since it seem to help to maintain the proper amount of species in its environment by serving as a food source and by preying on species, which are increasing and their increased can affect the ecosystem equilibrium.

== Parasites ==
Trout-perch fish have been found infected by a variant of Myxobolus, known as Myxobolus intramusculi, a protist that acts as a muscular parasite. A study found that this strain of protist produces smaller (13–14.5 micrometres long vs 15–17 micrometres long), yet identically-shaped (narrow pyriform) spores than the original strain of protozoa and affects primarily within red and white muscle fibers and only rarely among the subdermal connective tissue in the trout-perch. The parasite grows until it replaces the entire content of the trout-perch cell and appears its developments stops abruptly before rupturing the outer cell membrane of the host cell which means it does not damage the cell significantly and does not have a lethal effect on the host. All the infected trout-perch seemed to have normal health and not any muscle deterioration. The only obvious effect of the parasite was a localized cyst on the area with infected cells. The parasites do not have lethal effects on trout-perch and these parasites cannot be transmitted from fish to humans.
