= Patricia Kambesis =

American caver, cartographer and educator

Patricia Kambesis (born November 7, 1952) is an American caver, cartographer and educator.

Kambesis is a professor at Western Kentucky University, instructing students the fields of geography and geographic information systems (GIS). Kambesis coauthored the book Deep Secrets: The Discovers & Exploration of Lechuguilla Cave, which was first published in 1999. She has also authored, coauthored or otherwise contributed to numerous papers and articles on karst related subjects. Her work has been published by the National Speleological Society, Cave Research Foundation, Woodrow Wilson International Center for Scholars, International Union of Speleology, and Geological Society of America, among others.

Kambesis is a fellow of the National Speleological Society and Cave Research Foundation.

== Biography ==
Growing up in Chicago, Illinois, Kambesis attained a Bachelor's of Science in biology from the University of Illinois followed by a Bachelor's of Science in geology from Southern Illinois University. She would go on to earn a Masters of Science from Western Kentucky University and a Doctorate from Mississippi State University.

In 1974, Kambesis first became involved in the exploration and mapping of caves. Since then, she has received a number of honors from the National Speleological Society's Cartographic Salon, a competition held at the society's annual convention dedicated to highlighting achievements in cave cartography. As of 2020, these honors include two Best of Salon Medals, eight Blue Ribbon Merit Awards and fifteen Green Ribbon Honorable Mentions. Starting in 1995, Kambesis often served as a judge for the Cartographic Salon. In 2017, Kambesis attended the International Congress of Speleology in Australia along with other staff and students from Western Kentucky University. At the event's Cartographic Salon, Kambesis received a First Place prize & Best of Show award for her map of Barrel Cave in Jackson County, Alabama.

Kambesis has been active in both national and international caving circles. She was one of the first people to enter the "Chandelier Ballroom" in Lechuguilla Cave, New Mexico. Her involvement in the exploration and mapping of Lechuguilla were subsequently recorded along with the recollections of other cavers in the book Deep Secrets: The Discovers & Exploration of Lechuguilla Cave. When a sinkhole opened up beneath the National Corvette Museum in 2014, resulting in damage to eight cars, Kambesis was one of the cavers involved in exploring and mapping the sinkhole. Kambesis has also been involved in exploration and surveying of caves in and around Mammoth Cave National Park through work with the Cave Research Foundation.

Outside of the mainland United States, Kambesis has worked on cave projects in China, Greece, Nigeria, Laos, Mexico, Haiti, Cuba, Puerto Rico and beyond. She has served as a Committee Chair of the National Speleological Society's International Exploration Committee and is the Cave Research Foundation's International Projects Chairperson. Additionally, Kambesis has held the position of chief cartographer for the China Caves Project, a collaborative program jointly run by the Cave Research Foundation, Hoffman Environmental Research Institute, Karst Institute of China, and Guizhou Normal University.

== Awards and honors ==
- Exploration Award, Cave Diving Section - National Speleological Society (2015)
- PhD. Research Fellowship - Cave Research Foundation (2011)
- National Speleological Society Research Award (2004)
- Master of Science Research Fellowship – Cave Research Foundation (2003)
- Cave Research Foundation Fellowship (1993)
- Lew Bicking Award for Cave Exploration, National Speleological Society (1993)
- Bureau of Land Management Volunteer Recognition (1989)
- National Speleological Society Fellowship (1985)

=== Cave Cartography Awards ===
- International Congress of Speleology Cartography Salon - First Place & Best of Show
  - Barrel Cave, Jackson County, Alabama (2017)
- National Speleological Society Cartographic Salon - Best of Salon Medal
  - Wu Dong, Duyin County, China (1994)
  - Snowflower Pit, Alabama (1990)
- National Speleological Society Cartographic Salon - Blue Ribbon Merit Award
  - Hickey Pot, Warren County, Tennessee (2013)
  - Wayback Cave, White County, Tennessee (2009)
  - Bull Cave System, Blount County, Tennessee (2001)
  - Wayback Cave, White County, Tennessee (1997)
  - Hickey Pot, Tennessee (1997)
  - Shoung Long Dong, China (1993)
  - Chui Feng Dong, Guizhou Province, China (1992)
  - Caves and Karst of the Zhijin River Gorge, Guizhou Province, China (1992)

== Published works ==
=== Books ===
- Reames, Stephen; Fish, Lawrence; Burger, Paul; Kambesis, Patricia; et al. (1999). Deep Secrets : The Discovery & Exploration of Lechuguilla Cave. St. Louis, MO: Cave Books. ISBN 0-939748-18-5. OCLC 40881629.

=== Selected articles and papers ===
- Caves and Karst of the Judas-Aguada Coastal Plain, Caguanes National Park, Sancti Spiritus, Cuba (2018)
- Exploring the Mechanisms and Consequences of Cave Roof Collapses Using the National Corvette Museum Sinkhole Case Study (2017)
- The Making of a Connection: Exploration/Survey in Whigpistle Cave System (2013)
- Lechuguilla Cave, New Mexico, U.S.A. (2012)
- Tham Khoun Xe - The Great Cave on the Xe Bang Fai River (2009)
- The Importance of Cave Exploration to Scientific Research (2007)
