= Margaretta Brucker =

American novelist (1883–1958)

Margaretta Lena Brucker (1883–1958) was an American fiction author active from approximately 1937 until 1958.

== Career ==
Brucker wrote juvenile fiction, mysteries, and serial stories for newspapers. She also published a number of romance novels using the pseudonym Margaret Howe. Her first book was published in 1936 and 25 books were published in total.

== Personal life ==
Brucker was born in Saginaw, Michigan and spent her early life in Shelby, Ohio. She graduated from Lake Erie College at Painesville. She taught home economics in private schools in Alabama and Mississippi before turning to writing in 1936. She also owned the Cotton Bale Tea Room in Harbor Springs, Michigan which she operated for almost 40 years beginning in 1920.

Her nephew, Roger Brucker, credits her with inspiring him to become a writer.
