= Richard Watson (philosopher) =

American philosopher, speleologist, and author (1931–2019)

Richard A. Watson
- Born: February 23, 1931
- Died: September 18, 2019 (aged 88)
- Employer: Washington University in St. Louis
- Spouse: Patty Jo Watson

Philosophical work
- Era: Contemporary philosophy
- Region: Western philosophy
- Main interests: History of philosophy

Richard Allan Watson (February 23, 1931 – September 18, 2019) was an American philosopher, speleologist and author.

== Biography ==
Watson taught philosophy at Washington University in St. Louis for forty years and was the spouse of Patty Jo Watson, also a professor at Washington University. He was considered one of the foremost authorities on Descartes. He was an Emeritus Professor of Philosophy for Washington University.

Watson earned a degree in geology specializing in "paleoclimatology of 10,000 years ago." This involved the development of agrarian societies in the Fertile Crescent. From July 1965 to July 1967, he was president of the Cave Research Foundation.

His book, Cogito, Ergo Sum: a life of René Descartes is a travelogue in the form of following Descartes's travels around Europe. It was chosen by the New York Public Library as one of its "25 Books to Remember from 2002."

== Criticism of animal rights ==
Watson authored the article Self-consciousness and the Rights of Nonhuman Animals and Nature, which argued that most animals do not have rights such as the rights for freedom or from unnecessary suffering because they are not moral agents, do not possess self-consciousness, free will, or have the capability for understanding moral principles or the physical capability to act according to given principles of duty. According to Watson, an animal deserving of rights must have a well developed brain to discern "right from wrong".

== Selected publications ==
Richard A. Watson's publications include the following books and articles:

- Cogito, Ergo Sum: a life of Rene Descartes. David R Godine. 2007 [2002]. ISBN 978-1-56792-335-3. Was chosen by the New York Public library as one of "25 Books to Remember from 2002"
- The Philosopher's Demise: Learning French. David R Godine. 2003. ISBN 978-1-56792-227-1.Has been translated into Italian
- The Philosopher's Diet: how to lose weight and change the world. David R Godine. 1999. ISBN 978-1-56792-084-0.Has been translated into nine languages.
- Niagara. Coffee House Press. 2000. ISBN 978-1-56689-006-9.. The biography of the first person to cross the Falls on a wire, and the first person(a woman) to go over the Falls in a barrel. The French translation has featured at the Saint-Malo Ettonants voyageurs Festival International du Lirre in 1997, where it won a translation award.
- Descartes's Ballet: His Doctrine Of Will & Political Philosophy. St. Augustines Press. 2004. ISBN 978-1-58731-175-8.
- In the Dark Cave. Star Bright Books. 2005. ISBN 978-1-59572-038-2.
- Watson, Richard A. The Downfall of Cartesianism. The Hague: Martinus Nijhoff, 1966.
  - Watson, R.A. The breakdown of Cartesian metaphysics. - Atlantic Highlands (N.J.) : Humanities press intern., 1987. - XII, 240 p. Bibliogr.: p. 223-235. Name ind.: p. 237-240.
  - RICHARD A. WATSON. The Breakdown of Cartesian Metaphysics. Hackett Publishing Company, 1998. ISBN 9780872204065
- Representational Ideas from Plato to Patricia Churchland (Kluwer Academic Publishers)
- Under Plowman's Floor
- The Runner
- The Longest Cave (with Roger W. Brucker) (hb Alfred A. Knopf, pb Southern Illinois University Press)
- The high road to Pyrrhonism / Ed. by Watson R.A., Force J.E. - San Diego: Hill, 1980. - XIV, 385 p. - (Studies in Hume a. Scott. philosophy; 2) Indices.: p. 369-385.

=== Articles ===
- Watson is the author of the Encyclopædia Britannica article on Descartes.
- "Berkeley in a Cartesian Context". // Revue Internationale de Philosophie 65 (1963), 381–94.
- "Berkeley in the Cartesian Tradition." Papers of the Michigan Academy of Science, Arts and Letters 48 (1963):587-97.
- "The Breakdown of Cartesian Metaphysics." Journal of the History of Philosophy 1 (1963):177-97.
- "Self-Consciousness and the Rights of Nonhuman Animals and Nature". Environmental Ethics (1979) Vol. 1, N 2. pp. 99-129.
- "What moves the mind: An excursion in Cartesian dualism". Amer. philos. quart. - Oxford, 1982. - vol. 19, N 1. - p. 73-81.
- "Shadow History". Journal of the History of Philosophy (1993) Vol. 31, N 1. - pp. 95-109.
- "Having ideas". Amer. philos. quart. - Oxford, 1994. - Vol. 31, N 3. - P. 185–198.
- "Malebranche and Arnauld on ideas" // Mod. schoolman. - Saint Louis, 1994. - Vol. 71, N 4. - P. 259–270.

== Notes ==
- Daues, Jessica (April 2, 2008). "Campus Author: Richard A. Watson". Washington University in St. Louis.
