= Cave Research Foundation =

American non-profit organization

The Cave Research Foundation (CRF) is an American private, non-profit group dedicated to the exploration, research, and conservation of caves. The group arose in the early 1950s from the exploration efforts at Floyd Collins Crystal Cave, now within Mammoth Cave National Park. Its stated goals were: to promote exploration and documentation of caves and karst areas, initiate and support cave and karst research, aid in cave conservation and protection, and to assist with the interpretation of caves and karst to the public.

== Growth ==
CRF officially incorporated in 1957 under the laws of the Commonwealth of Kentucky.

The Guadalupe Cave Survey, explorers at Carlsbad Caverns National Park, New Mexico, became part of CRF in 1971. In 1976, cave survey at Sequoia National Park/Kings Canyon National Park, California, and Buffalo National River, Arkansas, became CRF projects. Additional cave projects in Cumberland Gap National Historic Park, Kentucky; Lava Beds National Monument, California; and the Ozark National Scenic Riverways, Missouri; have been included as operation areas of the CRF.

== Focus ==
Starting with Mammoth Cave National Park, CRF work has primarily focused on United States federal lands---particularly within United States National Parks. As such, the CRF has been involved with several of the major cave exploration achievements of the 20th century. In particular, CRF mapping at Mammoth Cave, Kentucky led to its documentation as the world's longest known cave.

Since its inception, CRF has primarily been concerned with cave mapping. Thus, its membership draws experienced cavers, particularly those interested in cave surveying and cartography.

== Cave Books ==
Cave Books, founded in 1981, is the non-profit publishing affiliate of the Cave Research Foundation. It is perhaps the world's largest publisher of books on caves, karst, and speleology. Cave Books is staffed by volunteers, and the managing editor is Elizabeth Grace Winkler.

== Notable CRF cartographers and authors ==
- Patty Jo Watson, Ph.D., archaeologist
- Richard "Red" Watson, Ph.D., author of books on caves and philosophy
- Roger Brucker, explorer and author
- Patricia Crowther, explorer and computer programmer
- Will Crowther, explorer and computer programmer
