= Mammoth Cave National Park =

National park in Kentucky, United States

- IUCN category II (national park)
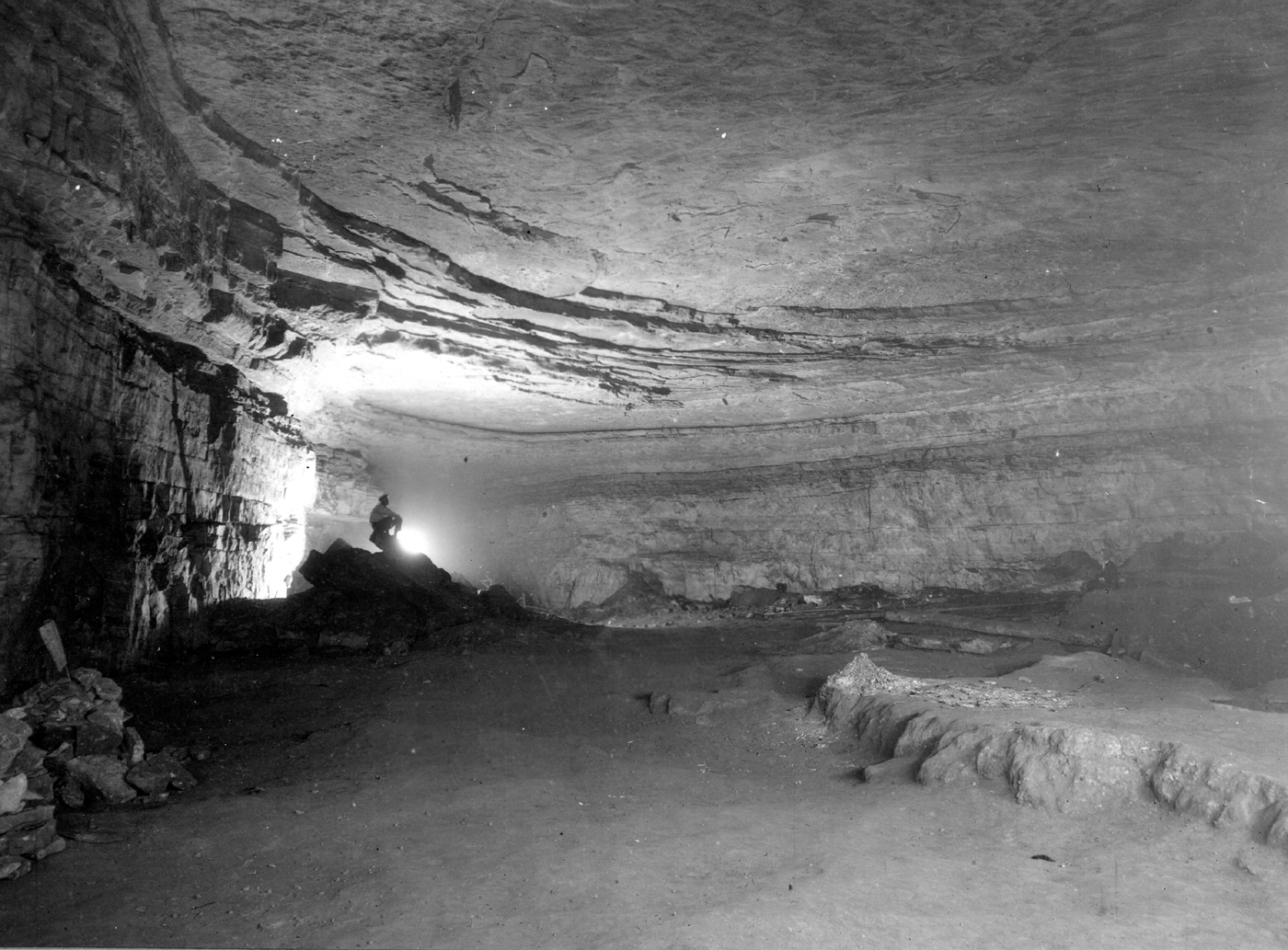
- The Rotunda Room at Mammoth Cave

- Location within Kentucky Location within the United States
- Interactive map of Mammoth Cave National Park
- Location: Edmonson, Hart, and Barren counties, Kentucky, U.S.
- Nearest city: Brownsville, Park City, and Cave City
- Coordinates: 37°11′13″N 86°06′04″W
- Area: 52,007 acres (210.46 km^{2})
- Established: July 1, 1941; 85 years ago
- Visitors: 747,042 (in 2024)
- Governing body: National Park Service
- Website: Mammoth Cave National Park

UNESCO World Heritage Site
- Criteria: Natural: vii, viii, x
- Reference: 150
- Inscription: 1981 (5th Session)

Mammoth Cave National Park is a national park of the United States in south-central Kentucky. It encompasses portions of Mammoth Cave, the longest known cave system in the world. The park's 52,007 acres (21,046 ha) are located primarily in Edmonson County, with small areas extending eastward into Hart and Barren counties. The Green River runs through the park, with a tributary called the Nolin River feeding into the Green just inside the park.

The cave system has formally been known as the Mammoth–Flint Ridge Cave System since 1972, when a connection was discovered between Mammoth Cave and the even longer system under Flint Ridge to the north. As of 2025, more than 426 miles (686 km) of passageways had been surveyed, over 1.5 times longer than the second-longest cave system, Mexico's Ox bel ha underwater cave.

The park was established as a national park on July 1, 1941, after oft-contentious eminent domain proceedings whose consequences still affect the region. It was named a World Heritage Site on October 27, 1981; an international Biosphere Reserve on September 26, 1990; and an International Dark Sky Park on October 28, 2021.

== Mission ==
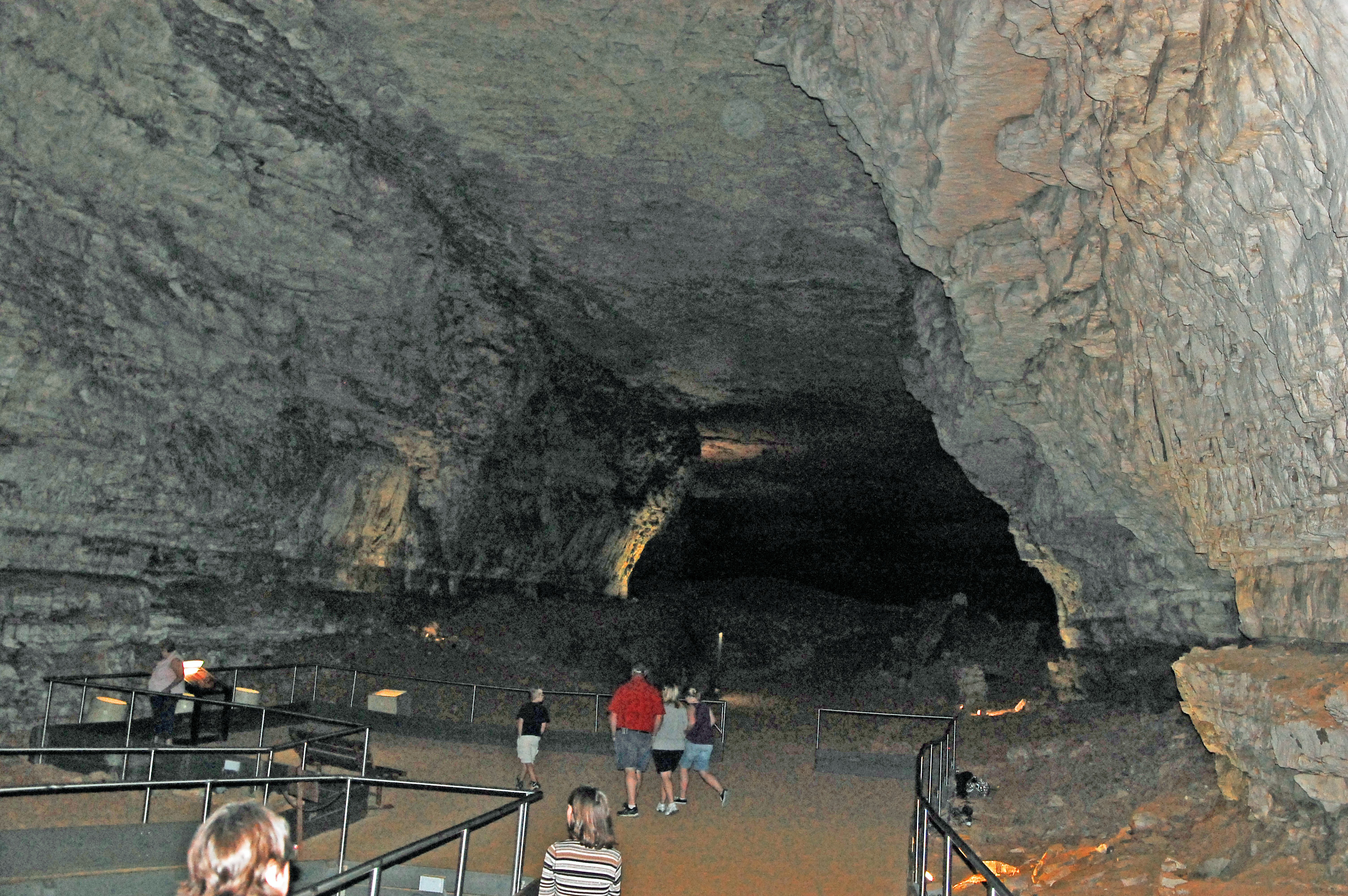
Tourists inside the cave

The park's mission is stated in its foundation document:

The purpose of Mammoth Cave National Park is to preserve, protect, interpret, and study the internationally recognized biological and geologic features and processes associated with the longest known cave system in the world, the park’s diverse forested karst landscape, the Green and Nolin rivers, and extensive evidence of human history; and to provide and promote public enjoyment, recreation, and understanding.

== Geology ==
A USGS bench mark disk embedded in bedrock at 37°10'45.3"N 86°06'32.0"W, Mammoth Cave National Park, Kentucky; the blank elevation field and "Write the Director, Washington D.C." inscription indicate a late 19th or early 20th century marker, predating standardized pre-stamped survey disks

Mammoth Cave developed approximately 330 million years ago in thick Mississippian-aged limestone strata – along with some dolomite, siltstone and shale – capped by a layer of sandstone, which has made the system remarkably stable. The various sedimentary rock found in the location are generally found in marine areas, which along with fossil evidence showed that Kentucky was once part of an ancient sea. Overall, the cave system is known to include more than 426 miles (686 km) of passageway. New discoveries and connections add several miles/kilometers to this figure each year.

The upper sandstone member is known as the Big Clifty Sandstone. Thin, sparse layers of limestone interspersed within the sandstone give rise to an epikarstic zone, in which tiny conduits (cave passages too small to enter) are dissolved by the natural acidity of groundwater. The epikarstic zone concentrates local flows of runoff into high-elevation springs which emerge at the edges of ridges. The resurgent water from these springs typically flows briefly on the surface before sinking underground again at the elevation of contact between the sandstone caprock and the underlying massive limestones. It is in these underlying massive limestone layers that the human-explorable caves of the region have naturally developed.

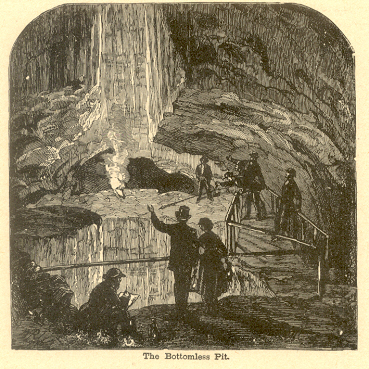
The Bottomless Pit in Mammoth Cave, woodcut (1887)

The limestone layers of the stratigraphic column beneath the Big Clifty, in increasing order of depth below the ridge-tops, are the Girkin Formation, the Ste. Genevieve Limestone, and the St. Louis Limestone. Water started to reach the Girkin stone about 10 million years ago while the upper areas of the cave formed around 3.2 million years ago. The large Main Cave passage seen on the Historic Tour is located at the bottom of the Girkin and the top of the Ste. Genevieve Formation.

Each of the primary layers of limestone is divided further into named geological units and sub-units. One area of cave research involves correlating the stratigraphy with the cave survey produced by explorers. This makes it possible to produce approximate three-dimensional maps of the contours of the various layer boundaries without the necessity for test wells and extracting core samples.

The upper sandstone caprock is relatively hard for water to penetrate: the exceptions are where vertical cracks occur. This protective layer means that many of the older, upper passages of the cave system are very dry, with no stalactites, stalagmites, or other formations which require flowing or dripping water to develop.

However, the sandstone caprock layer has been dissolved and eroded at many locations within the park, such as the Frozen Niagara room. The contact between limestone and sandstone can be found by hiking from the valley bottoms to the ridgetops: typically, as one approaches the top of a ridge, one sees the outcrops of exposed rock change in composition from limestone to sandstone at a well-defined elevation.

At one valley bottom in the southern region of the park, a massive sinkhole has developed. Known as Cedar Sink, the sinkhole features a small river entering one side and disappearing back underground at the other side.

== Visiting ==
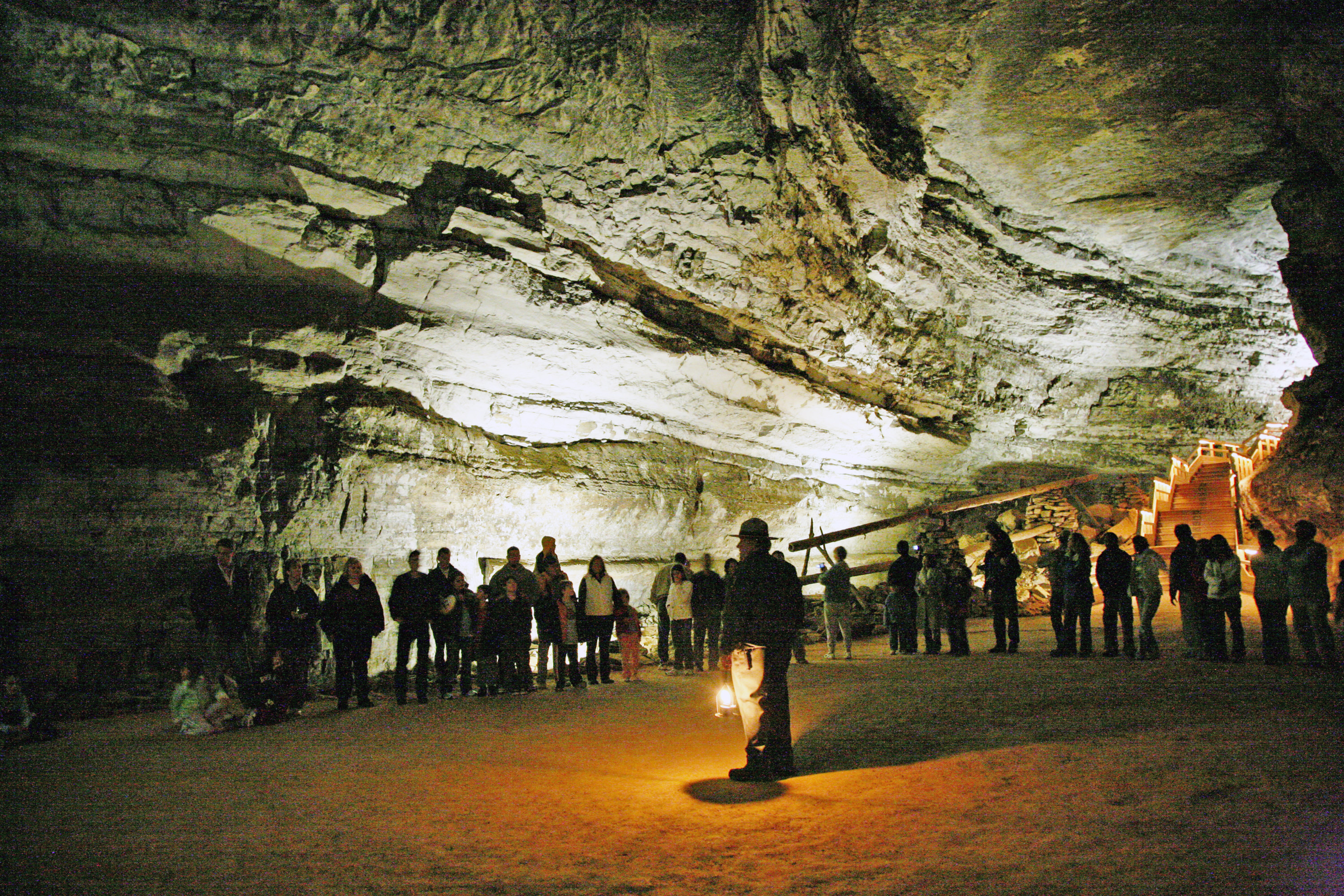
A ranger-guided tour of the cave

The National Park Service offers several cave tours to visitors. Some notable features of the cave, such as Grand Avenue, Frozen Niagara, and Fat Man's Misery, can be seen on lighted tours ranging from one to six hours in length. Two tours, lit only by visitor-carried kerosene lamps, are popular alternatives to the electric-lit routes. Several "wild" tours venture away from the developed parts of the cave into muddy crawls and dusty tunnels.

The Echo River Tour, one of the cave's most famous attractions, took visitors on a boat ride along an underground river. The tour was discontinued for logistical and environmental reasons in the early 1990s.

Mammoth Cave headquarters and visitor center is located on Mammoth Cave Parkway. The park can be accessed directly from I-65 at Exit 48. The parkway connects with Kentucky Route 70 from the north and Kentucky Route 255 from the south within the park.

== History ==
=== Prehistory ===
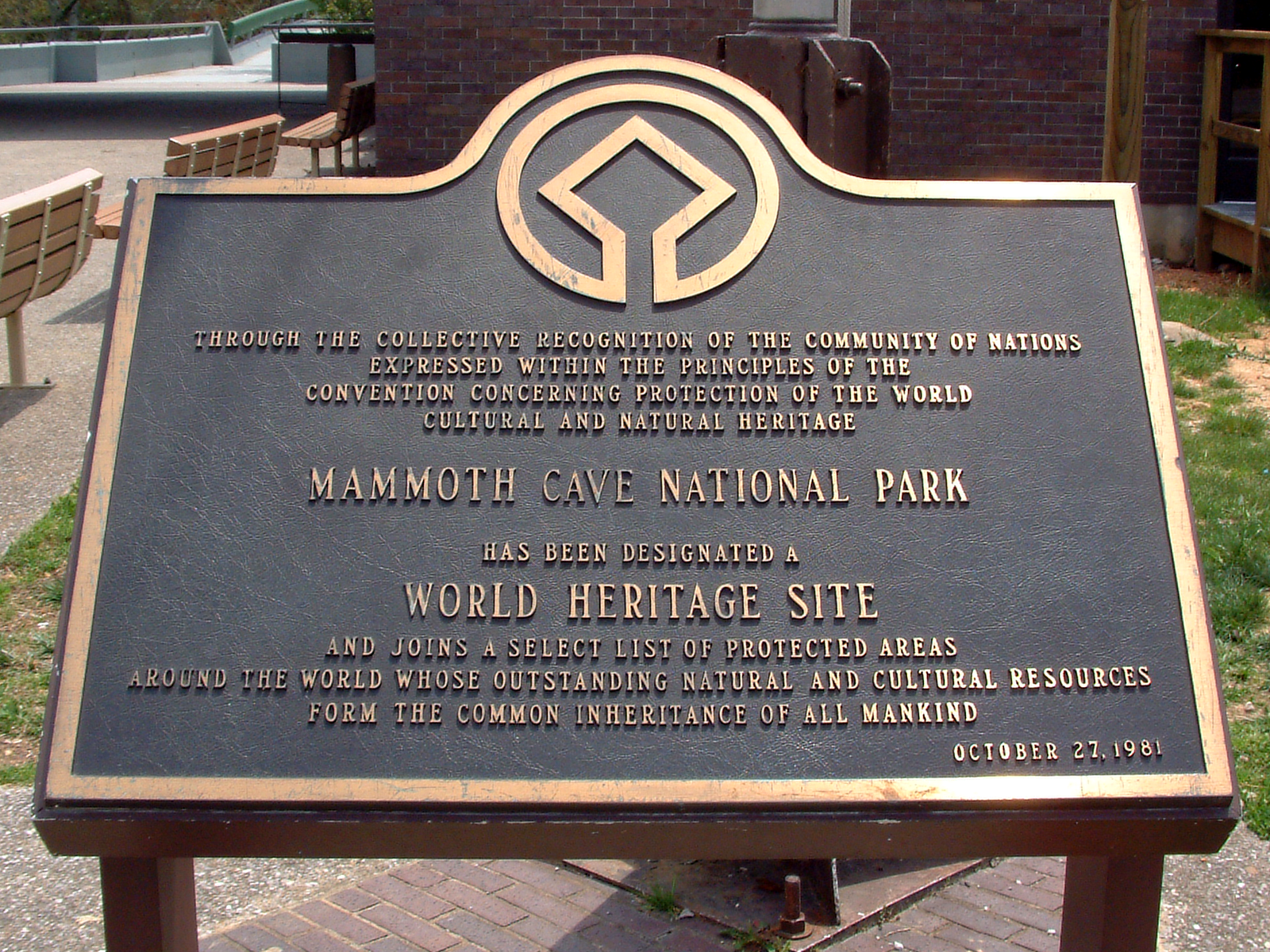
The World Heritage Site plaque

Human activity in Mammoth Cave traces back at least five thousand years. Several sets of Native American remains have been recovered from Mammoth Cave, or other nearby caves in the region, in both the 19th and 20th centuries. Most were mummies, representing examples of intentional burial, with ample evidence of pre-Columbian funerary practice.

An exception to purposeful burial was discovered when in 1935 the remains of an adult male were found under a large boulder. The boulder had shifted and settled onto the victim, a pre-Columbian miner, who had disturbed the rubble supporting it. The remains of the ancient victim were named "Lost John" and exhibited to the public into the 1970s, when they were interred in a secret location in Mammoth Cave for reasons of preservation as well as emerging political sensitivities with respect to the public display of Native American remains.

Research beginning in the late 1950s led by Patty Jo Watson, of Washington University in St. Louis has done much to illuminate the lives of the late Archaic and early Woodland peoples who explored and exploited caves in the region. Preserved by the constant cave environment, dietary evidence yielded carbon dates enabling Watson and others to determine the age of the specimens. An analysis of their content, also pioneered by Watson, allows determination of the relative content of plant and meat in the diet of either culture over a period spanning several thousand years. This analysis indicates a timed transition from a hunter-gatherer culture to plant domestication and agriculture.

Another technique employed in archaeological research at Mammoth Cave was experimental archaeology in which modern explorers were sent into the cave using the same technology as that employed by the ancient cultures whose leftover implements lie discarded in many parts of the cave. The goal was to gain insight into the problems faced by the ancient people who explored the cave, by placing the researchers in a similar physical situation.

Ancient human remains and artifacts within the caves are protected by various federal and state laws. One of the most basic facts to be determined about a newly discovered artifact is its precise location and situation. Even slightly moving a prehistoric artifact contaminates it from a research perspective. Explorers are properly trained not to disturb archaeological evidence, and some areas of the cave remain out-of-bounds for even seasoned explorers, unless the subject of the trip is archaeological research on that area.

Besides the remains that have been discovered in the portion of the cave accessible through the historic entrance of Mammoth Cave, the remains of cane torches used by Native Americans as well as other artifacts such as drawings, gourd fragments, and woven grass moccasin slippers are found in the Salts Cave section of the system in Flint Ridge.

=== Earliest written history ===
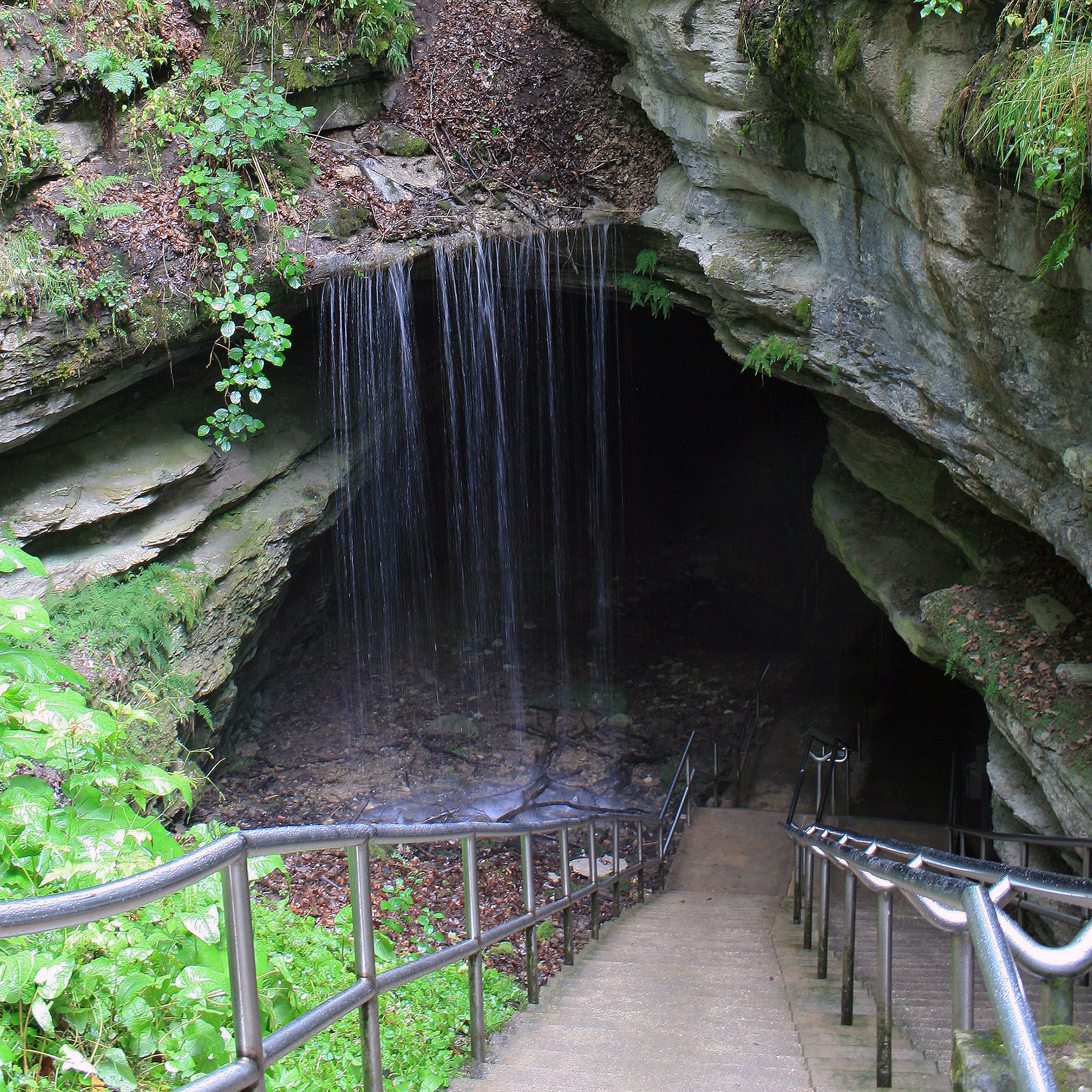
The historic entrance at 37°11′14″N 86°06′13″W

Legend has it that the first European to visit Mammoth Cave was either John Houchin or his brother Francis Houchin, in 1797. While hunting, Houchin pursued a wounded bear to the cave's large entrance opening near the Green River. Some Houchin Family tales have John Decatur "Johnny Dick" Houchin as the discoverer of the cave, but this is highly unlikely because Johnny Dick was only 10 years old in 1797 and was unlikely to be out hunting bears at such an age. His father John is the more likely candidate from that branch of the family tree, but the most probable candidate for discoverer of Mammoth Cave is Francis "Frank" Houchin, whose land was much closer to the cave entrance than his brother John's. There is also the argument that their brother Charles Houchin, who was known as a great hunter and trapper, was the man who shot that bear and chased it into the cave. The shadow over Charles's claim is the fact that he was residing in Illinois until 1801. Contrary to this story is Brucker and Watson's The Longest Cave, which asserts that the cave was "certainly known before that time". Caves in the area were known before the discovery of the entrance to Mammoth Cave. Even Francis Houchin had a cave entrance on his land very near the bend in the Green River known as the Turnhole, which is less than a mile from the main entrance of Mammoth Cave.

Saltpeter Mine Ruins in Mammoth Cave

The land containing this historic entrance was first surveyed and registered in 1798 under the name of Valentine Simon. Simon began exploiting Mammoth Cave for its saltpeter reserves.

=== 19th century ===
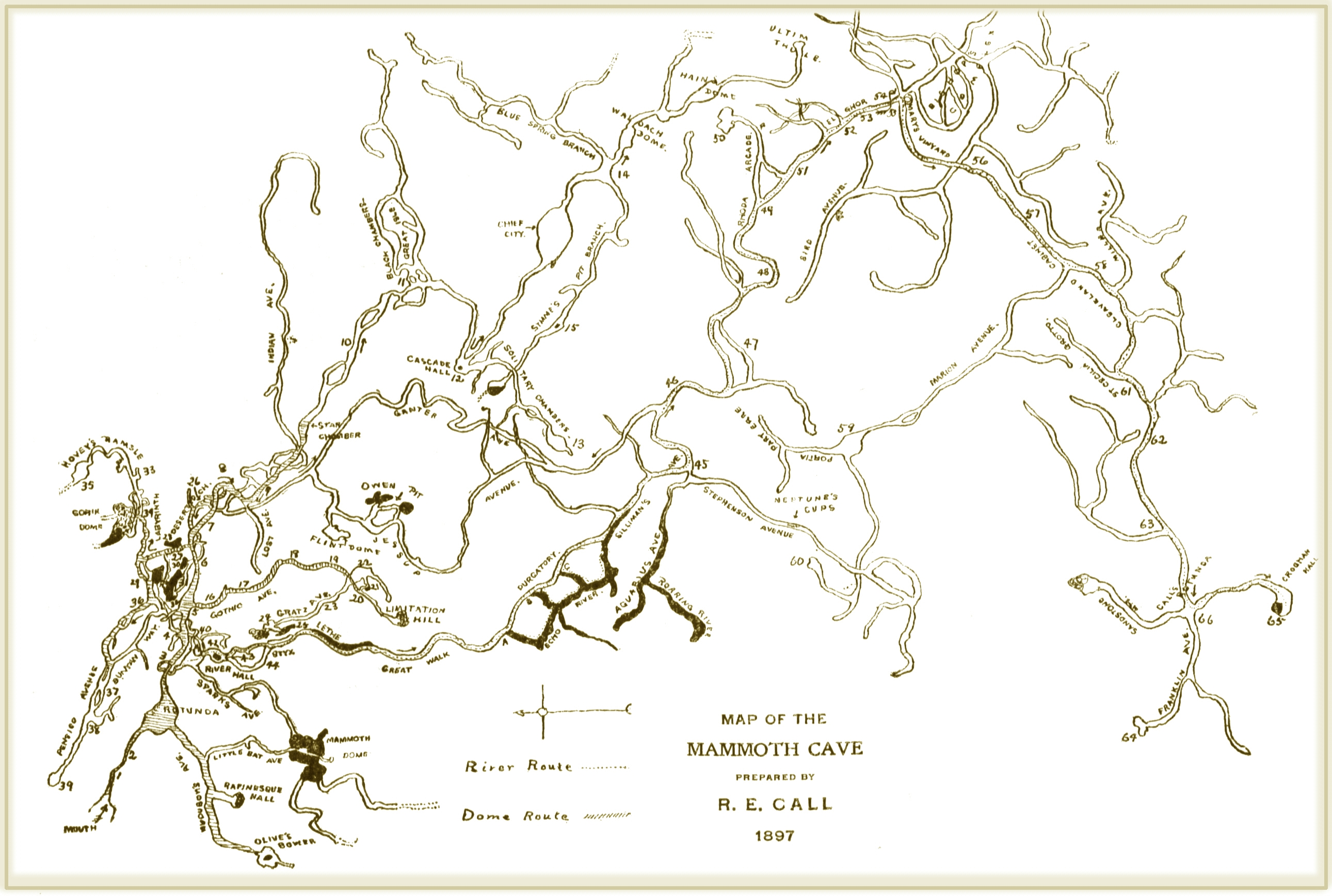
Map of Mammoth Cave (1897)

In partnership with Valentine Simon, various other individuals would own the land through the War of 1812, when Mammoth Cave's saltpeter reserves became significant due to the Jefferson Embargo Act of 1807 which prohibited all foreign trade. The blockade starved the American military of saltpeter and therefore gunpowder. As a result, the domestic price of saltpeter rose and production based on nitrates extracted from caves such as Mammoth Cave became more lucrative.

In July 1812, the cave was purchased from Simon and other owners by Charles Wilkins and an investor from Philadelphia named Hyman Gratz. Soon the cave was being mined for calcium nitrate on an industrial scale, utilizing a labor force of 70 slaves to build and operate the soil leaching apparatus, as well as to haul the raw soil from deep in the cave to the central processing site.

A half-interest in the cave changed hands for $10,000 (equivalent to over $150,000 in 2020). After the war when prices fell, the workings were abandoned and it became a minor tourist attraction centering on a Native American mummy discovered nearby.

When Wilkins died his estate's executors sold his interest in the cave to Gratz. In the spring of 1838, the cave was sold by the Gratz brothers to Franklin Gorin, who intended to operate Mammoth Cave purely as a tourist attraction, the bottom long having since fallen out of the saltpeter market. Gorin was a slave owner, and used his slaves as tour guides. Stephen Bishop was one of these slaves and would make a number of important contributions to human knowledge of the cave, becoming one of Mammoth Cave's most celebrated historical figures.

Stephen Bishop was an African-American slave and a guide to the cave during the 1840s and 1850s, was one of the first people to make extensive maps of the cave, and named many of the cave's features.

Stephen Bishop was introduced to Mammoth Cave in 1838 by Franklin Gorin. Gorin wrote, after Bishop's death: "I placed a guide in the cave – the celebrated and great Stephen, and he aided in making the discoveries. He was the first person who ever crossed the Bottomless Pit, and he, myself and another person whose name I have forgotten were the only persons ever at the bottom of Gorin's Dome to my knowledge."

"After Stephen crossed the Bottomless Pit, we discovered all that part of the cave now known beyond that point. Previous to those discoveries, all interest centered in what is known as the 'Old Cave' ... but now many of the points are but little known, although as Stephen was wont to say, they were 'grand, gloomy and peculiar'."

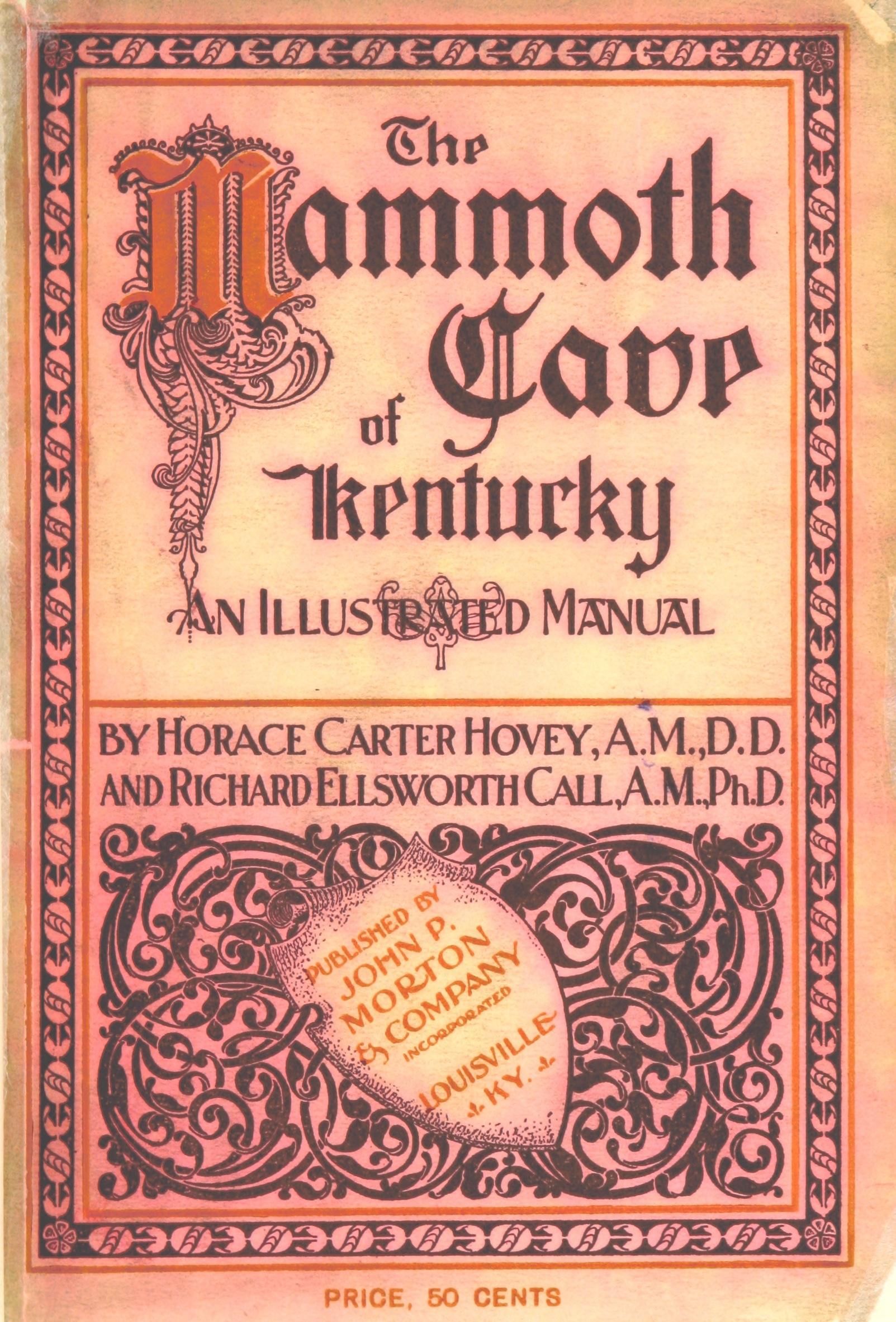
The Mammoth Cave of Kentucky: An illustrated manual (1897)

In 1839, John Croghan of Louisville bought the Mammoth Cave Estate, including Bishop and its other slaves from their previous owner, Franklin Gorin. Croghan briefly ran an ill-fated tuberculosis hospital in the cave in 1842–43, the vapors of which he believed would cure his patients. A widespread epidemic of the period, tuberculosis would ultimately claim the life of Dr. Croghan in 1849.

In 1866, the first photos from within the Mammoth Cave were taken by Charles Waldack, a photographer from Cincinnati, Ohio, using a very dangerous method of flash photography called magnesium flash photography.

Throughout the 19th century, the fame of Mammoth Cave would grow so that the cave became an international sensation. At the same time, the cave attracted the attention of 19th century writers such as Robert Montgomery Bird, the Rev. Robert Davidson, the Rev. Horace Martin, Alexander Clark Bullitt, Nathaniel Parker Willis (who visited in June 1852), Bayard Taylor (in May 1855), William Stump Forwood (in spring 1867), the naturalist John Muir (early September 1867), the Rev. Horace Carter Hovey, and others. As a result of the growing renown of Mammoth Cave, the cave boasted famous visitors such as actor Edwin Booth (his brother, John Wilkes Booth, assassinated Abraham Lincoln in 1865), singer Jenny Lind (who visited the cave on April 5, 1851), and violinist Ole Bull who together gave a concert in one of the caves. Two chambers in the caves have since been known as "Booth's Amphitheatre" and "Ole Bull's Concert Hall".

=== Early 20th century: The Kentucky Cave Wars ===
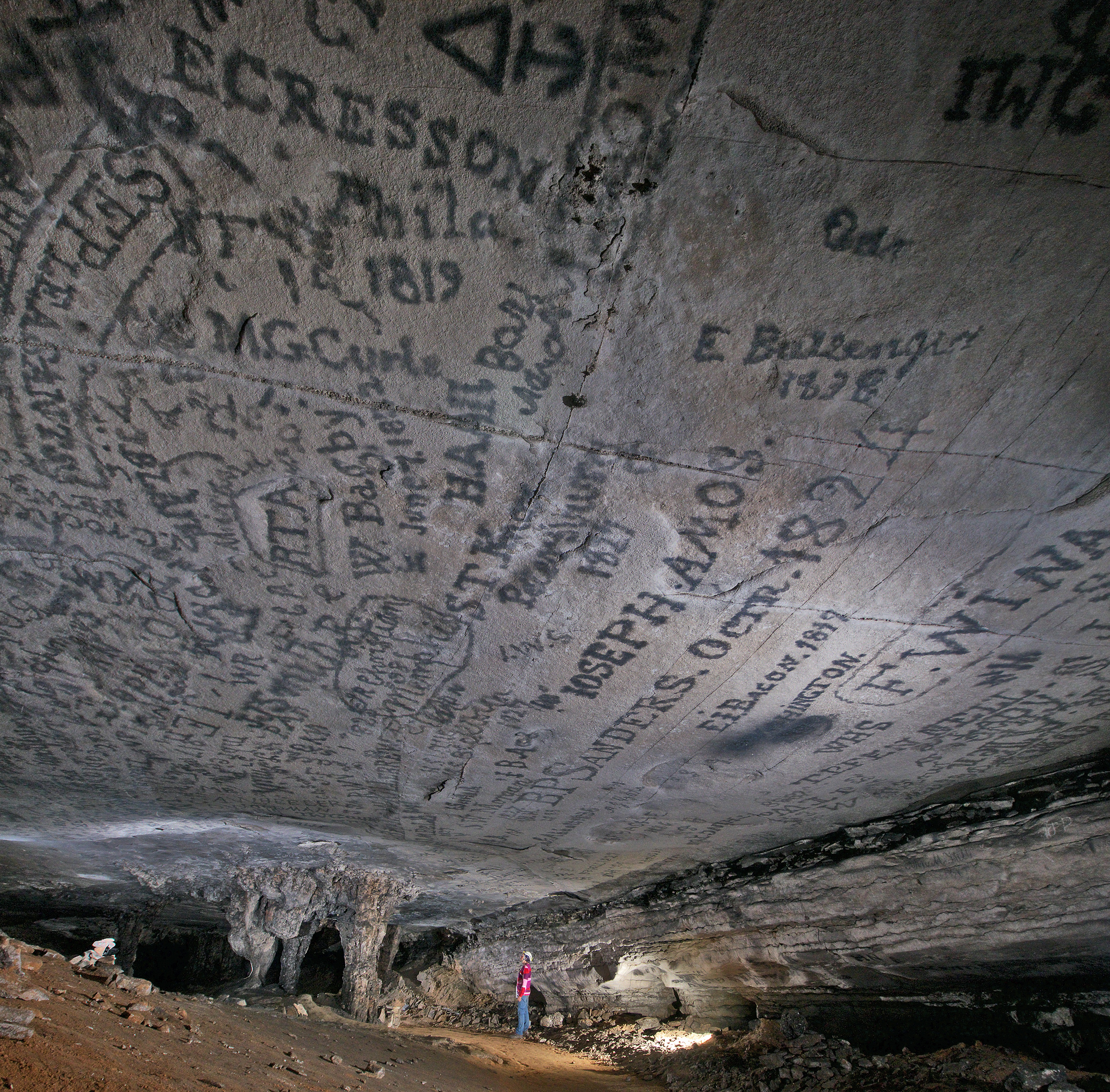
Historic signatures on the ceiling of Gothic Avenue

The difficulties of farming life in the hardscrabble, poor soil of the cave-country influenced local owners of smaller nearby caves to see opportunities for commercial exploitation, particularly given the success of Mammoth Cave as a tourist attraction. The "Kentucky Cave Wars" was a period of bitter competition between local cave owners for tourist money. Broad tactics of deception were used to lure visitors away from their intended destination to other private show caves. Misleading signs were placed along the roads leading to the Mammoth Cave. A typical strategy during the early days of automobile travel involved representatives (known as "cappers") of other private show caves hopping aboard a tourist's car's running board, and leading the passengers to believe that Mammoth Cave was closed, quarantined, caved in or otherwise inaccessible.

In 1906, Mammoth Cave became accessible by steamboat with the construction of a lock and dam at Brownsville, Kentucky.

In 1908, Max Kämper, a young German mining engineer, arrived at the cave by way of New York. Kämper had just graduated from technical college and his family had sent him on a trip abroad as a graduation present. Originally intending to spend two weeks at Mammoth Cave, Kämper spent several months. With the assistance of Ed Bishop, a Mammoth Cave Guide, Kämper produced a remarkably accurate instrumental survey of many kilometers of Mammoth Cave, including many new discoveries.

The Croghan family suppressed Kämper's map, although now the map stands as a triumph of accurate cave cartography: not until the early 1960s and the advent of the modern exploration period would these passages be surveyed and mapped with greater accuracy. Kämper meanwhile had returned to Berlin and would ultimately die in World War I.

In the early 1920s, George Morrison created, via blasting, a number of entrances to Mammoth Cave on land not owned by the Croghan Estate. Absent the data from the Croghan's secretive surveys, performed by Kämper, Bishop, and others, which had not been published in a form suitable for determining the geographic extent of the cave, it was now conclusively shown that the Croghans had been for years exhibiting portions of Mammoth Cave which were not under land they owned. Lawsuits were filed and, for a time, different entrances to the cave were operated in direct competition with each other.

In the early 20th century, Floyd Collins spent ten years exploring the Flint Ridge Cave System (the most important legacy of these explorations was his discovery of Floyd Collins' Crystal Cave and exploration in Salts Cave) before dying at Sand Cave, Kentucky, in 1925. While exploring Sand Cave, he dislodged a rock onto his leg while in a tight crawlway and was unable to be rescued before dying of starvation. Attempts to rescue Collins created a mass media sensation; the resulting publicity would draw prominent Kentuckians to initiate a movement which would result in the formation of Mammoth Cave National Park in 1941.

=== The national park movement (1926–1941) ===
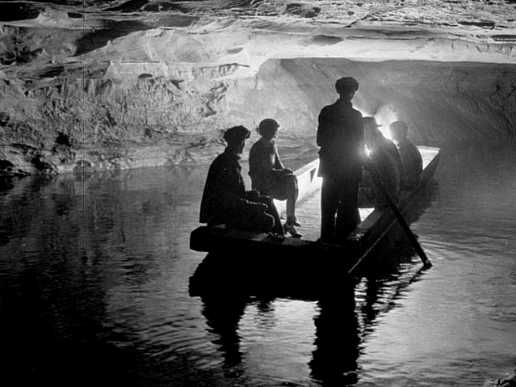
River Styx cave boat tour

As the last of the Croghan heirs died, advocacy grew among wealthy citizens of Kentucky for the establishment of Mammoth Cave National Park. Private citizens formed the Mammoth Cave National Park Association in 1924. The park was authorized May 25, 1926.

Donated funds were used to purchase some farmsteads in the region, while other tracts within the proposed national park boundary were acquired by right of eminent domain. Unlike national parks in the sparsely populated American West, thousands of people were forced to move to form Mammoth Cave National Park. Eminent domain proceedings were often bitter, with landowners paid what were considered to be inadequate sums. The displacement and resulting acrimony received little notice outside of the affected communities.

For legal reasons, the federal government was prohibited from restoring or developing the cleared farmsteads while the private Association held the land: this regulation was evaded by the operation of "a maximum of four" CCC camps from May 22, 1933 to July 1942.

According to the National Park Service, "By May 22, 1936, 27,402 acres (11,089 ha) of land had been acquired and accepted by the Secretary of the Interior. The area was declared a national park on July 1, 1941, when the minimum of 45,310 acres (18,340 ha) (over 600 parcels) had been assembled."

Superintendent Hoskins later wrote of a summer tanager named Pete who arrived at the guide house on or around every April 20, starting in 1938. The bird ate from food held in the hands of the guides, to the delight of visitors, and provided food to his less-tame mate.

=== Birth of the national park (1941) ===
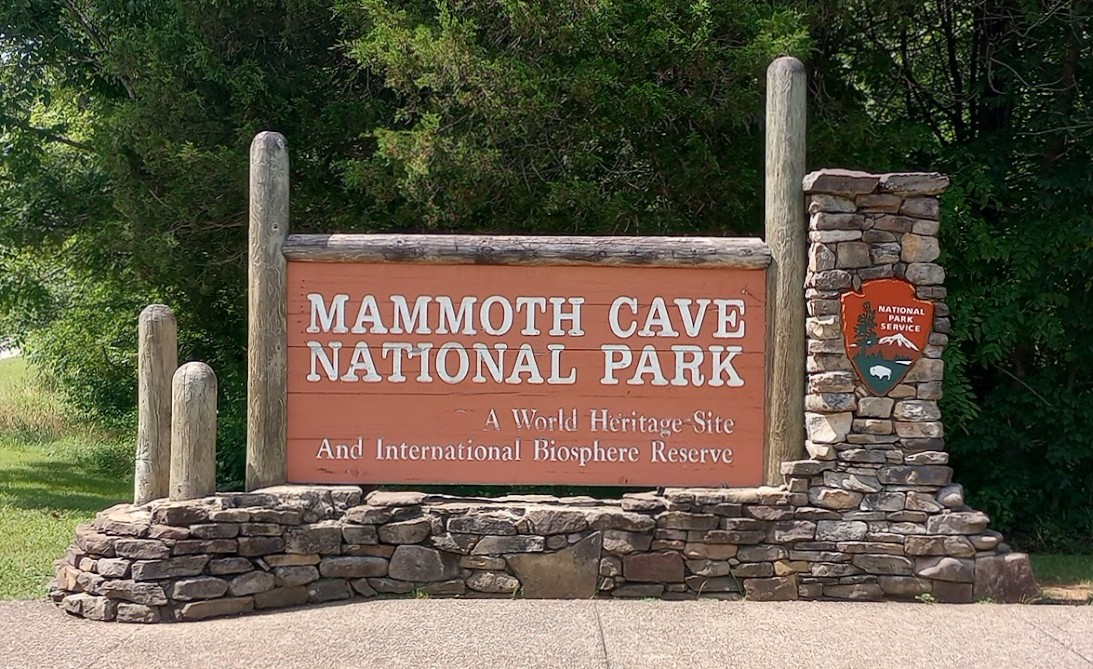
Mammoth Cave National Park sign

Mammoth Cave National Park was dedicated on July 1, 1941. The same year saw the incorporation of the National Speleological Society. R. Taylor Hoskins, the second Acting Superintendent under the old Association, became the first official Superintendent, a position he held until 1951.

The New Entrance, closed to visitors since 1941, was reopened on December 26, 1951, becoming the entrance used for the beginning of the Frozen Niagara tour.

=== The longest cave (1954–1972) ===
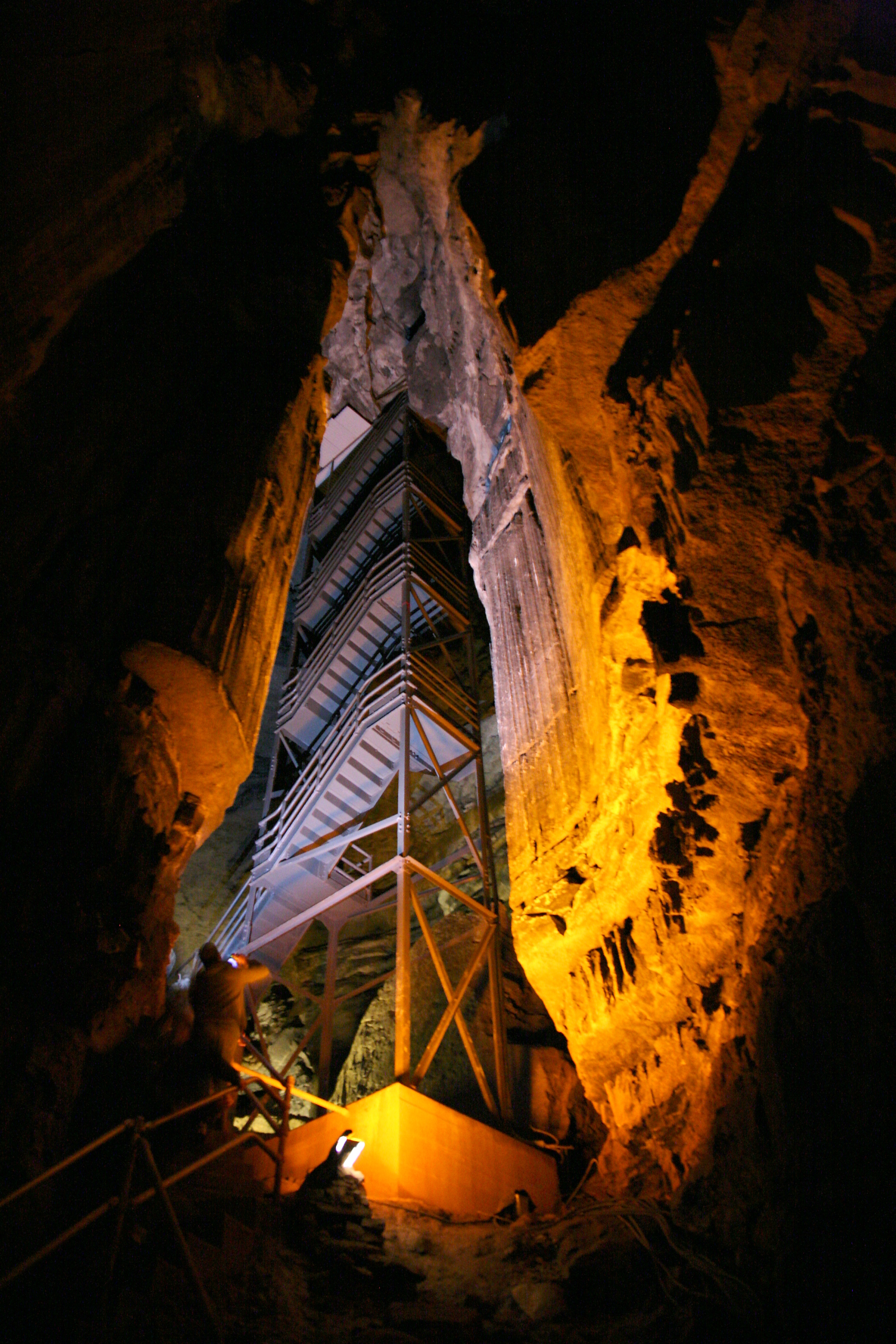
Staircase tower in Mammoth Dome

By 1954, Mammoth Cave National Park's land holdings encompassed all lands within its outer boundary with the exception of two privately held tracts. One of these, the old Lee Collins farm, had been sold to Harry Thomas of Horse Cave, Kentucky, whose grandson, William "Bill" Austin, operated Collins Crystal Cave as a show cave in direct competition with the national park, which was forced to maintain roads leading to the property.

In February 1954, a two-week expedition under the auspices of the National Speleological Society was organized at the invitation of Austin: this expedition became known as C-3, or the Collins Crystal Cave Expedition.

The C-3 expedition drew public interest, first from a photo essay published by Robert Halmi in the July 1954 issue of True Magazine and later from the publication of a double first-person account of the expedition, The Caves Beyond: The Story of the Collins Crystal Cave Expedition by Joe Lawrence Jr. (then president of the National Speleological Society) and Roger Brucker. The expedition proved conclusively that passages in Crystal Cave extended toward Mammoth Cave proper, at least exceeding the Crystal Cave property boundaries. However, this information was closely held by the explorers: it was feared that the National Park Service might forbid exploration were this known.

In 1955, Crystal Cave was connected by survey with Unknown Cave, the first connection in the Flint Ridge system.

Some of the participants in the C-3 expedition wished to continue their explorations past the conclusion of the C-3 Expedition, and organized as the Flint Ridge Reconnaissance under the guidance of Austin, Jim Dyer, John J. Lehrberger and E. Robert Pohl. This organization was incorporated in 1957 as the Cave Research Foundation. The organization sought to legitimize the cave explorers' activity through the support of original academic and scientific research. Notable scientists who studied Mammoth Cave during this period include Patty Jo Watson (see section on prehistory).

In March 1961, the Crystal Cave property was sold to the National Park Service for $285,000. At the same time, the Great Onyx Cave property, the only other remaining private inholding, was purchased for $365,000. The Cave Research Foundation was permitted to continue their exploration through a Memorandum of Understanding with the National Park Service.

Colossal Cave was connected by survey to Salts Cave in 1960 and in 1961 Colossal-Salts cave was similarly connected to Crystal-Unknown cave, creating a single cave system under much of Flint Ridge. By 1972, the Flint Ridge Cave System had been surveyed to a length of 86.5 miles (139.2 km), making it the longest cave in the world.

=== Flint–Mammoth connection (1972) ===
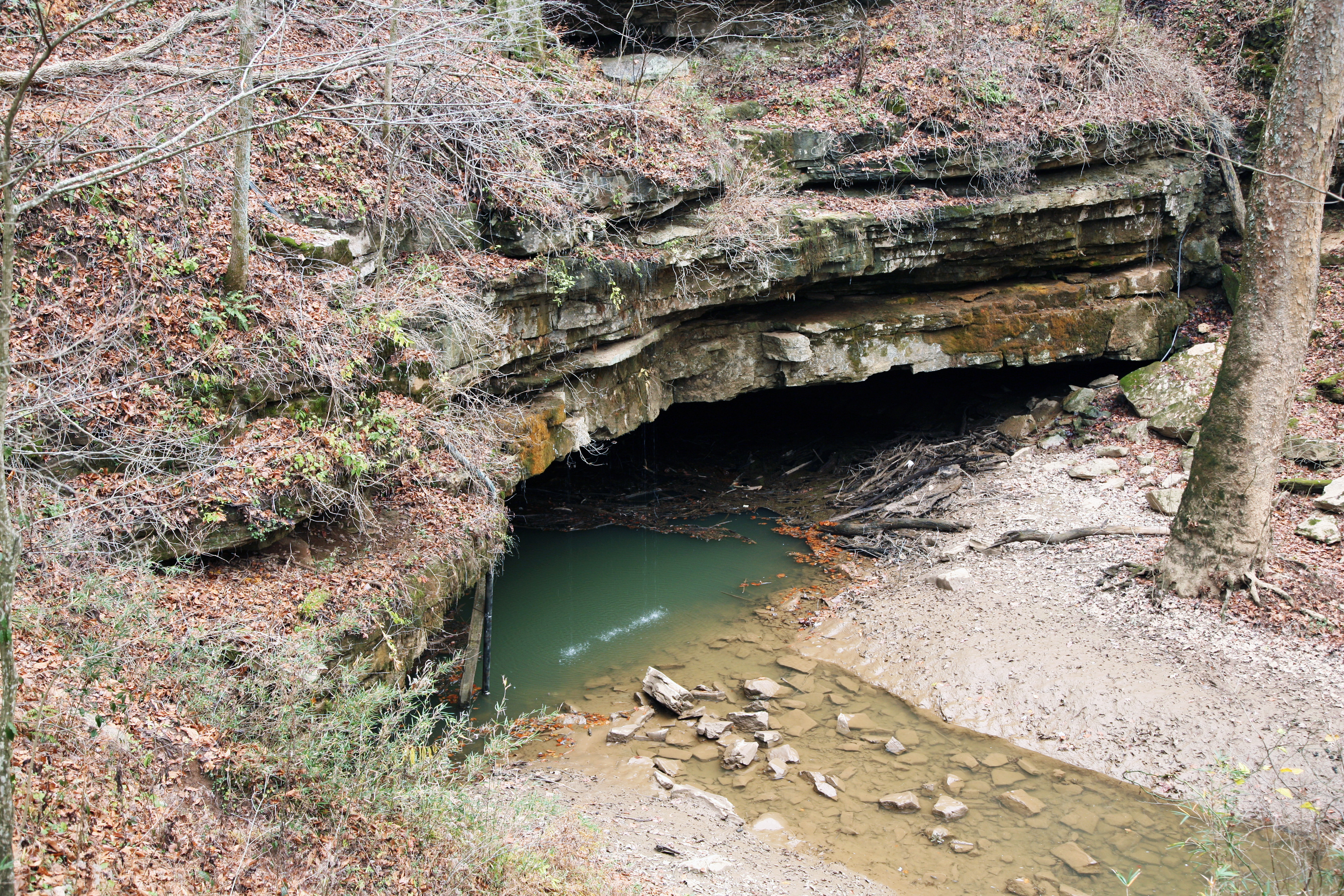
River Styx, one of the cave's semi-subterranean waterways, emerges onto the surface in the park.

During the 1960s, Cave Research Foundation (CRF) exploration and mapping teams had found passageways in the Flint Ridge Cave System that penetrated under Houchins Valley and came within 800 feet (240 m) of known passages in Mammoth Cave. In 1972, CRF Chief Cartographer John Wilcox pursued an aggressive program to finally connect the caves, fielding several expeditions from the Flint Ridge side as well as exploring leads in Mammoth Cave.

On a July 1972 trip, deep in the Flint Ridge Cave System, Patricia Crowther—with her slight frame of 115 pounds (52 kg) crawled through a narrow canyon later dubbed the "Tight Spot", which acted as a filter for larger cavers. A subsequent trip past the Tight Spot on August 30, 1972, by Wilcox, Crowther, Richard Zopf, and Tom Brucker discovered the name "Pete H" inscribed on the wall of a river passage with an arrow pointing in the direction of Mammoth Cave. The name is believed to have been carved by Warner P. "Pete" Hanson, who was active in exploring the cave in the 1930s. Hanson had been killed in World War II. The passage was named Hanson's Lost River by the explorers.

Finally, on September 9, 1972, a six-person CRF team of Wilcox, Crowther, Zopf, Gary Eller, Stephen Wells, and Cleveland Pinnix (a National Park Service ranger) followed Hanson's Lost River downstream to discover its connection with Echo River in Cascade Hall of Mammoth Cave. With this linking of the Flint Ridge and Mammoth Cave systems, the "Everest of speleology" had been climbed. The integrated cave system contained 144.4 miles (232.4 km) of surveyed passages and had fourteen entrances.

=== Recent discoveries ===
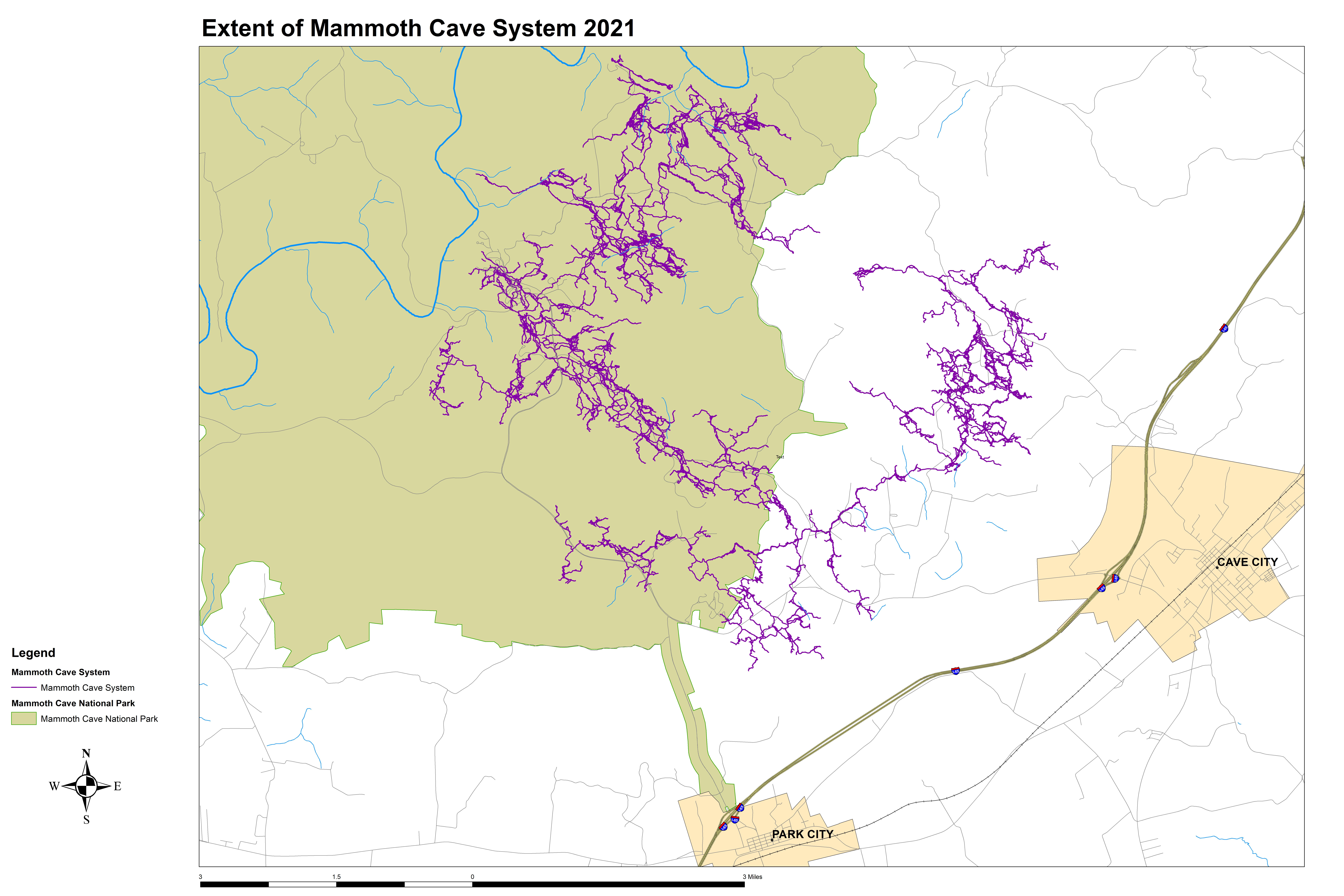
Mammoth cave system and surface

Further connections between Mammoth Cave and smaller caves or cave systems have followed, notably to Proctor/Morrison Cave beneath nearby Joppa Ridge in 1979. Proctor Cave was discovered by Jonathan Doyle, a Union Army deserter during the Civil War, and was later owned by the Mammoth Cave Railroad, before being explored by the CRF. Morrison cave was discovered by George Morrison in the 1920s. This connection pushed the frontier of Mammoth exploration southeastward.

At the same time, discoveries made outside the park by an independent group called the Central Kentucky Karst Coalition or CKKC resulted in the survey of tens of miles in Roppel Cave east of the park. Discovered in 1976, Roppel Cave was briefly on the list of the nation's longest caves before it was connected to the Proctor/Morrison's section of the Mammoth Cave System on September 10, 1983. The connection was made by two mixed parties of CRF and CKKC explorers. Each party entered through a separate entrance and met in the middle before continuing in the same direction to exit at the opposite entrance. The resulting total surveyed length was near 300 miles (480 km).

On March 19, 2005, a connection into the Roppel Cave portion of the system was surveyed from a small cave under Eudora Ridge, adding approximately three miles to the known length of the Mammoth Cave System. The newly found entrance to the cave, now termed the "Hoover Entrance", had been discovered in September 2003, by Alan Canon and James Wells. Incremental discoveries since then have pushed the total to more than 400 miles (640 km).

It is certain that many more miles of cave passages await discovery in the region. Discovery of new natural entrances is a rare event: the primary mode of discovery involves the pursuit of side passages identified during routine systematic exploration of cave passages entered from known entrances.

==== Related and nearby caves ====
At least two other massive cave systems lie short distances from Mammoth Cave: the Fisher Ridge Cave System and the Whigpistle Cave System. The Fisher Ridge Cave System was discovered in January 1981 by a group of Michigan cavers associated with the Detroit Urban Grotto of the National Speleological Society. So far, the Fisher Ridge Cave System has been mapped to 131 miles (211 km). In 1976, Rick Schwartz discovered a large cave south of the Mammoth Cave park boundary. This cave became known as the Whigpistle Cave System, as new exploration connected the 3 nearby caves of Whigpistle Cave (Schwartz's original entrance), Martin Ridge Cave, and Jackpot Cave. As of 2025, the Whigpistle Cave System has been mapped to a length of 42 miles (68 km), and exploration continues.

Located 7 miles (11 km) from the visitors center is Diamond Caverns. On display there is a stagecoach used to ferry visitors from the nearby Bells Tavern train stop in Park City, Kentucky to both Diamond Caverns and Mammoth Cave.

== Climate ==
According to the Köppen climate classification system, Mammoth Cave National Park has a Humid subtropical climate (Cfa). According to the United States Department of Agriculture, the Plant Hardiness zone at Mammoth Cave National Park Visitor Center at 722 ft (220 m) elevation is 6b with an average annual extreme minimum temperature of -3.2 °F (-19.6 °C).

Climate data for Mammoth Cave National Park, Kentucky (1991–2020 normals, extremes 1934–present)
| Month | Jan | Feb | Mar | Apr | May | Jun | Jul | Aug | Sep | Oct | Nov | Dec | Year |
|---|---|---|---|---|---|---|---|---|---|---|---|---|---|
| Record high °F (°C) | 80 (27) | 82 (28) | 86 (30) | 91 (33) | 96 (36) | 108 (42) | 108 (42) | 105 (41) | 106 (41) | 99 (37) | 93 (34) | 80 (27) | 108 (42) |
| Mean maximum °F (°C) | 65.6 (18.7) | 71.4 (21.9) | 78.4 (25.8) | 85.1 (29.5) | 90.7 (32.6) | 95.2 (35.1) | 96.9 (36.1) | 96.1 (35.6) | 94.0 (34.4) | 86.6 (30.3) | 76.7 (24.8) | 67.5 (19.7) | 98.2 (36.8) |
| Mean daily maximum °F (°C) | 47.9 (8.8) | 53.2 (11.8) | 62.3 (16.8) | 73.4 (23.0) | 81.2 (27.3) | 88.0 (31.1) | 91.0 (32.8) | 90.2 (32.3) | 85.0 (29.4) | 74.0 (23.3) | 61.2 (16.2) | 51.0 (10.6) | 71.5 (21.9) |
| Daily mean °F (°C) | 38.6 (3.7) | 42.7 (5.9) | 50.9 (10.5) | 60.7 (15.9) | 69.0 (20.6) | 76.2 (24.6) | 79.6 (26.4) | 78.5 (25.8) | 72.5 (22.5) | 61.6 (16.4) | 50.5 (10.3) | 42.0 (5.6) | 60.2 (15.7) |
| Mean daily minimum °F (°C) | 29.3 (−1.5) | 32.2 (0.1) | 39.5 (4.2) | 48.0 (8.9) | 56.8 (13.8) | 64.4 (18.0) | 68.3 (20.2) | 66.7 (19.3) | 60.0 (15.6) | 49.1 (9.5) | 39.7 (4.3) | 33.0 (0.6) | 48.9 (9.4) |
| Mean minimum °F (°C) | 4.5 (−15.3) | 10.4 (−12.0) | 18.0 (−7.8) | 29.0 (−1.7) | 38.6 (3.7) | 49.2 (9.6) | 57.0 (13.9) | 54.1 (12.3) | 42.9 (6.1) | 30.1 (−1.1) | 20.0 (−6.7) | 12.1 (−11.1) | 2.7 (−16.3) |
| Record low °F (°C) | −20 (−29) | −21 (−29) | −6 (−21) | 18 (−8) | 27 (−3) | 32 (0) | 40 (4) | 37 (3) | 29 (−2) | 18 (−8) | −8 (−22) | −18 (−28) | −21 (−29) |
| Average precipitation inches (mm) | 3.73 (95) | 4.47 (114) | 5.01 (127) | 4.92 (125) | 5.16 (131) | 4.84 (123) | 4.93 (125) | 3.82 (97) | 3.95 (100) | 3.79 (96) | 4.09 (104) | 4.78 (121) | 53.49 (1,359) |
| Average snowfall inches (cm) | 0.7 (1.8) | 1.4 (3.6) | 0.6 (1.5) | 0.0 (0.0) | 0.0 (0.0) | 0.0 (0.0) | 0.0 (0.0) | 0.0 (0.0) | 0.0 (0.0) | 0.0 (0.0) | 0.0 (0.0) | 1.3 (3.3) | 4.0 (10) |
| Average precipitation days (≥ 0.01 in) | 11.5 | 10.8 | 12.9 | 11.9 | 12.1 | 11.9 | 10.7 | 9.1 | 7.9 | 9.0 | 9.5 | 11.5 | 128.8 |
| Average snowy days (≥ 0.1 in) | 0.4 | 0.7 | 0.6 | 0.1 | 0.0 | 0.0 | 0.0 | 0.0 | 0.0 | 0.0 | 0.0 | 0.4 | 2.1 |
Source: NOAA

== Biology and ecosystem ==
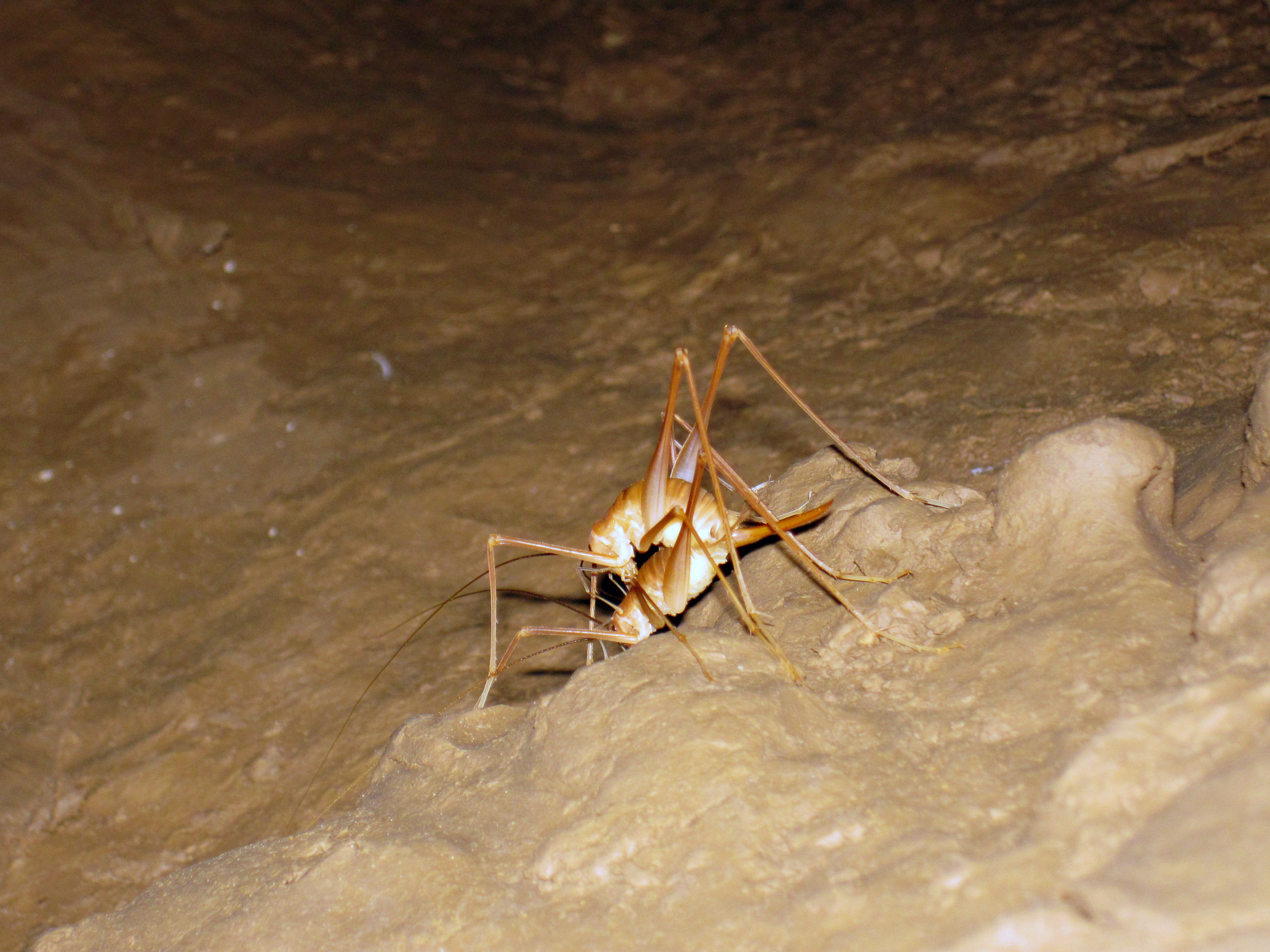
A mating pair of Cave Crickets of the species Hadenoecus subterraneus. Found on a Flint ridge.

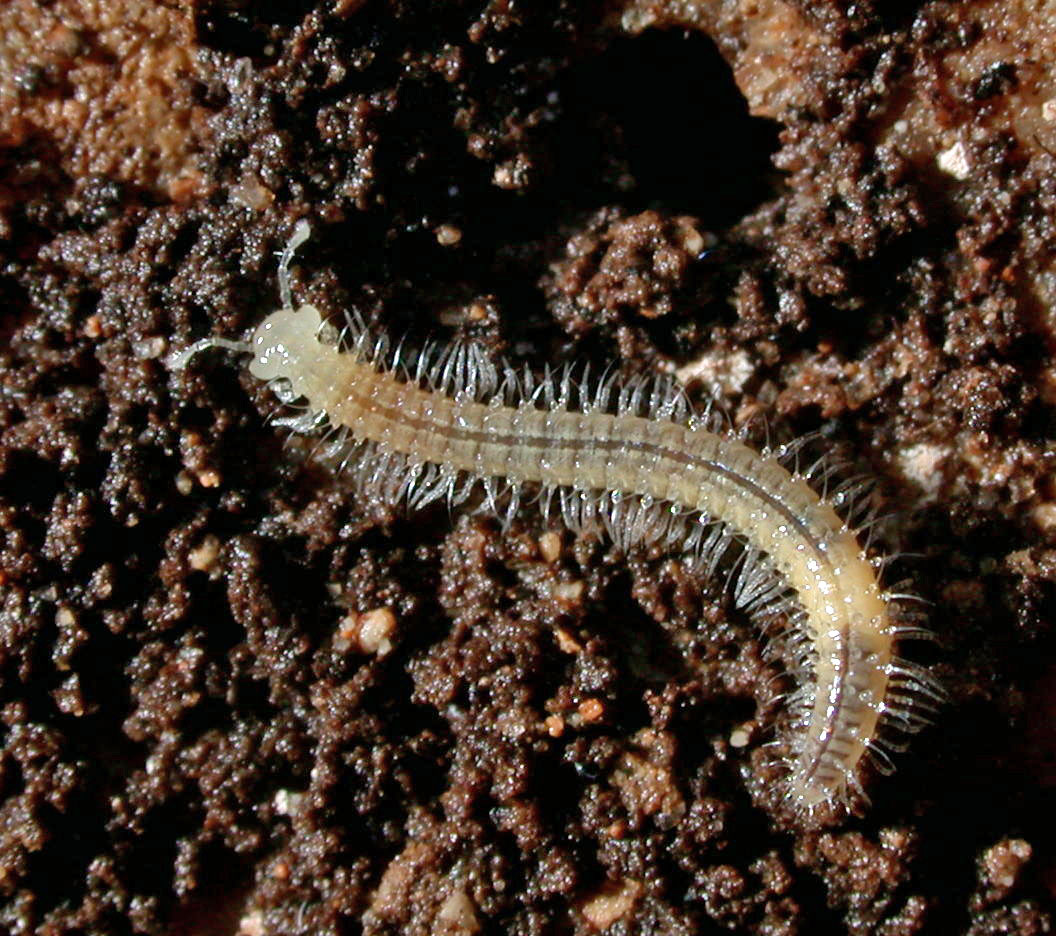
A cave-adapted millipede found in Mammoth cave

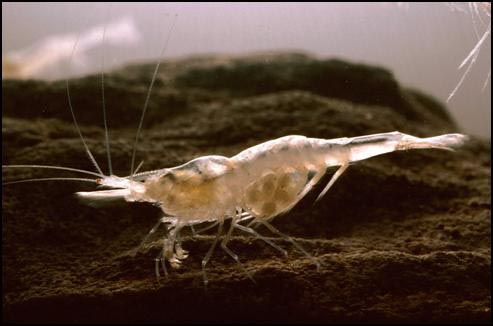
An individual of the species Palaemonias ganteri, also known as the Kentucky cave shrimp. This species is endemic to this cave system.

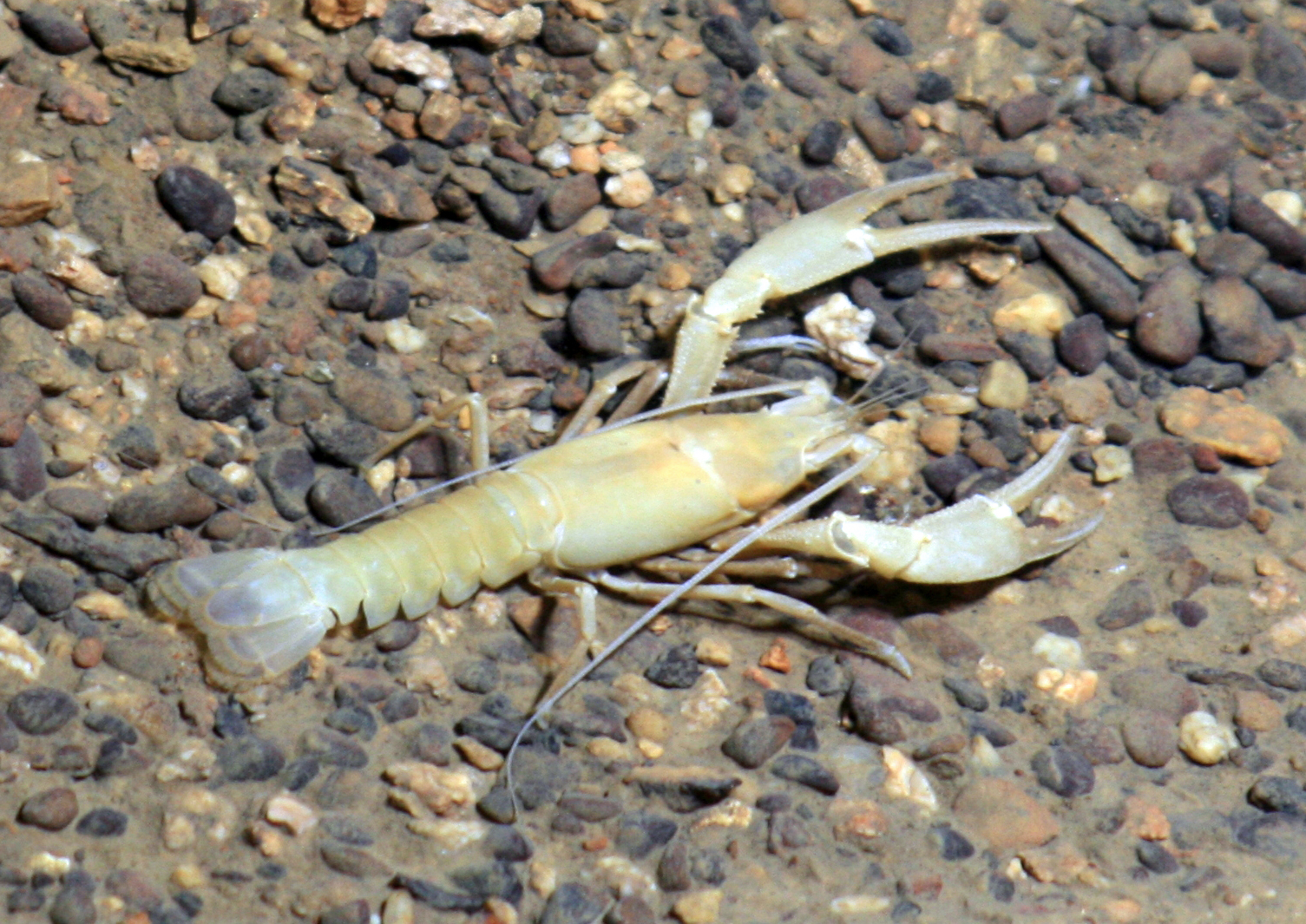
A Cave Crayfish of the species Orconectes pellucidus

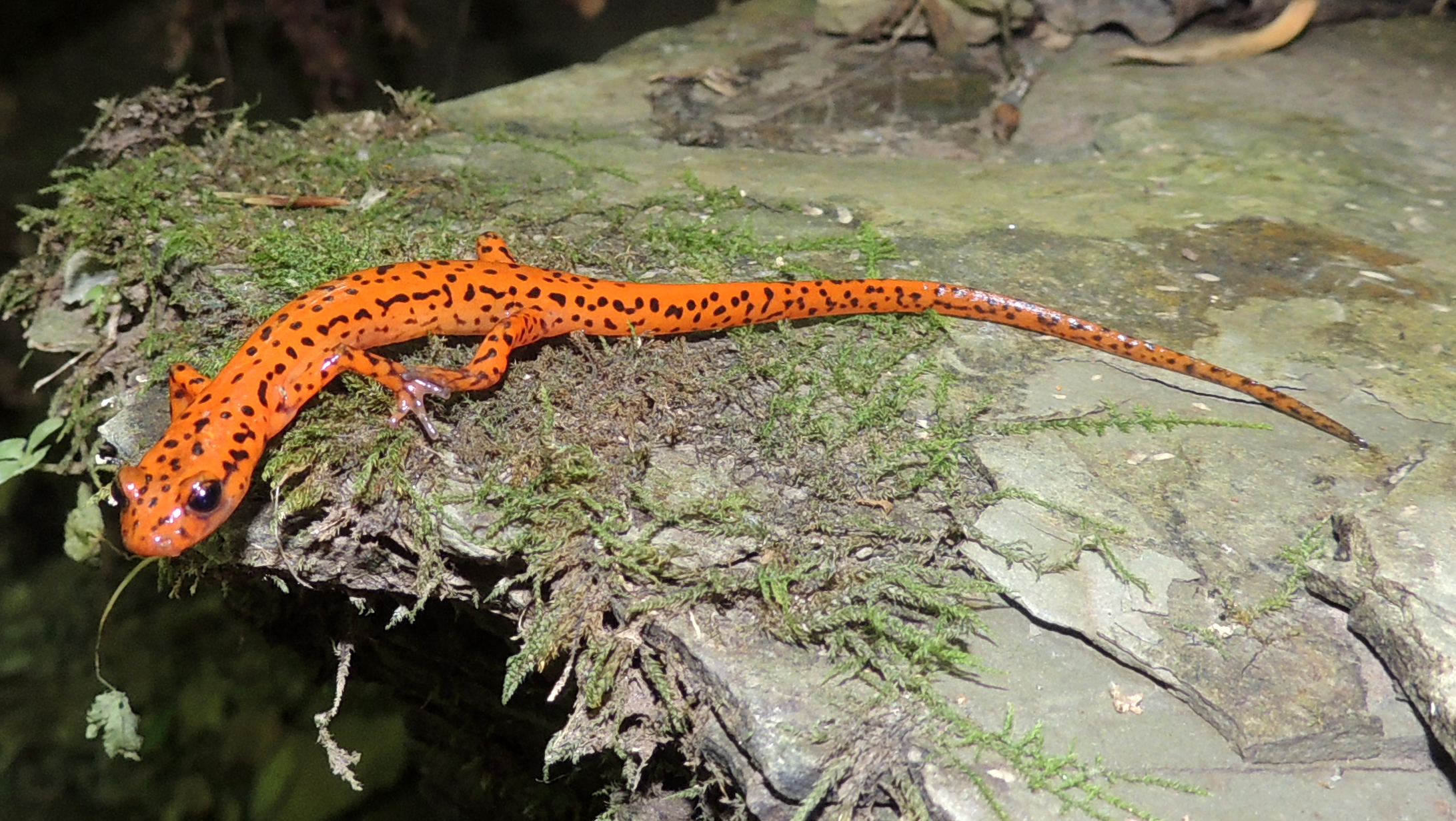
Eurycea lucifuga, also known as the Spotted-tail salamander. Unlike other cave salamanders like the olm, this species has functioning eyes, and still has pigment in its skin.

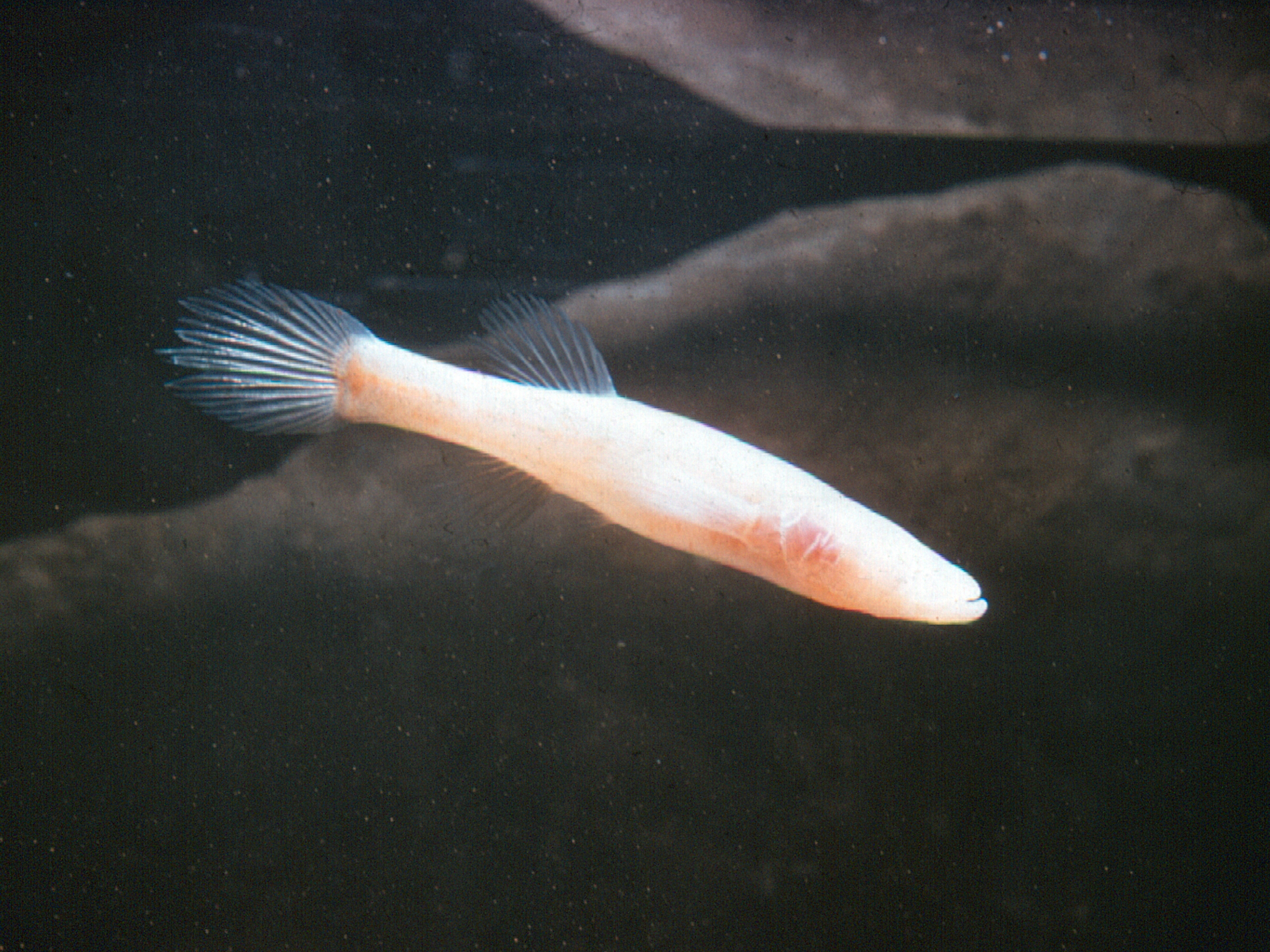
Amblyopsis spelaea (the northern cavefish) is a blind species of cave fish.

The following species of bats inhabit the caverns: Indiana bat (Myotis sodalis), gray bat (Myotis grisescens), little brown bat (Myotis lucifugus), big brown bat (Eptesicus fuscus), and the tricolored bat (Perimyotis subflavus).

All together, these and more rare bat species such as the eastern small-footed bat had estimated populations of 9–12 million just in the Historic Section. While these species still exist in Mammoth Cave, their numbers are now no more than a few thousand at best. Ecological restoration of this portion of Mammoth Cave, and facilitating the return of bats, is an ongoing effort. Not all bat species here inhabit the cave; the red bat (Lasiurus borealis) is a forest-dweller, as found underground only rarely.

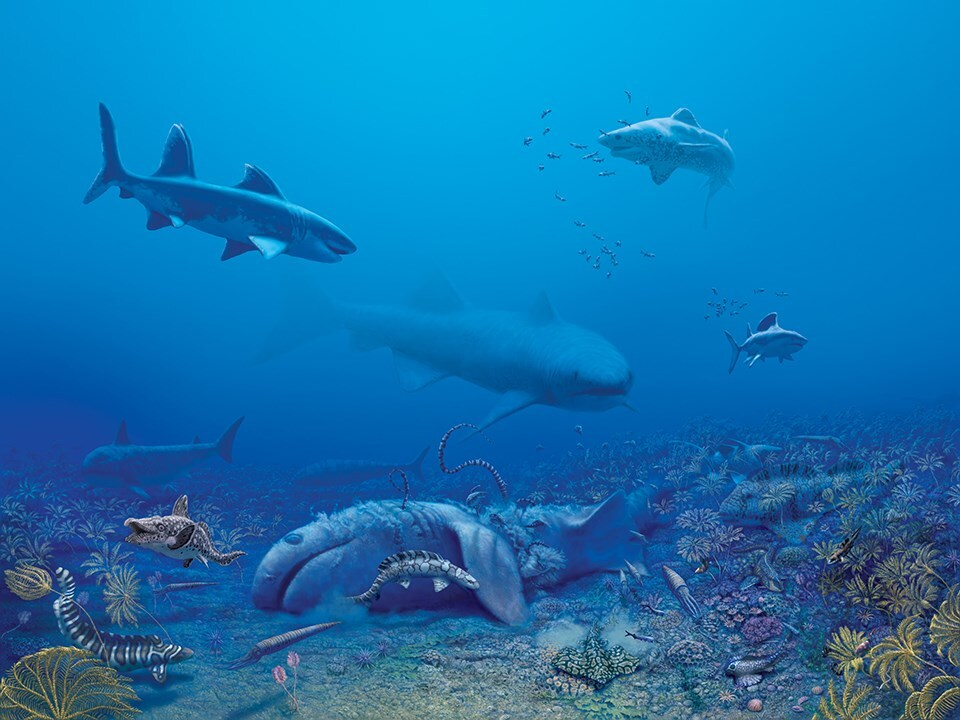
Fossil animals known from the cave

Other animals that inhabit the caves include: three species of cave crickets (Hadenoecus subterraneus, Ceuthophilus stygius, and Ceuthophilus latens), a cave beetle (Pseudanophthalmus inexpectatus), various species of fishing spiders (Dolomedes spp.), a cave salamander (Eurycea lucifuga), two species of eyeless cavefish (Typhlichthys subterraneus and Amblyopsis spelaea), a cave crayfish (Orconectes pellucidus), and the Kentucky cave shrimp (Palaemonias ganteri). In addition, some surface animals may take refuge in the entrances of the caves but do not generally venture into the deep portions of the cavern system.

The section of the Green River that flows through the park is legally designated as "Kentucky Wild River" by the Kentucky General Assembly, through the Office of Kentucky Nature Preserves' Wild Rivers Program.

According to the A. W. Kuchler U.S. Potential natural vegetation Types, Mammoth Cave National Park has an Oak/Hickory (100) potential vegetation type with an Eastern Hardwood Temperate broadleaf and mixed forest (25) potential vegetation form.

Common fossils of the cave include crinoids, blastoids, and gastropods. The Mississippian limestone has yielded fossils of more than a dozen species of shark. In 2020, scientists reported the discovery of part of a Saivodus striatus, a species comparable in size to a modern great white shark. The fossil shark species Glikmanius careforum and Troglocladodus trimblei are known exclusively from within the cave.

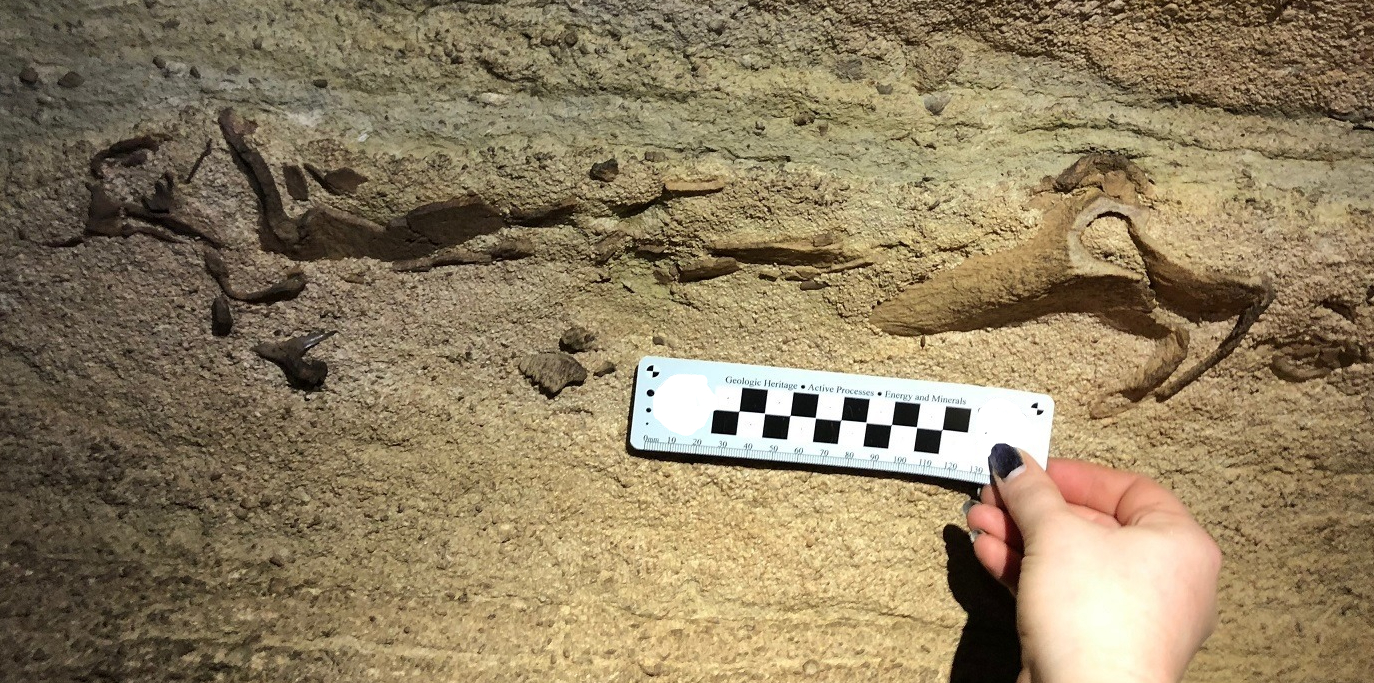
Jaw cartilage of Saivodus striatus found in Mammoth Cave

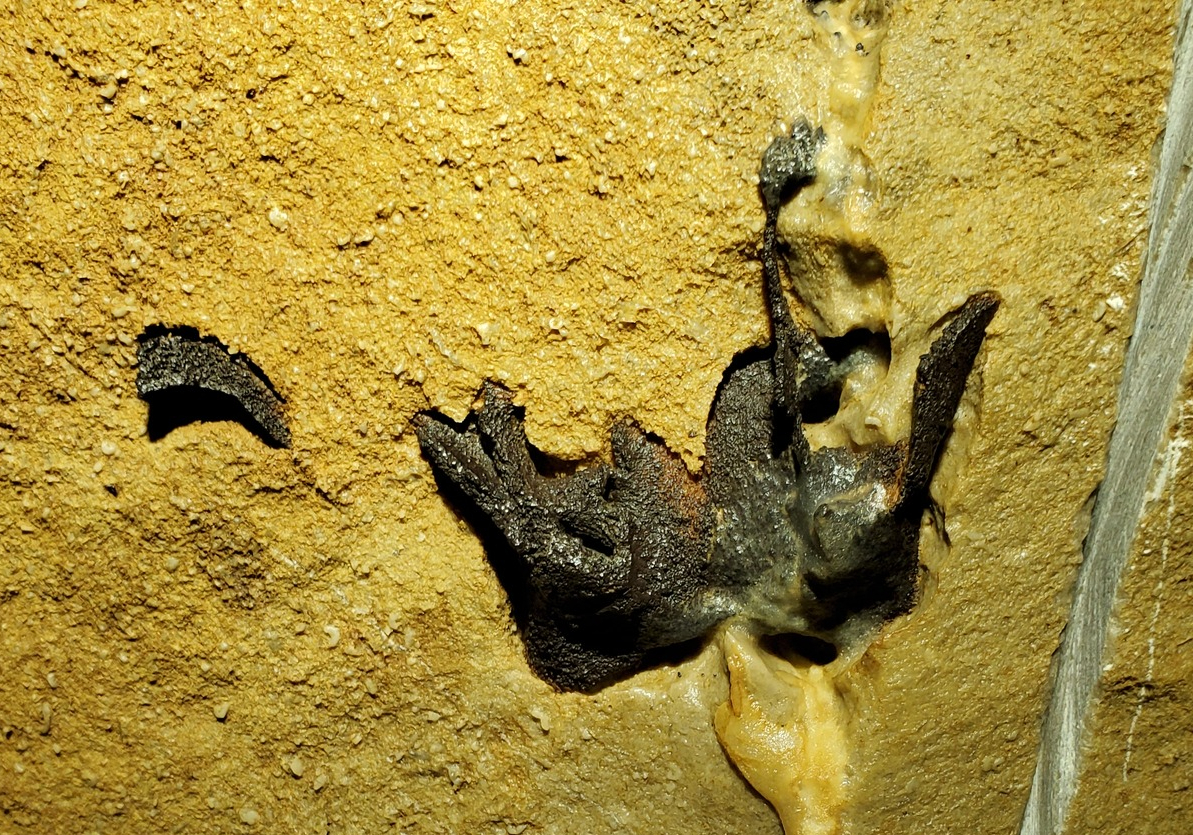
Fossilized braincase of a cartilaginous fish found in Mammoth Cave

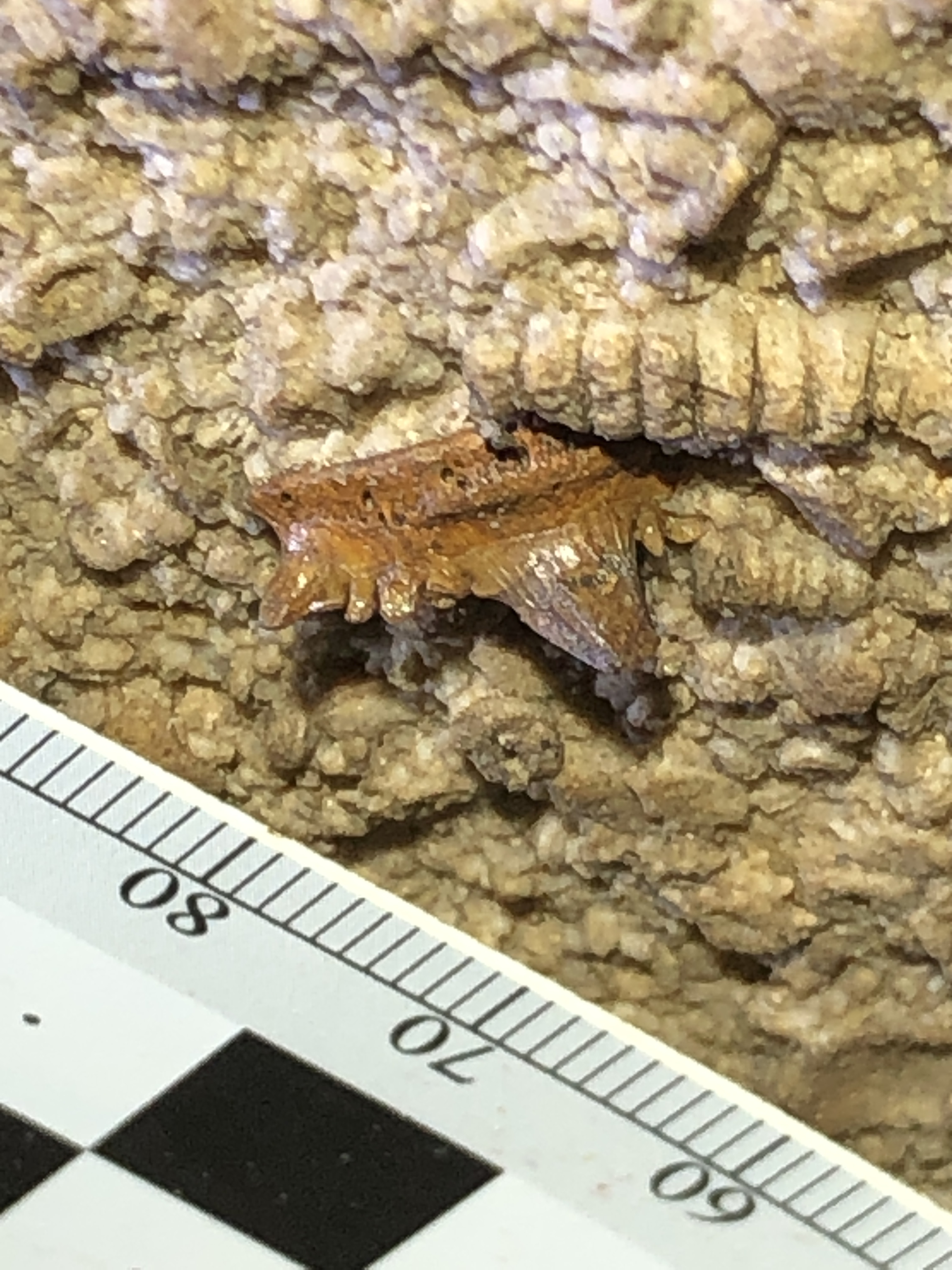
Fossilized tooth of Troglocladodus trimblei, known only from the limestones of Mammoth Cave

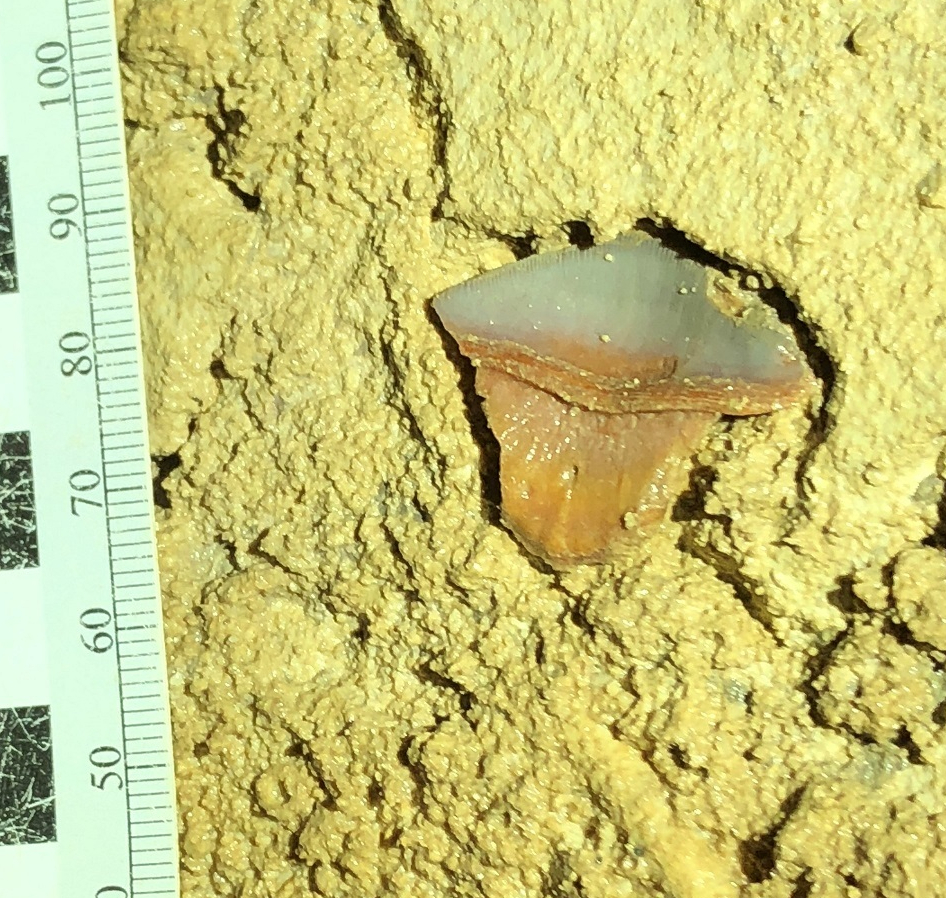
Tooth-plate of a shark-like petalodont fish

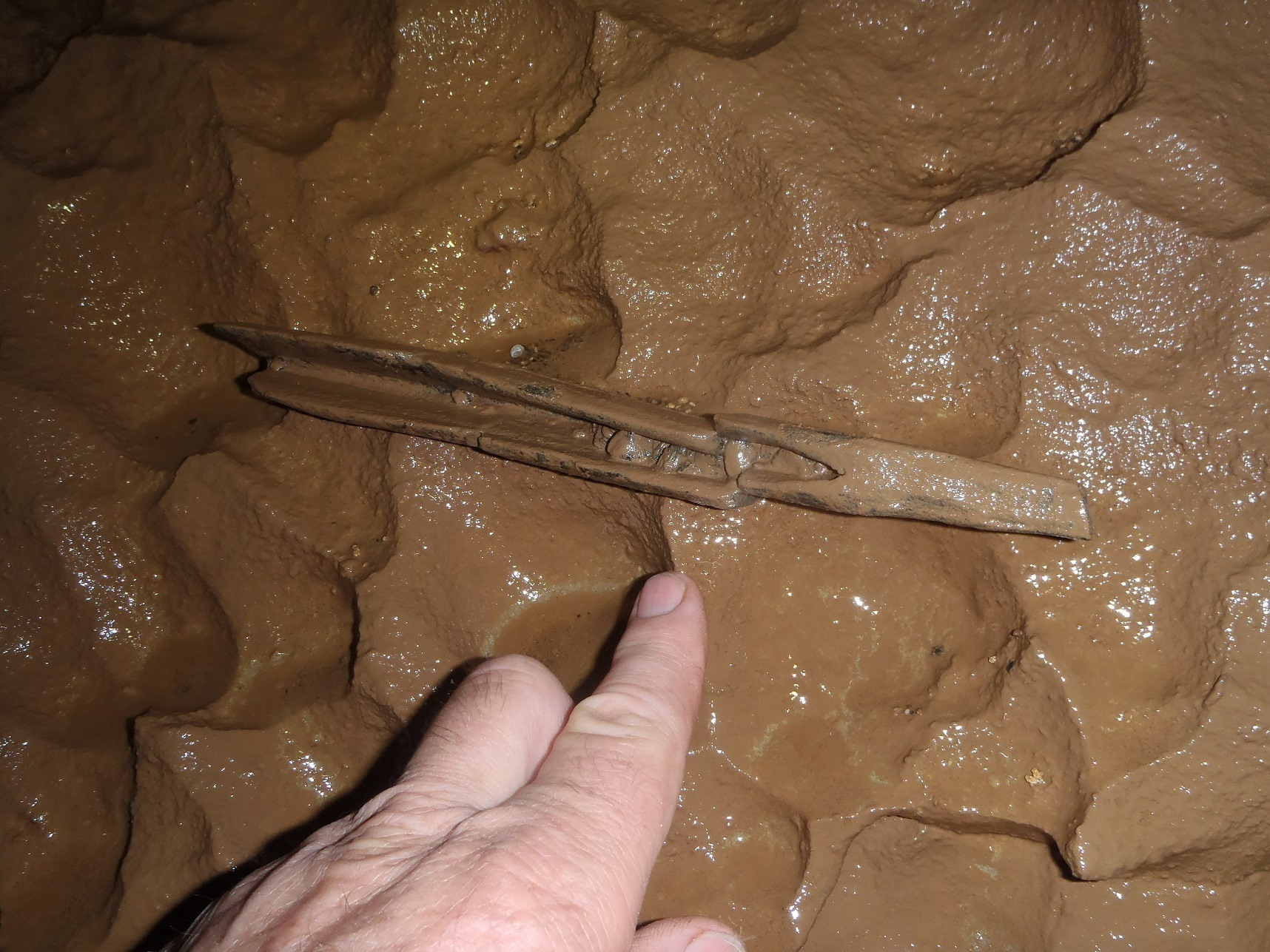
Dorsal fin spine of a ctenacanth shark, exposed from the limestone of Mammoth Cave

== Name ==
The cave's name refers to the large width and length of the passages connecting to the Rotunda just inside the entrance. The name was used long before the extensive cave system was more fully explored and mapped, to reveal a mammoth length of passageways. No fossils of the woolly mammoth have ever been found in Mammoth Cave, and the name of the cave has nothing to do with this extinct mammal.

== Cultural references ==
- A significant amount of the work of American poet Donald Finkel stems from his experiences caving in Mammoth Cave National Park. Examples include "Answer Back" from 1968, and the book-length Going Under, published in 1978.
- The layout for one of the earliest computer games, Will Crowther's 1976 Colossal Cave Adventure, was based partly on the Mammoth Cave system.
- The video game Kentucky Route Zero has a standalone expansion, set between its Acts III and IV, called Here And There Along The Echo, which is a fictionalized hotline number providing information about the Echo River for "drifters" and "pilgrims". The game's third act itself also partially takes place within the Mammoth Cave system, and has references to Colossal Cave Adventure.
- H. P. Lovecraft's 1905 short story "The Beast in the Cave" (published 1918) is set in "the Mammoth Cave".
- American rock band Guided by Voices referenced the cave in the 1990 song "Mammoth Cave" from their album Same Place the Fly Got Smashed.
- The "Kentucky Mammoth Cave" is used as a metaphor for a sperm whale's stomach in chapter 75 of Herman Melville's 1851 novel Moby-Dick.
- Fiction writer Lillie Devereux Blake writing for The Knickerbocker magazine in 1858 told a fictional story of a woman, Melissa, who murdered her tutor who did not return her love, by abandoning him in the cave without a lamp. According to the story, Melissa goes back into the cave fifteen years later to end her misery. Researcher Joe Nickell writing for Skeptical Inquirer magazine explains that this gives "Credulous believers in ghosts... confirmation of their superstitious beliefs" who tell of hearing Melissa weeping and calling out for her murdered tutor. Nickell states that it is common to hear sounds in caves which "the brain interprets (as words and weeping)... it's called pareidolia". Melissa is pure fiction, but author Blake did visit Mammoth Cave with her husband Frank Umsted, "traveling by train, steamer, and stagecoach".
- The rock band Black Stone Cherry reference Mammoth Cave in their 2008 song 'Ghost of Floyd Collins'

== Park superintendents ==
- Robert P. Holland; September 2, 1936 – June 21, 1938; acting
- R. Taylor Hoskins; June 22, 1938 – June 30, 1941; acting
- R. Taylor Hoskins; July 1, 1941 – March 31, 1951
- Thomas C. Miller; April 1, 1951 – June 30, 1954
- Perry E. Brown; July 1, 1954 – September 14, 1963
- Paul McG. Miller; September 15, 1963 – December 30, 1965
- John A. Aubuchon; January 2, 1966 – September 7, 1968
- Robert H. Bendt; September 8, 1968 – January 23, 1971; assigned line supervision of Abraham Lincoln Birthplace National Historic Site, September 2, 1970 – April 27, 1975
- Joseph Kulesza; February 21, 1971 – May 31, 1976
- Albert A. Hawkins; July 4, 1976 – August 11, 1979
- Robert L. Deskins; August 12, 1979 – September 1, 1984
- Richard N. Strange; September 2, 1984 – December 8, 1984; acting
- Franklin D. Pridemore; December 9, 1984 – January 2, 1988
- David A. Mihalic; January 3, 1988 – July 1994
- Ronald R. Switzer; March 1995 – January 2005
- Bruce Powell; January 2005 – January 2006; acting
- Patrick Reed; January 2006 – 2012
- Sarah J. Craighead; November 2012 – July 2017
- Barclay Trimble; July 2017 – Present

The list is incomplete.

== See also ==
- Carlsbad Caverns National Park
- Colossal Cavern
- Karst topography
- List of national parks of the United States
- List of longest caves
- List of caves
- List of Biosphere Reserves in the United States
- List of caves in the United States
- List of longest caves in the United States
- Index of conservation articles
- Speleology

== Bibliography ==
=== General references ===
- Bridwell, Margaret M. (Bridwell 1952) The Story of Mammoth Cave National Park Kentucky: A Brief History 11th Edition 1971. (First edition copyright 1952.) No ISBN.
- Hoskins, R. Taylor Faithful Visitor First Park Superintendent R. Taylor Hoskins describes the yearly visits of "Pete" a tame summer tanager (Piranga rubra). In The Regional Review, Vol VII, 1 and 2 (July–August 1941)
- Hovey, Horace Carter (Hovey 1880) One Hundred Miles in Mammoth Cave in 1880: an early exploration of America's most famous cavern. with introductory note by William R. Jones. Golden, Colorado: Outbooks. (Copyright 1982) ISBN 0-89646-054-1
- Hovey, Horace Carter Hovey's Handbook of The Mammoth Cave of Kentucky: A Practical Guide to the Regulation Routes. (John P. Morton & Company, Louisville, Kentucky, 1909). Full text transcription.
- Montfort, Nick (2005). Twisty Little Passages: An Approach To Interactive Fiction. Cambridge: The MIT Press. ISBN 0-262-13436-5.
- Watson, Richard A., ed. (Watson 1981) The Cave Research Foundation: Origins and the First Twelve Years 1957–1968 Mammoth Cave, Kentucky: Cave Research Foundation.

=== Brucker series ===
Roger W. Brucker has co-authored four nonfiction books and authored one historical novel on the history and exploration of the Mammoth Cave System. They are presented here not in the order of publication, but in the order in which the events of the books' major narratives took place:

- Brucker, Roger W. (2009) Grand, Gloomy, and Peculiar: Stephen Bishop at Mammoth Cave. Cave Books. ISBN 978-0-939748-72-3 (hbk) ISBN 978-0-939748-71-6 (pbk). Based on the true story of Stephen Bishop, the slave who gained fame as a guide and explorer at Mammoth Cave from 1838 until his death in 1857, this historical novel is written from the perspective of Bishop's wife, Charlotte. Although it is a novel, Brucker has claimed the book does not alter any known historical facts.
- Brucker, Roger W. and Murray, Robert K. (Brucker and Murray 1983) Trapped: The Story of Floyd Collins. University of Kentucky Press. Told by a scholar of early 20th century journalism and a veteran of the modern period of Mammoth Cave exploration, this book details the events of the entrapment and attempted rescue of Floyd Collins, who was trapped in a cave near Mammoth Cave in January 1925.
- Lawrence Jr., Joe and Brucker, Roger W. (Lawrence and Brucker 1955) The Caves Beyond: The story of the Floyd Collins' Crystal Cave Expedition New York: Funk and Wagnalls. Reprinted, with new introduction, by Zephyrus Press ISBN 0-914264-18-4 (pbk.) Details the story of the 1954 week-long C3 expedition from the separate points of view of the leader and an ordinary participant in the expedition, who went on to become one of the leaders of the then-nascent modern period of exploration.
- Brucker, Roger W. and Watson, Richard A. "Red" (Brucker and Watson 1976) The Longest Cave. New York : Knopf (reprinted 1987, with afterword: Carbondale, Illinois: Southern Illinois University Press) ISBN 0-8093-1322-7 (pbk.) A comprehensive story of the exploration of Mammoth Cave told by two of the founders of the Cave Research Foundation. An invaluable appendix, "Historical Beginnings", outlines the story of the cave from prehistory to the mid-1950s, where the main narrative begins. The formation of the Cave Research Foundation is described from an insider perspective. A highly personal telling, this work is sometimes jokingly or with irony referred to by cavers as Roger and Red Go Caving, though its revered status in the literature and the reputations of the authors are hardly in doubt. The 1989 reprint includes an Afterword by the authors referring to the 1983 Roppel–Mammoth connection and other subsequent events.
- Borden, James D. and Brucker, Roger W. (Borden and Brucker 2000) Beyond Mammoth Cave: A Tale of Obsession in the World's Longest Cave. Carbondale and Edwardsville, Illinois: Southern Illinois University Press. ISBN 0-8093-2346-X. Taking up where The Longest Cave leaves off, carries the story of Mammoth Cave Exploration from September 10, 1972, to September 10, 1983, when a connection was surveyed between Roppel Cave and the southern reaches of Mammoth Cave. Details the origins of the Central Kentucky Karst Coalition (CKKC).

=== Archaeology ===
- Meloy, Harold (Meloy 1968) Mummies of Mammoth Cave: An account of the Indian mummies discovered in Short Cave, Salts Cave, and Mammoth Cave, Kentucky Shelbyville, Indiana: Micron Publishing Co., 1990 (Original copyright 1968, 1977).
- Watson, Patty Jo (ed.) (Watson 1974) Archaeology of the Mammoth Cave Area. Reprinted 1997 by St. Louis: Cave Books ISBN 0-939748-41-X. 31 chapters by the foremost worker in the field of Mammoth Cave archaeology and several of her colleagues. The reprinted edition includes a brief new introduction and a brief updated bibliography.

Carstens, Kenneth C (1980) Archaeological Investigations in the Central Kentucky Karst, 2 vols., Doctoral dissertation, Dep't of Anthropology, Washington University in St. Louis. Carstens, Kenneth C (1973) Archaeological Reconnaissance in Mammoth Cave National Park. Master's thesis, Department of Anthropology, Washington University in St. Louis.

=== Geology ===
- Brown, Richmond F. (Brown 1966). Hydrology of the Cavernous Limestones of the Mammoth Cave Area, Kentucky [Geological Survey Water-Supply Paper 1837]. Washington, D.C.: United States Government Printing Office.
- Livesay, Ann, and McGrain, Preston (revised) (Livesay and McGrain 1962). Geology of the Mammoth Cave National Park Area. Kentucky Geological Survey, Series X, 1962. Special Publication 7, College of Arts and Sciences, University of Kentucky. Lexington, Kentucky: University of Kentucky.
- Palmer, Arthur N. (Palmer 1981) A Geological Guide to Mammoth Cave National Park. Teaneck, New Jersey: Zephyrus Press. ISBN 0-914264-28-1. 196 pp. From the "blurb" on the back cover: "How did Mammoth Cave form? How old is it? Why does it look the way it does? What do the rocks tell us? These and many other questions are answered in this book about America's most popular cave." Written for the lay reader, but with much technical information of interest to those with greater scientific literacy, by a retired professor of geology at SUNY Oneonta.
- White, William B. and Elizabeth L., eds. (White and White 1989) Karst Hydrology: Concepts from the Mammoth Cave Area. New York: Van Nostrand Rheinhold. ISBN 0-442-22675-6.
