= Patty Jo Watson =

American archaeologist (1932–2024)

- Born: April 26, 1932; Superior, Nebraska, U.S.
- Died: August 1, 2024 (aged 92); Arlington, Massachusetts, U.S.
- Known for: Processual Archaeology, Cave Archaeology
- Spouse: Richard "Red" Watson

Academic background
- Education: University of Chicago
- Thesis: Early-village farming in the Levant and its environment. (1959)
- Doctoral advisor: Robert John Braidwood

Academic work
- Discipline: Archaeology

Patty Jo Watson (April 26, 1932 – August 1, 2024) was an American archaeologist noted for her work on Pre-Columbian Native Americans, especially in the Mammoth Cave region of Kentucky. Her early investigations focused on the origins of agriculture and pastoralism in the Near East.

Watson was a Distinguished University Professor Emerita, Archaeology at Washington University in St. Louis. Until her retirement in 2004, she was the Edward Mallinckrodt Distinguished University Professor of Archaeology at Washington University in St. Louis.

== Early life and education ==
Watson was born in Superior, Nebraska, on April 26, 1932. In 1952, Watson, a junior at Iowa State, transferred into a three-year master's program at the University of Chicago. In 1953, Watson attended the University of Arizona's Point of Pines field school where she became interested in flotation techniques. Later from 1954 to 1955, Watson participated in the Iraq-Jarmo Project in Northern Iraq as a field assistant to Robert Braidwood.

Watson earned her M.A. in 1956 and her Ph.D. in 1959 from the University of Chicago. Watson's dissertation examined "Early Village Farming in the Levant and its Environment."

== Career ==
Watson devoted much of her early career to the archaeological study of the Ancient Near East. Her husband Richard A. Watson convinced her to change her focus from Near Eastern archaeology to work in North America.

Watson was a proponent of processual archaeology and has contributed greatly to that approach.

In addition, Watson has been instrumental in applying ethnography to the archaeological record. In the 1960s in Mammoth Cave, she introduced the practice of performing recreations of ancient lifeways as a method of filling in gaps from incomplete archaeological data. "She has contributed centrally to techniques for recovering carbonized plant remains from archaeological deposits and to understanding the independent origin of pre-maize agriculture in pre-Columbian eastern North America." Her work on the diet of Native Americans who lived in Mammoth Cave has included examining the intestines of bodies found in the cave and has been notably interdisciplinary in scope.

Watson was hired to teach anthropology at Washington University in St. Louis in 1968. She retired in 2004.

== Death ==
Watson died in Arlington, Massachusetts, on August 1, 2024, at the age of 92.

== Accolades ==
In 1988, Watson was elected to the National Academy of Sciences. She was elected a Member of the American Philosophical Society in 2000. In its November 2002 issue, Discover included Watson among "The 50 Most Important Women in Science." The article credited Watson with "establishing the best qualitative and quantitative data for an early agricultural complex in North America" and with helping to "introduce the scientific method into archaeological studies." Watson received the Gold Medal Award for Distinguished Archaeological Achievement in 1999, and the Pomerance Award for Scientific Contributions to Archaeology in 2007 from the Archaeological Institute of America. The Southeastern Archaeological Conference gives an award in her name.

== Selected publications ==
- 1971 Explanation in Archeology: An Explicitly Scientific Approach
- 1974 Archaeology of the Mammoth Cave Area. Academic Press, New York.
- 1979 The razor's edge: Symbolic-structuralist archaeology and the expansion of archaeological inference, with comments by Michael Fotiadis. American Anthropologist 92:613-629.
- 1995 Archaeology, anthropology, and the culture concept. American Anthropologist 97:683-694.
- 1996 Of caves and shell mounds in West-Central Kentucky. In Of Caves and Shell Mounds. Co-edited with Kenneth Carstens. Tuscaloosa: University of Alabama Press.
- 1999 From the Hilly Flanks of the Fertile Crescent to the Eastern Woodlands of North America. In Grit-Tempered: Early Women Archaeologists in the Southeastern United States, edited by N.M. White, L.P. Sullivan and R.A. Marrinan. Gainesville: University of Florida Press, pp. 286–297.
- 1999 Ethnographic Analogy and Ethnoarchaeology. In Archaeology, History and Culture in Palestine and the Near East: Essays in Memory of Albert E. Glock, edited by T. Kapitan. American Schools of Oriental Research, ASOR Books, Volume 3. Atlanta, GA: Scholar's Press, pp. 47–65.
