= Roger Brucker =

American cave explorer and author

- Roger Brucker, 2006
- Born: July 27, 1929 (age 97); Shelby, Ohio, USA
- Known for: Cave Explorer and Author

Roger W. Brucker (born July 27, 1929) is an American cave explorer and author of books about caves. He is most closely associated with Mammoth Cave in Kentucky, the world's longest cave, which he has been exploring and writing about since 1954.

== Early life and education ==
After graduating from Oberlin College with an art degree in 1951, Brucker enlisted in the U.S. Air Force and was stationed at Wright-Patterson Air Force Base near Dayton, Ohio where he wrote and directed documentary, technical and training films.

While in the Air Force, Brucker was temporarily stationed in New York City, where he became friends with some people who introduced him to caving, through the National Speleological Society (NSS). He participated in Floyd Collins' Crystal Cave (C-3) Expedition in Kentucky in 1954, in which dozens of explorers spent one week underground, in an effort to determine if Crystal Cave might be connected with other caves. Although such connections were not found at that time (they later were), the expedition set new standards for organized cave exploration, and became the subject of Brucker's first book, The Caves Beyond, which he co-authored with Joe Lawrence, Jr.

== Career ==
Convinced that Crystal Cave would one day connect with caves in nearby Mammoth Cave National Park, Brucker and other explorers formed the Cave Research Foundation (CRF), to survey and study Mammoth Cave and other caves in the area. Through the late 1950s and 60s, CRF expanded the known reaches of Mammoth Cave and other caves under the adjoining Flint Ridge. In 1972, cavers found a connection between Mammoth Cave and the Flint Ridge Cave System. That discovery made Mammoth the world's longest cave, inspiring Brucker and Richard Watson to write The Longest Cave.

Brucker began working on the book Trapped! The Story of Floyd Collins with historian Robert K. Murray. Brucker had long been fascinated with the true story of Floyd Collins, who was trapped in a cave in 1925 and could not be rescued, despite a massive effort that received national attention. The authors interviewed dozens of witnesses and studied hundreds of documents to uncover facts about the tragedy that were not previously known. As part of the research, Brucker and a small group of explorers even ventured into Sand Cave several times to the spot where Collins was trapped, to better understand why rescuers had been unable to free him. Trapped! was published in 1979. The book helped to inspire the stage musical Floyd Collins by playwright Tina Landau and composer Adam Guettel. In 2006, the book was optioned by actor Billy Bob Thornton, who planned to develop it into a movie. A screenplay was written by Thornton's writing partner, Tom Epperson, and the project was reportedly greenlit by Paramount Pictures. However, Thornton's option expired, and rights to the book were then acquired by producer Peter R.J. Deyell in 2011.

In 1983, rival groups of explorers, including Brucker, discovered a connection between Mammoth Cave and nearby Roppel Cave, further expanding the known reaches of the Mammoth Cave system beyond the boundaries of the national park. Brucker later teamed up with James Borden to write Beyond Mammoth Cave: A Tale of Obsession in the World's Longest Cave.

In 2009, Brucker's fifth book and first historical novel was published. Grand, Gloomy, and Peculiar: Stephen Bishop at Mammoth Cave is based on the true story of Stephen Bishop, a slave who gained fame as a guide and explorer at Mammoth Cave in the 1840s and 50s.

== Books ==
- The Caves Beyond with Joe Lawrence, Jr. (1955), ISBN 0-914264-18-4 / ISBN 978-0-914264-18-7
- The Longest Cave with Richard A. Watson, Ph.D. (1976) ISBN 0-8093-1322-7 / ISBN 978-0-8093-1322-8
- Trapped! The Story of Floyd Collins
- Beyond Mammoth Cave: A Tale of Obsession in the World's Longest Cave with James D. Borden (2001), ISBN 0-8093-2346-X / ISBN 978-0-8093-2346-3
- Grand, Gloomy, and Peculiar: Stephen Bishop at Mammoth Cave (2009), ISBN 978-0-939748-72-3 (pb) / ISBN 978-0-939748-71-6 (hb)
