= Croghan =

Croghan may refer to:

== Places ==
=== Ireland ===
- Croghan (village), County Offaly, Ireland
- Croghan, County Roscommon, Ireland
- Croghan Hill, a 234 metres (768 ft) hill in County Offaly, Ireland
- Croghan Mountain, a 606 metres (1,988 ft) peak in the Wicklow Mountains, Ireland

=== United States ===
- Croghan (town), New York
- Croghan (village), New York
- Mount Croghan, South Carolina

== People ==
- Davis Croghan (1832–1890), priest
- George Croghan (disambiguation), various people
- John Croghan (1790–1849), physician
- Mark Croghan (born 1968), American middle-distance runner
