= Thule =

Island mentioned in Ancient Greek and Roman literature

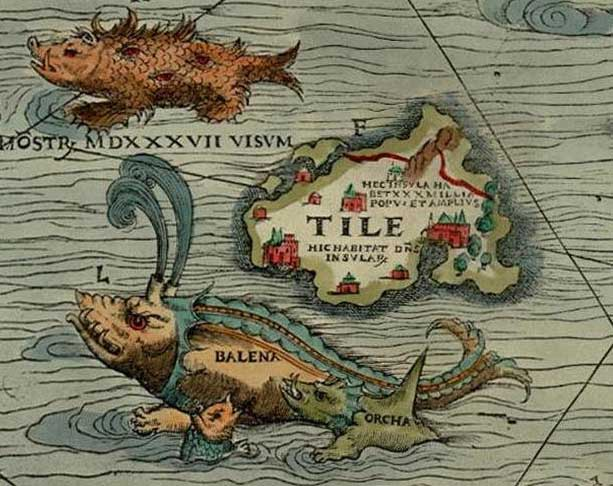
Thule as Tile on the Carta marina of 1539 by Olaus Magnus, where it is shown located to the northwest of the Orkney islands, with a "monster, seen in 1537", a whale ("balena"), and an orca nearby

Thule (/ˈθ(j)uː.liː/, TH(Y)OO-lee; Ancient Greek: Θούλη, romanized: Thúlē; Latin: Thūlē also spelled as Thylē) is the most northerly location (if not Hyperborea) mentioned in ancient Greek and Roman literature and cartography. First written of by the Greek explorer Pytheas of Massalia (modern-day Marseille, France) in about 320 BC, it was often described by later writers as an island north of Ireland or Britain, despite that Pytheas never explicitly described it as an island. Modern interpretations have included Orkney, Shetland, Northern Scotland, the Faroe Islands, and Iceland. Other potential locations are the island of Saaremaa in Estonia, or the Norwegian island of Smøla.

In classical and medieval literature, ultima Thule (Latin "farthest Thule") acquired a metaphorical meaning of any distant place located beyond the "borders of the known world". By the Late Middle Ages and the early modern period, the Greco-Roman Thule was often identified with the real Iceland or Greenland. Sometimes Ultima Thule was a Latin name for Greenland, when Thule was used for Iceland. By the 19th century, Thule was frequently identified with Norway, Denmark, the whole of Scandinavia, one of the larger Scottish islands, the Faroes, or several of those locations.

Thule formerly gave its name to real places. In 1910, the explorer Knud Rasmussen established a missionary and trading post in northwestern Greenland, which he named "Thule". It later gave its name to the northernmost United States Air Force base, Thule Air Base, in northwest Greenland. With the transfer of the base to the United States Space Force, its name was changed to Pituffik Space Base on April 6, 2023.

== Classical and medieval accounts ==
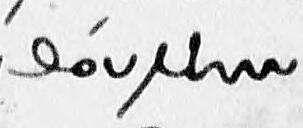
Thule (Θούλην) in Strabo's Geographica, from an 11th century manuscript.

The Greek explorer Pytheas of the Greek city of Massalia (now Marseille, France) is the first to have written of Thule, after his travels between 330 and 320 BC. Pytheas mentioned going to Thule in his now lost work, On The Ocean Τὰ περὶ τοῦ Ὠκεανοῦ (Ta peri tou Okeanou). L. Sprague de Camp wrote that "the city of Massalia... sent Pytheas to scout northern Europe to see where their trade-goods were coming from." Descriptions of some of his discoveries have survived in the works of later, often skeptical, authors.

Polybius in his work The Histories (c. 140 BC), Book XXXIV, cites Pytheas as one "who has led many people into error by saying that he traversed the whole of Britain on foot, giving the island a circumference of forty thousand stadia, and telling us also about Thule, those regions in which there was no longer any proper land nor sea nor air, but a sort of mixture of all three of the consistency of a jellyfish in which one can neither walk nor sail, holding everything together, so to speak."

The first century BC Greek astronomer Geminus of Rhodes claimed that the name Thule went back to an archaic word for the polar night phenomenon – "the place where the sun goes to rest". Dionysius Periegetes in his De situ habitabilis orbis also touched upon this subject, as did Martianus Capella. Avienius in his Ora Maritima added that during the summer on Thule night lasted only two hours, a clear reference to the midnight sun.

Strabo, in his Geographica (c. AD 30), mentions Thule in describing Eratosthenes' calculation of "the breadth of the inhabited world" and notes that Pytheas says it "is a six days' sail north of Britain, and is near the frozen sea". But he then doubts this claim, writing that Pytheas has "been found, upon scrutiny, to be an arch falsifier, but the men who have seen Britain and Ireland do not mention Thule, though they speak of other islands, small ones, about Britain". Strabo adds the following in Book 5:

"Now Pytheas of Massilia tells us that Thule, the most northerly of the Britannic Islands, is farthest north, and that there the circle of the summer tropic is the same as the Arctic Circle. But from the other writers I learn nothing on the subject – neither that there exists a certain island by the name of Thule, nor whether the northern regions are inhabitable up to the point where the summer tropic becomes the Arctic Circle."

Strabo ultimately concludes, "Concerning Thule, our historical information is still more uncertain, on account of its outside position; for Thule, of all the countries that are named, is set farthest north." The inhabitants or people of Thule are described in most detail by Strabo (citing Pytheas):

"the people (of Thule) live on millet and other herbs, and on fruits and roots; and where there are grain and honey, the people get their beverage, also, from them. As for the grain, he says, since they have no pure sunshine, they pound it out in large storehouses, after first gathering in the ears thither; for the threshing floors become useless because of this lack of sunshine and because of the rains".

The mid-first century Roman geographer Pomponius Mela placed Thule north of Scythia.

In AD 77, Pliny the Elder published his Natural History in which he also cites Pytheas' claim (in Book II, Chapter 75) that Thule is a six-day sail north of Britain. Then, when discussing the islands around Britain, he writes:

"The farthest of all, which are known and spoke of, is Thule; in which there be no nights at all, as we have declared, about mid-summer, namely when the Sun passes through the sign Cancer; and contrariwise no days in mid-winter: and each of these times they suppose, do last six months, all day, or all night."

Finally, in refining the island's location, he places it along the most northerly parallel of those he describes: "Last of all is the Scythian parallel, from the Rhiphean hills into Thule: wherein (as we said) it is day and night continually by turns (for six months)."

Cleomedes referenced Pytheas' journey to Thule, but added no new information.

The Roman poet Silius Italicus (AD 25 – 101) wrote that the people of Thule were painted blue: "the blue-painted native of Thule, when he fights, drives around the close-packed ranks in his scythe-bearing chariot", implying a link to the Picts (whose exonym is derived from the Latin pictus "painted"). Martial (AD 40 – 104) talks about "blue" and "painted Britons", just like Julius Caesar. Claudian (AD 370 – 404) also believed that the inhabitants of Thule were Picts.

The Roman historian Tacitus, in his book chronicling the life of his father-in-law, Agricola, describes how the Romans knew that Britain (in which Agricola was Roman commander) was an island rather than a continent: by circumnavigating it. Tacitus writes of a Roman ship visiting Orkney and claims the ship's crew even sighted Thule. However their orders were not to explore there, as winter was at hand. Some scholars believe that Tacitus was referring to Shetland.

The third-century Latin grammarian Gaius Julius Solinus wrote in his Polyhistor that "Thyle, which was distant from Orkney by a voyage of five days and nights, was fruitful and abundant in the lasting yield of its crops". The fourth-century Virgilian commentator Servius also believed that Thule sat close to Orkney:

"Thule; an island in the Ocean between the northern and western zone, beyond Britain, near Orkney and Ireland; in this Thule, when the sun is in Cancer, it is said that there are perpetual days without nights..."

Other late classical writers such as Orosius (384–420) describe Thule as being north and west of both Ireland and Britain, strongly suggesting that it was Iceland.

Solinus (d. AD 400) in his Polyhistor, repeated these descriptions, noting that the people of Thule had a fertile land where they grew a good production of crop and fruits.

Early in the fifth century AD Claudian, in his poem, On the Fourth Consulship of the Emperor Honorius, Book VIII, rhapsodizes on the conquests of the emperor Theodosius I, declaring that the Orcades "ran red with Saxon slaughter; Thule was warm with the blood of Picts; ice-bound Hibernia [Ireland] wept for the heaps of slain Scots". This implies that Thule was Scotland. But in Against Rufinias, the Second Poem, Claudian writes of "Thule lying icebound beneath the pole-star". Jordanes in his Getica also wrote that Thule sat under the pole star.

In the writings of the historian Procopius, from the first half of the sixth century, Thule is a large island in the north inhabited by 13 tribes. It is believed that Procopius is really talking about a part of Scandinavia, since several tribes are easily identified, including the Geats (Gautoi) in present-day Sweden and the Sami people (Scrithiphini). He also writes that when the Herules returned, they passed the Warini and the Danes and then crossed the sea to Thule, where they settled beside the Geats. Procopius's Thule is believed to be the same place as Scandza, as described by Jordanes. Procopius says its inhabitants are pagans who practice human sacrifice.

According to Procopius, the sun doesn't rise for forty days around the time of the winter solstice (equivalent to around 69° North) in Thule. After the winter solstice, the people of Thule send men to the mountaintops, and when they first glimpse the sun above the horizon, they send word to the people in the valleys below. On hearing the good news, the people of Thule then celebrate their greatest festival.

In the early seventh century, Isidore of Seville wrote in his Etymologies that:

Ultima Thule (Thyle ultima) is an island of the Ocean in the northwestern region, beyond Britannia, taking its name from the sun, because there the sun makes its summer solstice, and there is no daylight beyond (ultra) this. Hence its sea is sluggish and frozen.

Isidore distinguished this from the islands of Britannia, Thanet (Tanatos), Orkney (Orcades), and Ireland (Scotia or Hibernia). Isidore was to have a large influence upon Bede, who was later to mention Thule. The Irish monk Dicuil in his "Liber De Mensura Orbis Terrae" (written circa 825) after quoting various classical sources describing Thule, says

"It is now thirty years since clerics, who had lived on the island from the first of February to the first of August, told me that not only at the summer solstice, but in the days round about it, the sun setting in the evening hides itself as though behind a small hill in such a way that there was no darkness in that very small space of time, and a man could do whatever he wished as though the sun were there, even remove lice from his shirt, and if they had been on a mountain-top perhaps the sun would never have been hidden from them. In the middle of that moment of time it is midnight at the equator, and thus, on the contrary, I think that at the winter solstice and for a few days about it dawn appears only for the smallest space at Thule, when it is noon at the equator. Therefore those authors are wrong and give wrong information, who have written that the sea will be solid about Thule, and that day without night continues right through from the vernal to the autumnal equinox, and that vice versa night continues uninterrupted from the autumnal to the vernal equinox, since these men voyaged at the natural time of great cold, and entered the island and remaining on it had day and night alternately except for the period of the solstice. But one day's sail north of that they did find the sea frozen over. There are many other islands in the ocean to the north of Britain which can be reached from the northern islands of Britain in a direct voyage of two days and nights with sails filled with a continuously favourable wind. A devout priest told me that in two summer days and the intervening night he sailed in a two-benched boat and entered one of them. There is another set of small islands, nearly all separated by narrow stretches of water; in these for nearly a hundred years hermits sailing from our country, Ireland, have lived. But just as they were always deserted from the beginning of the world, so now because of the Northman pirates they are emptied of anchorites, and filled with countless sheep and very many diverse kinds of sea-birds. I have never found these islands mentioned in the authorities".

=== Modern research ===
A map of the world voyage done by Sir Francis Drake in 1577–1580 shows Thule (Tile/Tule) as what is likely modern Iceland near Greenland.

The British surveyor Charles Vallancey (1731–1812) was one of many antiquarians to argue that Ireland was Thule, as he does in his book An essay on the antiquity of the Irish language. Scottish historian W.F. Skene identified Thule as Kintyre peninsula in 1876 based upon a description given by Solinus.

Another hypothesis, first proposed by Lennart Meri in 1976, holds that the island of Saaremaa (which is often known by the exonym Ösel) in Estonia, could be Thule. That is, there is a phonological similarity between Thule and the root tule- "of fire" in Estonian (and other Finnic languages). A crater lake named Kaali on the island appears to have been formed by a meteor strike in prehistory. This meteor strike is often linked to Estonian folklore which has it that Saaremaa was a place where the sun at one point "went to rest".

Nazi Germany leadership considered Iceland to be the Thule area and the birthplace of the ancient Aryan race, with senior Nazi leader Heinrich Himmler even sending an expedition team to Iceland in 1938 with hopes of finding a temple for Nordic gods like Thor and Odin.

In 2010, scientists from the Institute of Geodesy and Geoinformation Science at Technische Universität Berlin claimed to have identified persistent errors in calculation that had occurred in attempts by modern geographers to superimpose geographic coordinate systems upon Ptolemaic maps. After correcting for these errors, the scientists claimed, Ptolemy's Thule could be mapped to the Norwegian island of Smøla.

== Namesakes ==
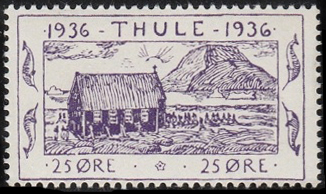
A local stamp of Greenland 1936, inscribed Thule

In 1775, during his second voyage, Captain Cook gave the name "Southern Thule" to an island in the high southern latitudes of the South Atlantic Ocean. The name is now used for the group of three southernmost islands in the South Sandwich Islands, one of which is called Thule Island. The island group became a British overseas territory of the United Kingdom, albeit also claimed by Argentina (in Spanish Islas Tule del Sur).

The Southern Thule islands were occupied by Argentina in 1976. The occupation was not militarily contested by the British until the 1982 Falklands War, when British sovereignty was restored by a contingent of Royal Marines. Currently the three islands are uninhabited.

In 1910, the explorer Knud Rasmussen established a missionary and trading post that he named Thule in North Star Bay in northwest Greenland. The Thule people, the predecessor of modern Inuit Greenlanders, were named after the Thule region. Thule Air Base, operated by the United States Air Force, was built at North Star Bay in 1953 and the Greenlandic residents of Thule were forced to resettle to New Thule (Qaanaaq), 110 kilometres (67 mi) to the north (76°31′50.21″N 68°42′36.13″W only 840 NM from the North Pole).

The Scottish Gaelic for Iceland is Innis Tile, which literally means the "Isle of Thule".

Thule lends its name to the 69th element in the periodic table, thulium.

Ultima Thule is the name of a location in the Mammoth Cave system in Kentucky, United States. It was formerly the terminus of the known-explorable southeastern (upstream) end of the passage called "Main Cave", before discoveries made in 1908 by Ed Bishop and Max Kaemper showed an area accessible beyond it, now the location of the Violet City Entrance. The Violet City Lantern tour offered at the cave passes through Ultima Thule near the conclusion of the route.

In March 2018, following a naming competition, the Kuiper belt object 486958 Arrokoth, a fly-by target of the NASA probe New Horizons, was nicknamed "Ultima Thule". The fly-by took place on 1 January 2019, and was the most distant encounter between a spacecraft and a planetary body. An official name for the body has since been assigned by the International Astronomical Union.

== Literary references ==
=== Classical literature ===
Pytheas' original description of Thule did not describe it as an island, as quoted by Strabo (2.5.8):

"It is true that Pytheas of Marseilles affirms that the farthest country north of the British islands is Thule; for which place he says the summer tropic and the arctic circle is all one. But he records no other particulars concerning it; [he does not say] whether Thule is an island, or whether it continues habitable up to the point where the summer tropic becomes one with the arctic circle. For myself, I fancy that the northern boundaries of the habitable earth are greatly south of this. Modern writers tell us of nothing beyond Ierne, which lies just north of Britain, where the people live miserably and like savages on account of the severity of the cold. It is here in my opinion the bounds of the habitable earth ought to be fixed."

In the metaphorical sense of a far-off land or an unattainable goal, Virgil coined the term Ultima Thule (Georgics, 1. 30) meaning "farthermost Thule".

Seneca the Younger writes of a day when new lands will be discovered past Thule. This was later quoted widely in the context of Christopher Columbus' voyages.

A work of prose fiction in Greek by Antonius Diogenes entitled The Wonders Beyond Thule appeared c. AD 150 or earlier. (Gerald N. Sandy, in the introduction to his translation of Photius' ninth century summary of the work, notes that this Thule most closely matches Iceland.)

The "known world' of the Europeans came to be viewed as bounded in the east by India and in the west by Thule, as expressed in the Consolation of Philosophy (III, 203 = metrus V, v. 7) by Boethius. "For though the earth, as far as India's shore, tremble before the laws you give, though Thule bow to your service on earth's farthest bounds, yet if thou canst not drive away black cares, if thou canst not put to flight complaints, then is no true power thine."

=== Medieval and early modern literature ===
By the Late Middle Ages, scholars were linking Iceland and/or Greenland to the name Thule and/or places reported by the Irish mariner Saint Brendan (in the 6th century) and other distant or mythical locations, such as Hy Brasil and Cockaigne. These scholars included works by Dicuil (see above), the Anglo-Saxon monk the Venerable Bede in De ratione temporum, the Landnámabók, by the anonymous Historia Norwegie, and by the German cleric Adam of Bremen in his Deeds of Bishops of the Hamburg Church, where they cite both ancient writers' use of Thule as well as new knowledge since the end of antiquity. All these authors also understood that other islands were situated to the north of Britain.

Eustathius of Thessalonica, in his twelfth-century commentary on the Iliad, wrote that the inhabitants of Thule were at war with a tribe whose members dwarf-like, only 20 fingers in height. The American classical scholar Charles Anthon believed this legend may have been rooted in history (although exaggerated), if the dwarf or pygmy tribe were interpreted as being a smaller aboriginal tribe of Britain which the people on Thule had encountered.

Petrarch, in the fourteenth century, wrote in his Epistolae familiares ("Familiar Letters") that Thule lay in the unknown regions of the far north-west.

A madrigal by Thomas Weelkes, entitled Thule (1600), describes it with reference to the Icelandic volcano Hekla:

Thule, the period of cosmography,
Doth vaunt of Hecla, whose sulphureous fire
Doth melt the frozen clime and thaw the sky;
Trinacrian Etna's flames ascend not higher ...

The English poet Ambrose Philips began, but did not complete, a poem concerning The Fable of Thule which he published in 1748.

Thule is referred to in Goethe's poem "Der König in Thule" (1774), which he reused later in Faust I. The King and Kingdom of Thule referenced in the poem have no historical basis, nor did Goethe claim such. Goethe's poem was famously set to music by Franz Schubert (D 367, 1816), Franz Liszt (S.531) and Robert Schumann (Op.67, No.1), and in the collection Ultima Thule (1880) by Henry Wadsworth Longfellow.

=== Modern literature ===
Edgar Allan Poe's poem "Dream-Land" (1844) begins with the following stanza:

By a route obscure and lonely,
Haunted by ill angels only,
Where an Eidolon, named Night,
On a black throne reigns upright.
I have reached these lands but newly
From an ultimate dim Thule –
From a wild weird clime, that lieth, sublime,
Out of Space – out of Time.

John Henry Wilbrandt Stuckenberg wrote on the subject in 1885:

What is the mind’s ultima Thule? What substance must be regarded as first, and therefore as the seed of the universe? What is the eternal Something, of which the temporal is but a manifestation? Matter? Spirit? Matter and Spirit? Something behind both and from which they have sprung, neither Matter nor Spirit, but their Creator? Or is there in reality neither Matter nor Spirit, but only an agnostic Cause of the phenomena erroneously assigned by us to body and mind?

After spending many years in profoundly investigating this problem, I have at last struck bottom. Unhesitatingly and unconditionally I adopt materialism, and declare it to be the sole and all-sufficient explanation of the universe. This affords the only thoroughly scientific system; and nowhere but in its legitimate conclusions can thought find suitable resting-place, the heart complete satisfaction, and life a perfect basis. Unless it accepts this system, philosophy will be but drift-wood, instead of the stream of thought whose current bears all truth. Materialism, thorough, consistent, and fearless, not the timid, reserved, and half-hearted kind, is the hope of the world.

— The Final Science: or Spiritual Materialism (1885) by John Henry Wilbrandt Stuckenberg (1835–1903), p. 6

Kelly Miller, addressing the Hampton Alumni Association in 1899, explained that

"Civilization may be defined as the sum total of those influences and agencies that make for knowledge and virtue. This is the goal, the ultima Thule, of all human strivings. The essential factors of civilization are knowledge, industry, culture, and virture."

Ultima Thule is the title of the 1929 novel by Henry Handel Richardson, set in colonial Australia.

Hal Foster's protagonist Prince Valiant gets his title from being the son of Aguar, exiled king of Thule who has taken refuge in the Fens during the days of King Arthur. Foster places this kingdom of Thule on the Norwegian mainland, near Trondheim.

"Ultima Thule" is a short story written by author Vladimir Nabokov and published in New Yorker magazine on April 7, 1973.

Ultima Thule is mentioned in The Name of the Rose by Umberto Eco in reference to an illuminated manuscript that the narrator/character Adso sees when he explores the library labyrinth alone at the end of the third day. "I opened a richly illuminated volume that, by its style, seemed to me to come from the monasteries of Ultima Thule."

Jorge Luis Borges uses the classic Latin phrase "ultima Thule" in his poem A Reader. He uses the phrase to connect the study of Latin in his younger years to his more recent efforts to read the Icelandic poet Snorri Sturluson.

Bernard Cornwell references Thule in his novel The Lords of the North, the third book in the series The Last Kingdom. The character Uhtred of Bebbanburg calls it, "that strange land of ice and flame".

Thule is mentioned in Asterix and the Chieftain's Daughter.

Cassandra Clare's The Shadowhunter Chronicles, features an alternate dimension called Thule.

Thule is the name of an artificial polar island in Sue Burke's sci-fi novel Dual Memory.

Thule is a mild deity oath from Christopher Paolini's sci-fi novel, To Sleep in a Sea of Stars. In Appendix III of his book, Paolini explains that Thule became known as the god of the spacers or "the Lord of Empty Spaces", and is derived from ultima Thule.

== In Nazi ideology ==
Some followers of ariosophy in early 20th-century Germany hypothesized a historical Thule, or Hyperborea, as the ancient origin of the "Aryan race" (a term which they believed had been used by the hypothetical Proto-Indo-European people). The Thule Society (Thule Gesellschaft), which had close links to the Deutsche Arbeiterpartei (DAP), the precursor organization to the Nationalsozialistische Deutsche Arbeiterpartei (NSDAP), was, according to its own account, founded on August 18, 1918.

In his biography of Lanz von Liebenfels (1874–1954), Der Mann, der Hitler die Ideen gab (published in Munich, 1985; translated as The Man who Gave Hitler the Ideas), the Viennese psychologist and author Wilfried Daim wrote that the Thule Gesellschaft name originated from mythical Thule. In his history of the SA (Mit ruhig festem Schritt, 1998 – With Firm and Steady Step), Wilfred von Oven, Joseph Goebbels' press adjutant from 1943 to 1945, confirmed that Pytheas' Thule was the historical Thule for the Thule Gesellschaft.

Much of this interest in Thule was initially due to rumours surrounding the Oera Linda Book, claimed to have been found by Cornelis over de Linden in the 19th century. The Oera Linda Book was partially translated into German in 1933 by Herman Wirth and was favoured by Heinrich Himmler. The book has since been discredited. Professor of Frisian Language and Literature Goffe Jensma wrote that the three authors of the translation intended it "to be a temporary hoax to fool some nationalist Frisians and orthodox Christians and as an experiential exemplary exercise in reading the Holy Bible in a non-fundamentalist, symbolical way".

== See also ==
- Hyperborea
- Mythical place
- Phantom island
- Southern Thule
- Thule people
- Thule Society

== Bibliography ==
- Burton, Richard F. (1875). Ultima Thule: Or, A Summer in Iceland. London, Edinburgh: W.P. Nimmo. Downloadable Google Books.
- Fotheringham, W.H. (1862). "On the Thule of the Ancients" (PDF). Proceedings of the Society of Antiquaries of Scotland. III: 491–503.
- Gilberg, Rolf (June 1976). "Thule" (PDF). Arctic. 29 (2): 83–86. doi:10.14430/arctic2793. Archived from the original (pfd) on 24 May 2011.
- Joanna Kavenna, The Ice Museum: In Search of the Lost Land of Thule, London, Penguin, 2006. ISBN 978-0-14-101198-1
- Pliny (1829). Histoire naturelle de Pline: Traduction Nouvelle: Vol III (in French). Ajasson de Grandsagne (trans.). Paris: C.L.F. Panckoucke. pp. 337–338, notes on Book IV.
- Pliny (1893). The Natural History of Pliny: Volume I. Translated by John Bostock; Henry Thomas Riley. London, New York: George Bell & Sons. pp. 352, notes on Book IV.
- Chisholm, Hugh, ed. (1911). "Thule" . Encyclopædia Britannica (11th ed.). Cambridge University Press.
