= Zinna Abbey =

Former monastery in Jüterbog

Coordinates: 52°01′N 13°06′E

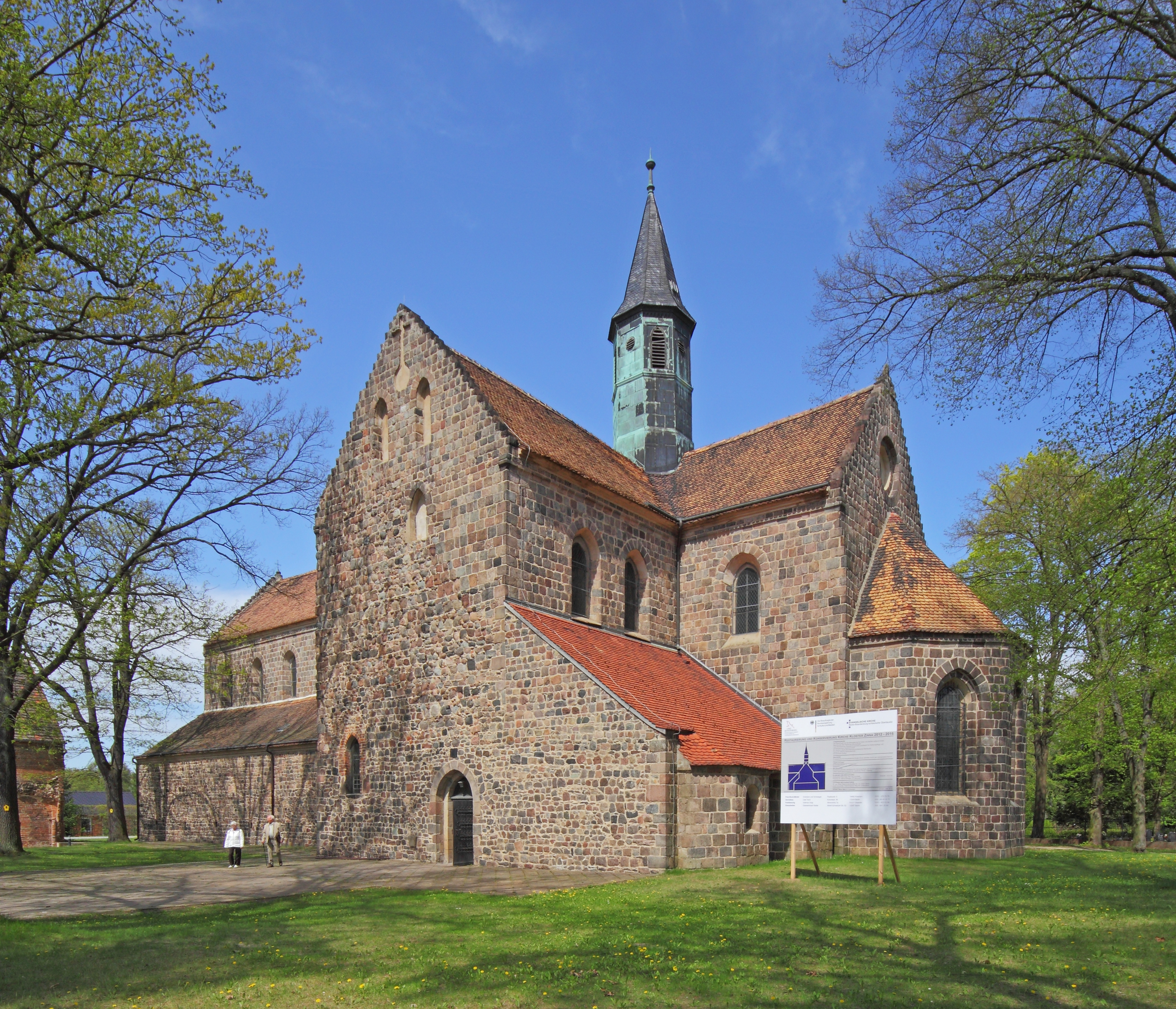
Zinna Abbey church

Zinna Abbey (German: Kloster Zinna) is a former Cistercian monastery, the site of which is now occupied by a village also called Kloster Zinna, today part of Jüterbog in Brandenburg, Germany, about 60 km (37 mi) south of Berlin. The village was established by Frederick II of Prussia as a village for weavers.

== Cistercians ==
The abbey was founded in about 1170 by Wichmann von Seeburg, the Archbishop of Magdeburg, after his troops had conquered the former Slavic territory. It possibly was meant for preventing the territorial expansion southwards of the Ascanian lords of nearby Luckenwalde, descendants of Albert the Bear. The monastery was built on the northern rim of the Fläming hill range in the marshes of the Nuthe river by Cistercian monks, descending from the monastery on the site of Burg Berge, otherwise Altenberg Abbey, in the County of Berg near Cologne. With huge effort they drained the land and turned it into productive ground.

The abbey soon assumed immense economic significance throughout the whole region. In 1285 it bought the town of Luckenwalde and eleven surrounding villages. At its high point, in 1307, the abbey territory measured almost 300 km^{2}. For more distant trade the abbey kept town properties in Berlin, Wittenberg and Jüterbog, among others: the present Jüterbog Town Museum is in the former townhouse of the Abbot of Zinna. The monks left a famous psalter, the psalterium novum beatae Mariae, printed in the 1490s, today on display at the Brandenburg State Library in Potsdam.

The area however remained a remote eastern exclave of the Magdeburg archdiocese, pressed by the neighbouring Margraves of Brandenburg and the Dukes of Saxe-Wittenberg. After a lengthy period of decline, monastic life in the abbey came to an end in 1553 with the Protestant Reformation.

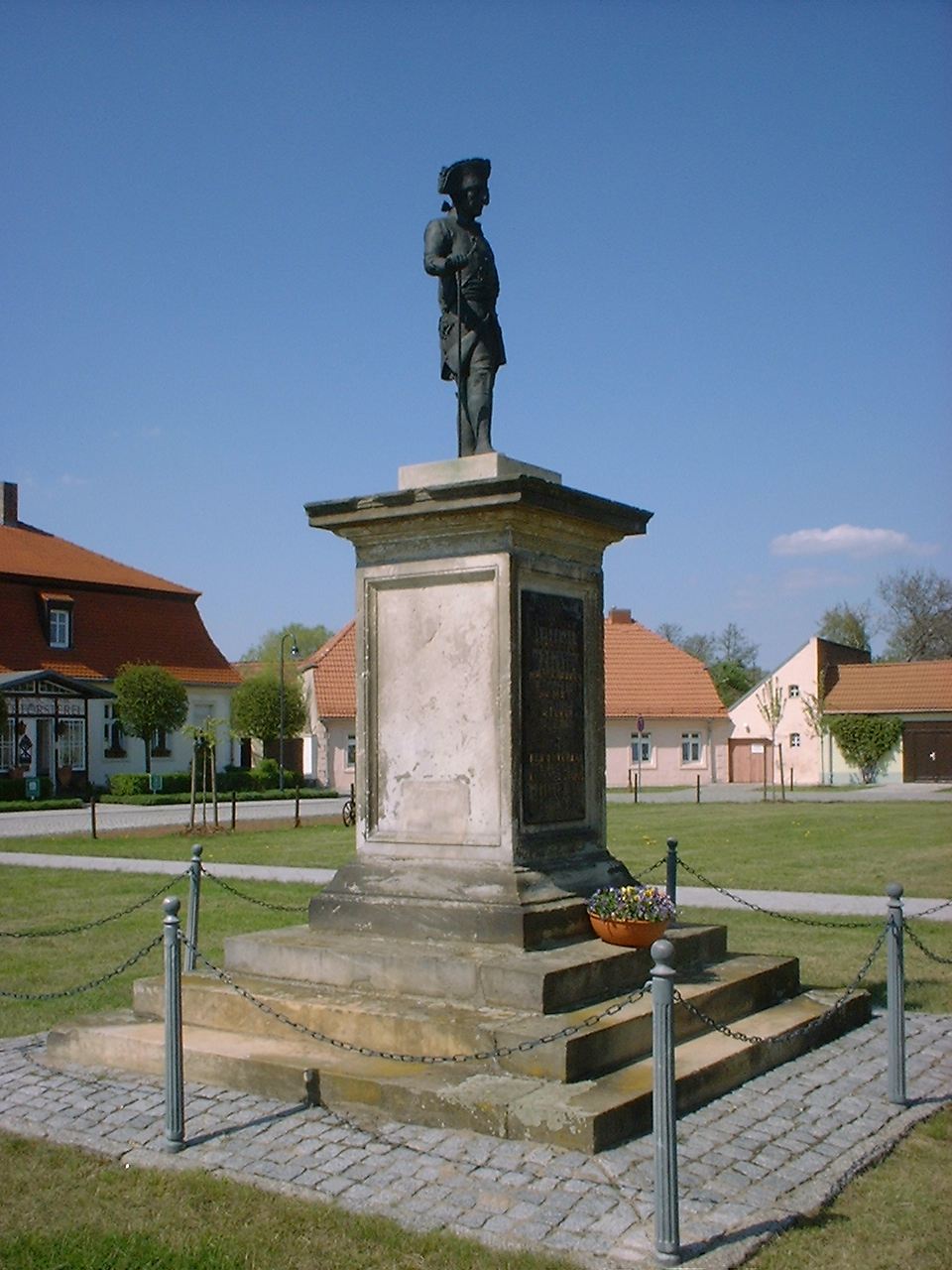
Statue of Frederick II

== Frederick II ==
Following the Peace of Westphalia, the Magdeburg territories had finally been secularized in 1680 as the Duchy of Magdeburg and been given to Brandenburg-Prussia. In 1764, in an effort to bring economic revival to the area, King Frederick II of Prussia established a new village for weavers descending from Upper Lusatia at the site on which some of the monastic buildings had remained.

The new settlement since 1902 has been called Kloster Zinna after the abbey and in 1992 was incorporated into the town of Jüterbog. The success of the economic efforts was quite modest, but there is still a statue to Frederick II erected in celebration of the centenary jubilee in 1864 and re-erected in 1994.

== Buildings ==
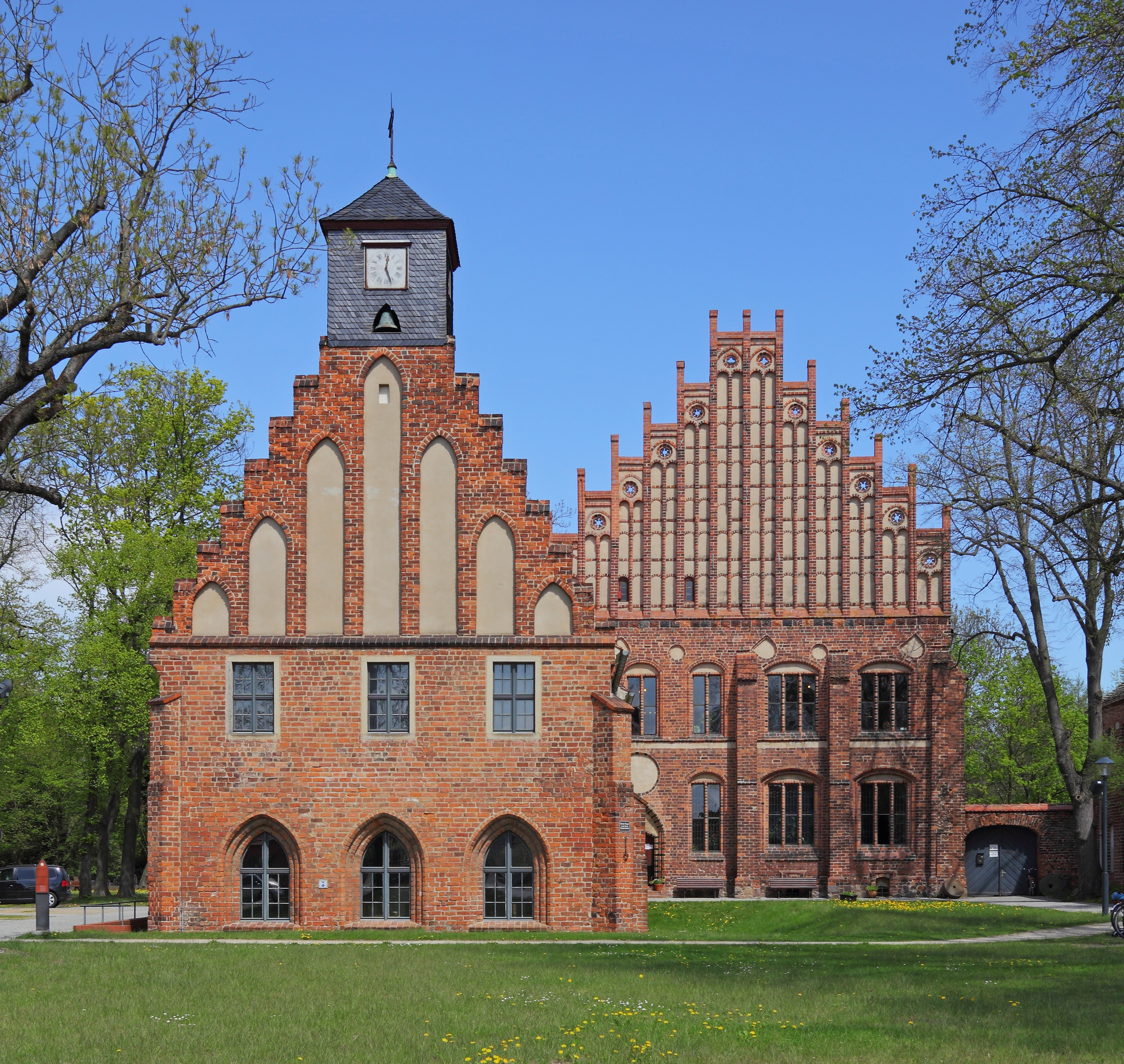
Old and New Abbey

Of the monastic complex there still remain the abbey church, the brewhouse and the customs house, as well as some fragments of the cloisters and the guesthouse. Of the former pilgrimage site on the nearby Golmberg, however, there remains only a cross.

The plain abbey church is an early Gothic pillared basilica with a cruciform groundplan. In the late Gothic period vaulting was introduced into most parts of the structure. Of especial musical interest is the organ by Wilhelm Baer, dating from 1850/51, which on guided tours it is possible to walk through.

Before the altar, there is an Ave Maria inscription embedded in the floor which consists of individual letter tiles. Each letter appears as a relief print on an unglazed, red-brown terracotta tile measuring 14 x 14 cm. The Latin inscription dates to the 13th or 14th century and was composed in Gothic majuscule. The technique is considered a precursor of movable type printing.

In the building known as the "New Abbey" is the local museum, with medieval frescoes and a model of the original monastery complex as it would have been in 1170, as well as displays relating to the abbey's history up to c. 1550 and the development of the weavers' colony. In the old customs house there are displays of traditional weaving techniques and live demonstrations. In the old brewhouse the sweet herbal liqueur "Klosterbruder" is still produced, in which process the visitor is encouraged to participate.

The buildings and the picturesque landscape are also used in spring and summer as the background for concerts, and in co-operation with Lehnin Abbey the medieval music events of the Musica Mediaevalis concert series. There is also a traditional New Year's concert by candlelight in the church - at natural temperature.

== See also ==
- Treaty of Zinna
- Forst Zinna rail disaster

== Sources ==
- Brekle, Herbert E. (1997), "Das typographische Prinzip. Versuch einer Begriffsklärung", Gutenberg-Jahrbuch, 72: 58–63 (61f.)
- Klamt, Christian (2004), "Letters van baksteen in een cistercienzerklooster: het Ave Maria te Zinna", in Stuip, R. E. V. (ed.), Meer dan muziek alleen: in memoriam Kees Vellekoop, Utrechtse bijdragen tot de mediëvistiek, vol. 20, Hilversum: Uitgeverij Verloren, pp. 195–210, ISBN 90-6550-776-0
