= Jüterbog =

- Town
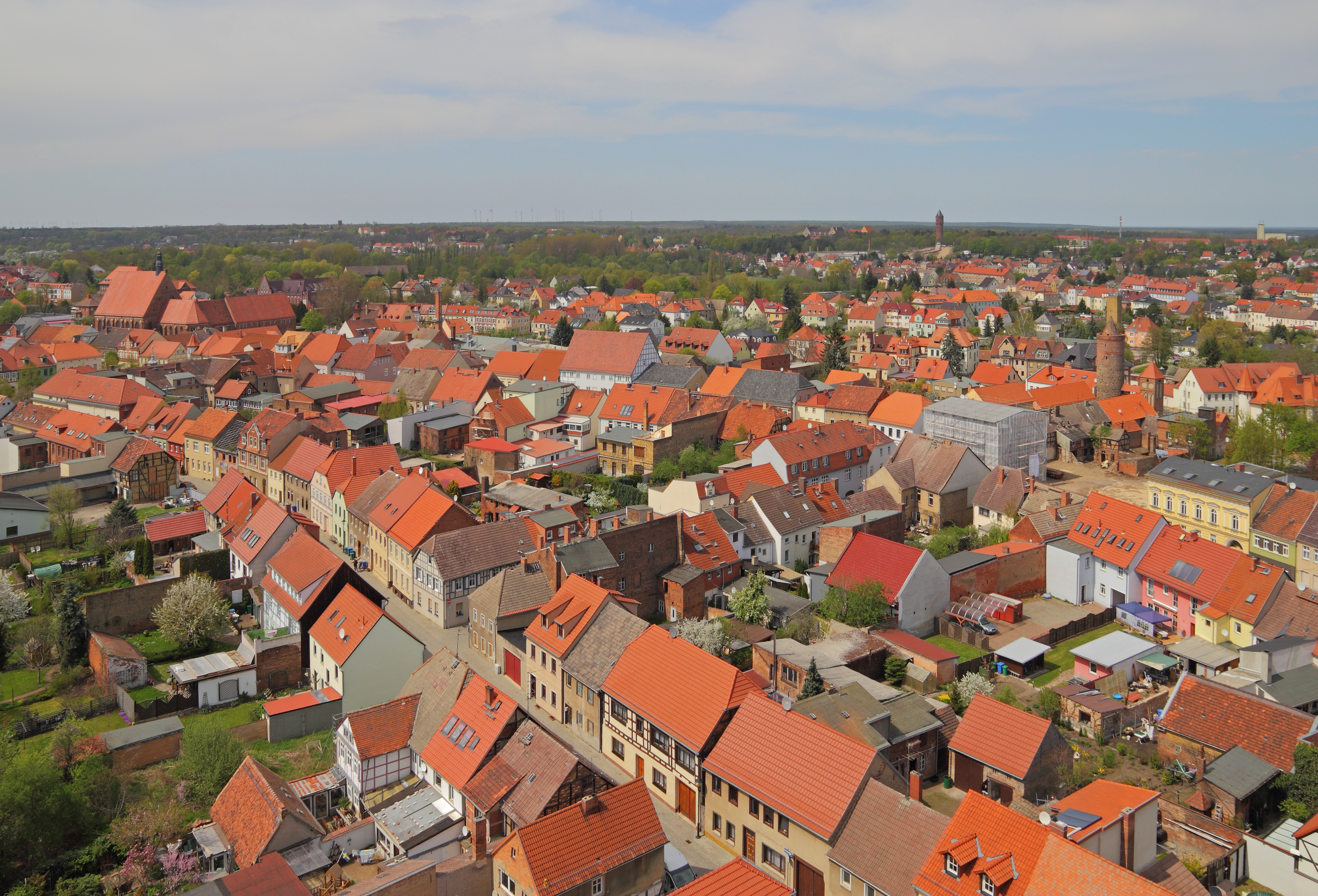
- View of the village from St. Nicholas church

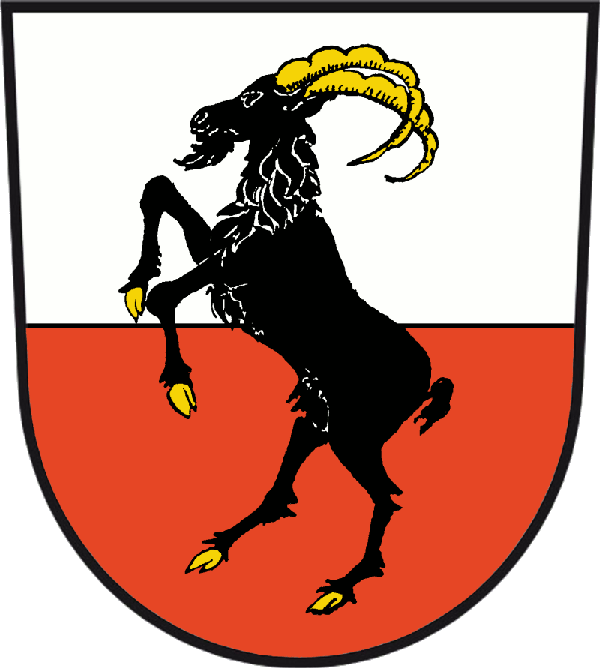
- Coat of arms

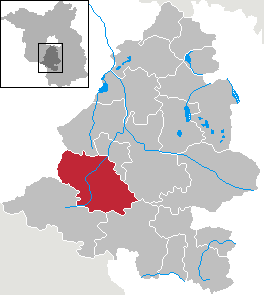
- Location of Jüterbog within Teltow-Fläming district
- Interactive map of Jüterbog
- Location within Germany Location within Brandenburg
- Coordinates: 51°59′36″N 13°04′22″E
- Country: Germany
- State: Brandenburg
- District: Teltow-Fläming

Government
  - Mayor (2025–33): Christiane Lindner-Klopsch (Ind.)

Area
  - Total: 176.48 km^{2} (68.14 sq mi)
- Elevation: 71 m (233 ft)

Population (2025-12-31)
  - Total: 12,961
  - Density: 73.442/km^{2} (190.21/sq mi)
- Time zone: UTC+01:00 (CET)
  - Summer (DST): UTC+02:00 (CEST)
- Postal codes: 14913
- Dialling codes: 03372
- Vehicle registration: TF, JB
- Website: www.jueterbog.eu

Jüterbog (German pronunciation: [ˈjyːtɐˌbɔk]) is a historic town in north-eastern Germany, in the Teltow-Fläming district of Brandenburg. It is on the Nuthe river at the northern slope of the Fläming hill range, about 65 km (40 mi) southwest of Berlin.

== History ==
The Slavic settlement of Jutriboc in the Saxon Eastern March was first mentioned in 1007 by Thietmar of Merseburg, chronicler of Archbishop Tagino of Magdeburg. However, it was not incorporated into the Magdeburg diocese until 1157, when Archbishop Wichmann von Seeburg in the train of Albert the Bear established a burgward here. In 1170 Wichmann also founded the neighbouring Zinna Abbey and granted Jüterbog town privileges in 1174. The area remained a Magdeburg exclave between the Duchy of Saxe-Wittenberg and the Margraviate of Brandenburg throughout the Middle Ages.

In March 1611 a treaty was signed in Jüterbog between Brandenburg and the Electorate of Saxony in a failed attempt to end the War of the Jülich succession. In November 1644, during the Thirty Years' War, Swedish troops defeated an Imperial army nearby. While the Magdeburg Archbishopric was promised to Brandenburg-Prussia by the 1648 Peace of Westphalia, the town of Jüterbog passed to Saxony.

The Battle of Dennewitz occurred two miles (3 km) southwest of Jüterbog on 6 September 1813 during the Napoleonic Wars. The Final Act of the 1815 Congress of Vienna finally adjudicated the town to the Kingdom of Prussia, it was subsequently administered within the Province of Brandenburg and became a garrison town of the Prussian Army. In 1871 it became part of the German Empire during the unification of Germany.

Under Nazi rule, Jüterbog's army base was greatly expanded and three surrounding villages were razed to make space for training areas. During the partition of Germany from 1945 to 1990, Jüterbog was part of East Germany and remained an important garrison town, but then for the Red Army. Up to 40,000 Soviet soldiers were garrisoned in imposing Nazi-era barracks and in new buildings in the countryside. Forces garrisoned in the town included the 32nd Guards Tank Division and the 387th Guards Artillery Brigade. The huge garrison, about four times larger than the civilian population, strongly disrupted civilian life and the town was occasionally shelled as a result of indiscriminate Soviet artillery training. After the Red Army left reunified Germany in 1990, the 20,000 hectares (77 sq mi) military area was and remains closed to the public because of security and environmental hazards.

== Demography ==
Development of Population since 1875 within the Current Boundaries (Blue Line: Population; Dotted Line: Comparison to Population Development of Brandenburg state; Grey Background: Time of Nazi rule; Red Background: Time of Communist rule)

Recent Population Development and Projections (Population Development before Census 2011 (blue line); Recent Population Development according to the Census in Germany in 2011 (blue bordered line); Official projections for 2005-2030 (yellow line); for 2017-2030 (scarlet line); for 2020-2030 (green line)

Jüterbog: Population development
within the current boundaries (2020)

Year	Pop.	±% p.a.
1875	11,989	—
1890	12,955	+0.52%
1910	14,104	+0.43%
1925	16,694	+1.13%
1939	20,538	+1.49%
1950	20,923	+0.17%
1964	17,855	−1.13%

Year	Pop.	±% p.a.
1971	17,389	−0.38%
1981	15,880	−0.90%
1985	15,483	−0.63%
1990	15,065	−0.55%
1995	14,139	−1.26%
2000	13,875	−0.38%
2005	13,141	−1.08%

Year	Pop.	±% p.a.
2010	12,668	−0.73%
2015	12,314	−0.57%
2016	12,308	−0.05%
2017	12,393	+0.69%
2018	12,311	−0.66%
2019	12,372	+0.50%
2020	12,423	+0.41%

== Sights ==
The town is surrounded by a medieval wall including three well preserved city gates with barbicans.

The St. Nikolai church is the largest medieval church in Jüterbog. The nave is a Brick Gothic hall church construction with fieldstone dual towers that dominate the cityscape. The church contains a rare surviving indulgences coffer by Johann Tetzel. These practices were observed by Martin Luther in nearby Wittenberg, who published his response in his Ninety-five Theses.

There are also a medieval Roman Catholic church and the old Brick Gothic city hall with a statue of Saint Maurice from the 16th century, and a modern school. Jüterbog carries on weaving and spinning both of flax and wool, and trades in the produce of those manufactures and in cattle. Vines are cultivated in the neighbourhood.

Zinna Abbey, the Cistercian monastery founded in 1170, is about 3 km (1.9 mi) north of the city.

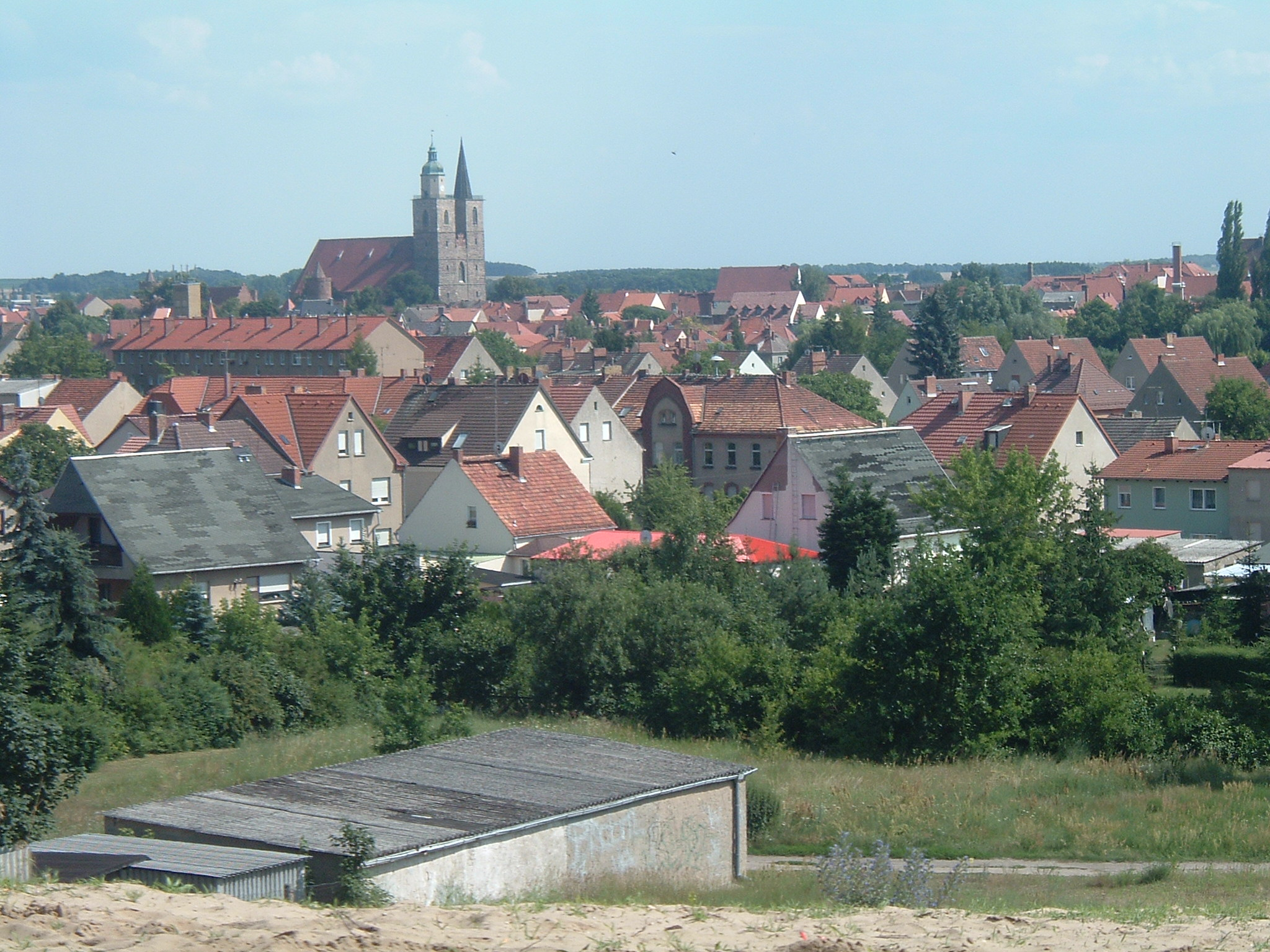
St Nikolai church towering over the old city

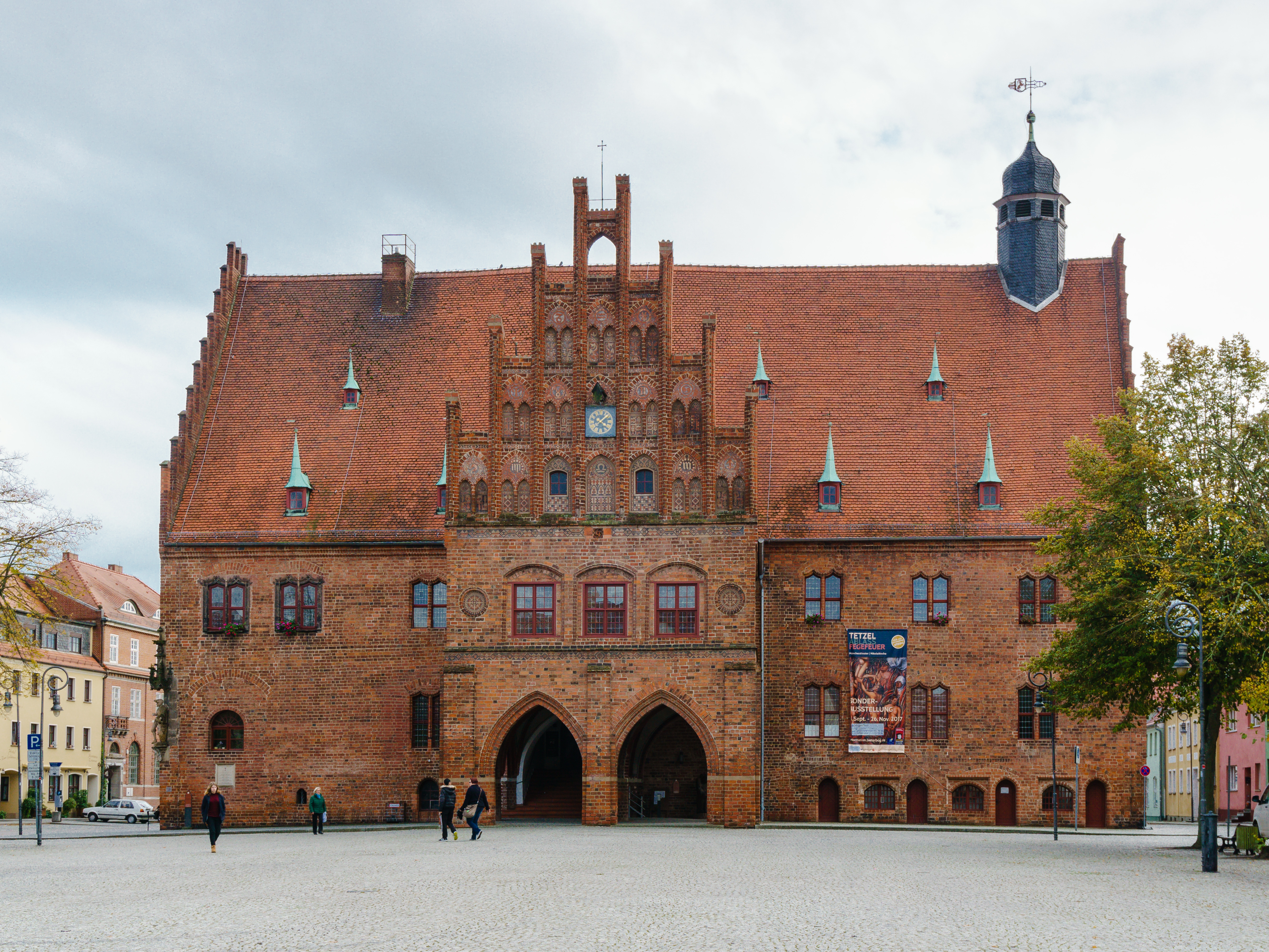
Medieval city hall

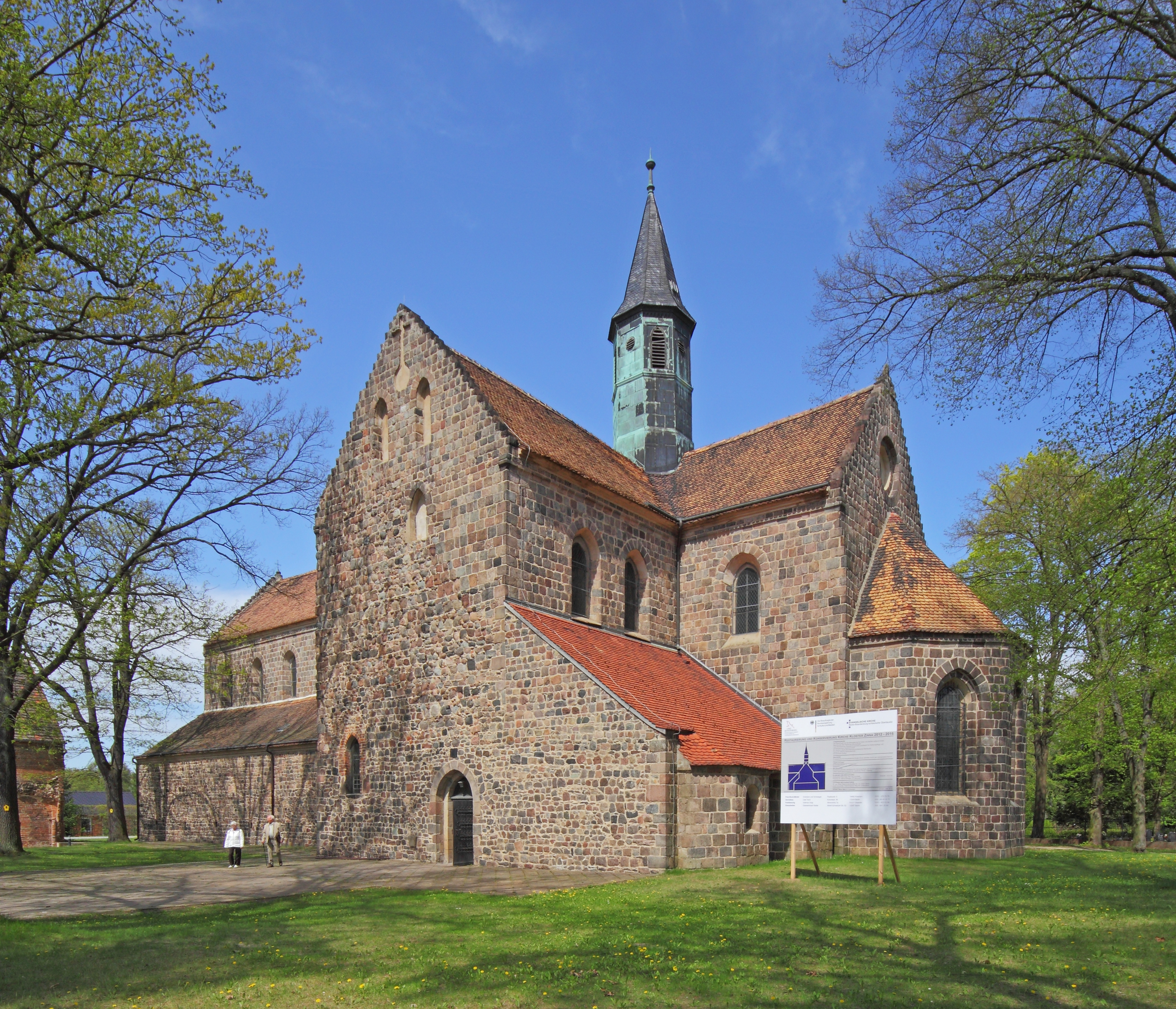
Church of Zinna Abbey

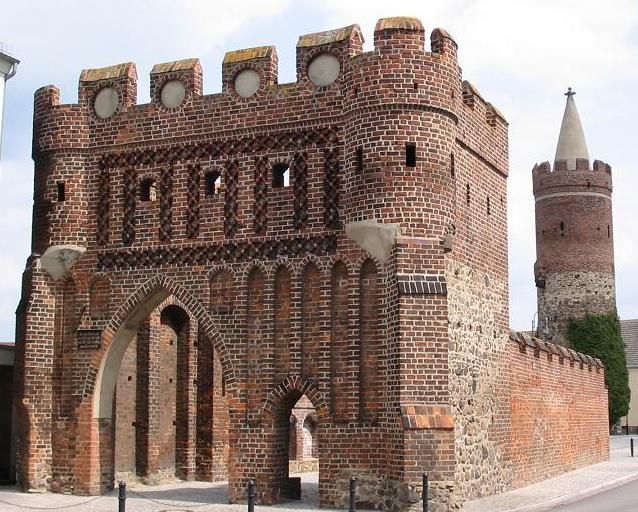
Dammtor city gate (an ornate barbican)

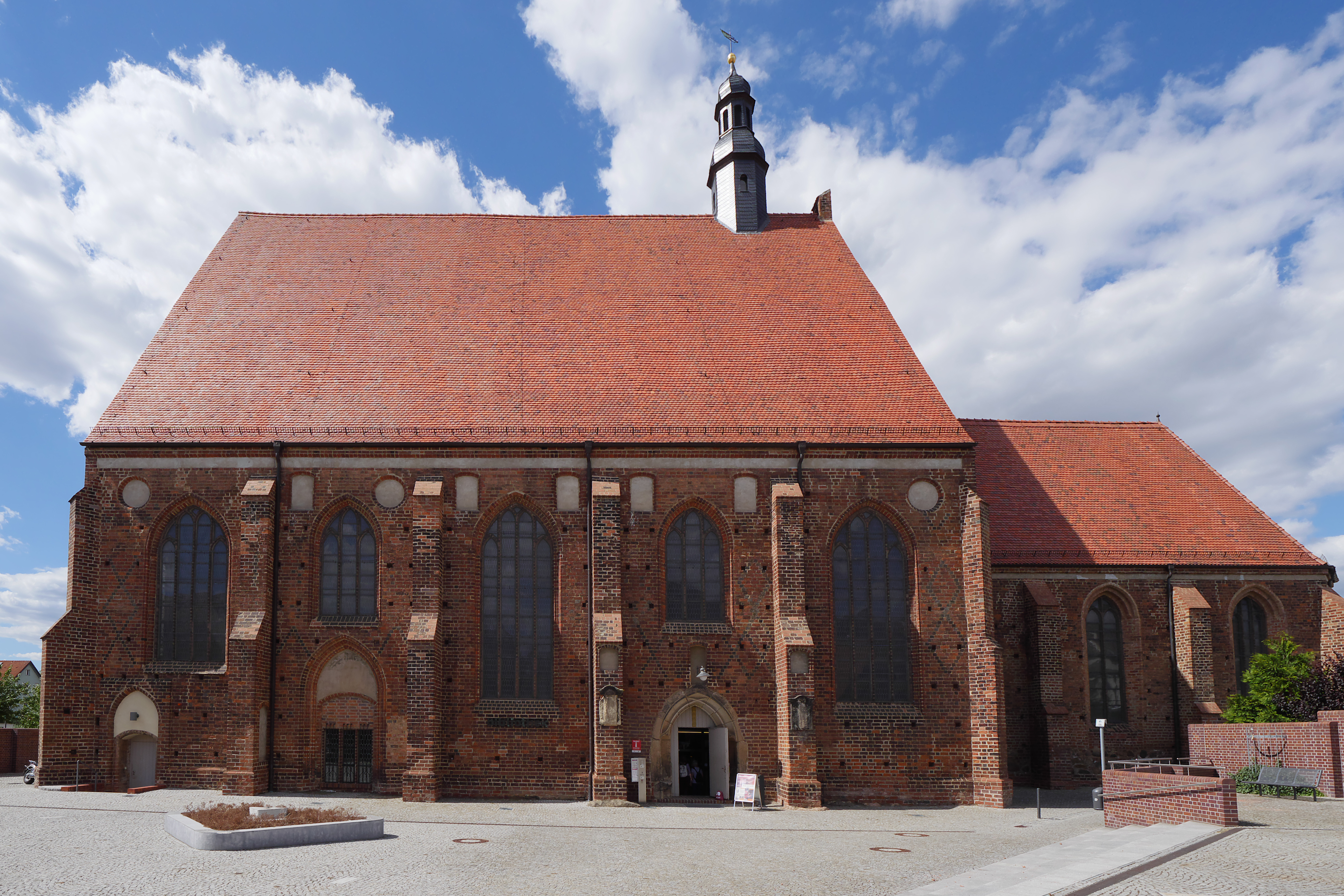
Mönchenkirche
or Monks' church

== Politics ==
Seats in the municipal assembly (Stadtverordnetenversammlung) as of 2024 elections:

- Social Democratic Party of Germany (SPD): 3
- Alternative for Germany (AfD): 3
- Bauernverband (farmers' union): 3
- Bürgerbündnis Jüterbog: 3
- Jüterbog und Ortsteile Wählergruppe: 3
- The Left: 2
- Für Jüterbog Wählergruppe: 2
- Christian Democratic Union (CDU): 1

== Transport ==
In 1841 Jüterbog station received access to the Berlin-Anhalt Railway line. Today the station is located at the junction of the railway line from Berlin to Wittenberg and a branch-off to Falkenberg/Elster, all served by Regional-Express trains of the Deutsche Bahn company. A third railway connection to Beelitz and Berlin-Wannsee is provided by the private Veolia Verkehr company. The Forst Zinna rail disaster occurred 19 January 1988.

Furthermore, Jüterbog can be reached via Bundesstraße 101 from Berlin and the Berliner Ring motorway as well as via Bundesstraße 102 from the Bundesautobahn 9 at Niemegk junction.

Three airfields are in the vicinity of Jüterbog: the Jüterbog Airfield few km to the west, the Oehna Airfield 10 km to the south, and the Reinsdorf Airfield 15 km south-east of Jüterbog.

== Notable people ==
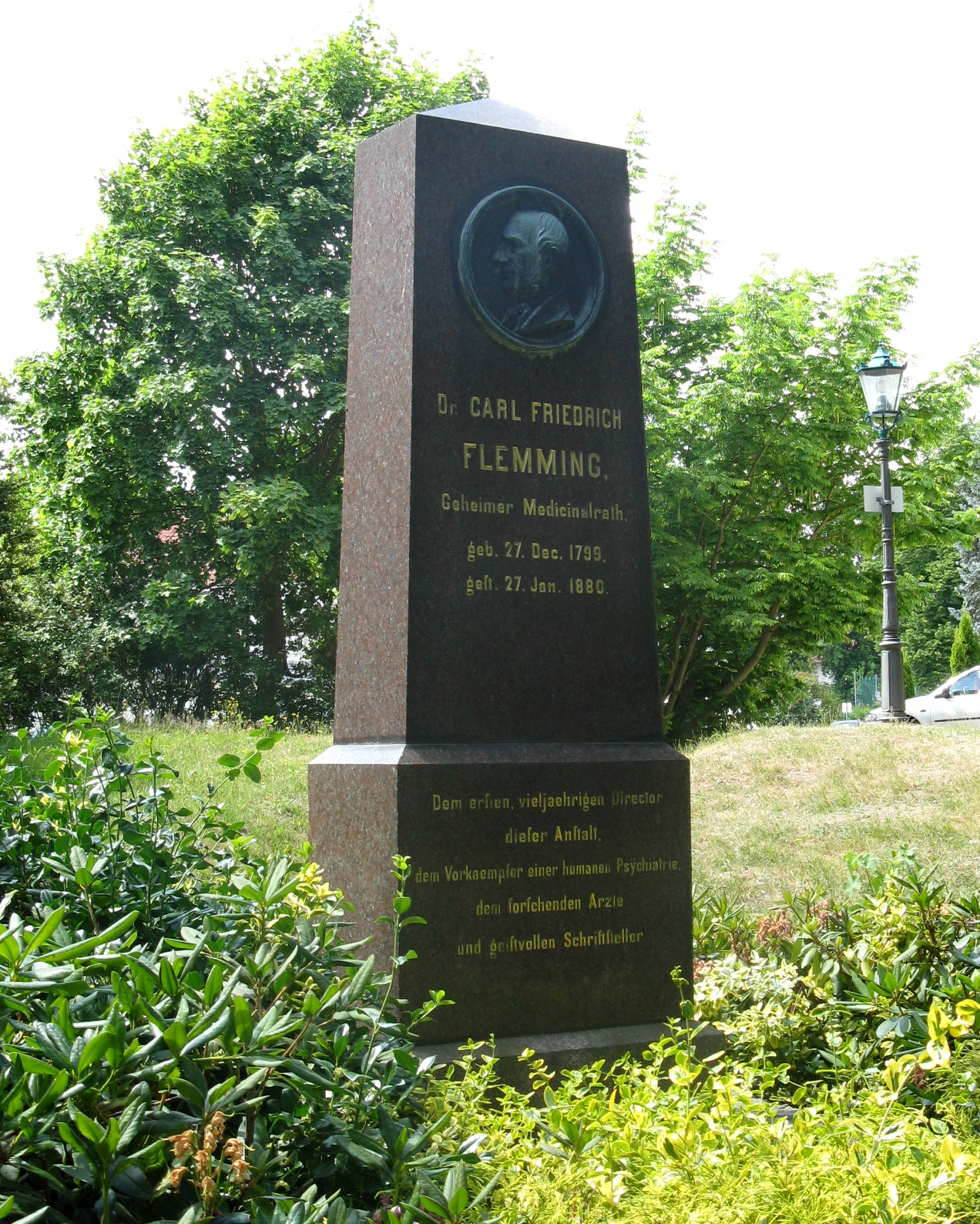
Schwerin Flemming-memorial

- Jacob of Juterbogk (1381–1465), theologian
- Johann Deutschmann (1625–1706), theologian
- Johann Friedrich von Brandt (1802–1879), naturalist
- Hans Peter Hallwachs (1938–2022), actor
- Friedrich Gottlob Hayne (1763–1832), botanist
- Carl Friedrich Flemming (1799–1880), psychiatrist
- Max Kämper (1879–1916), mining engineer
- Wilhelm Kempff (1895–1991), pianist and composer
- Ida von Boxberg (1806–1893), archaeologist
- Ulrich Wegener (1929–2017), police officer, first commander of the GSG 9

== Twin towns ==
Jüterbog is twinned with:

- (Germany) Aßlar, Hesse
- (Germany) Waldbröl, North Rhine-Westphalia
