= Stephen Bishop (cave explorer) =

American cave explorer

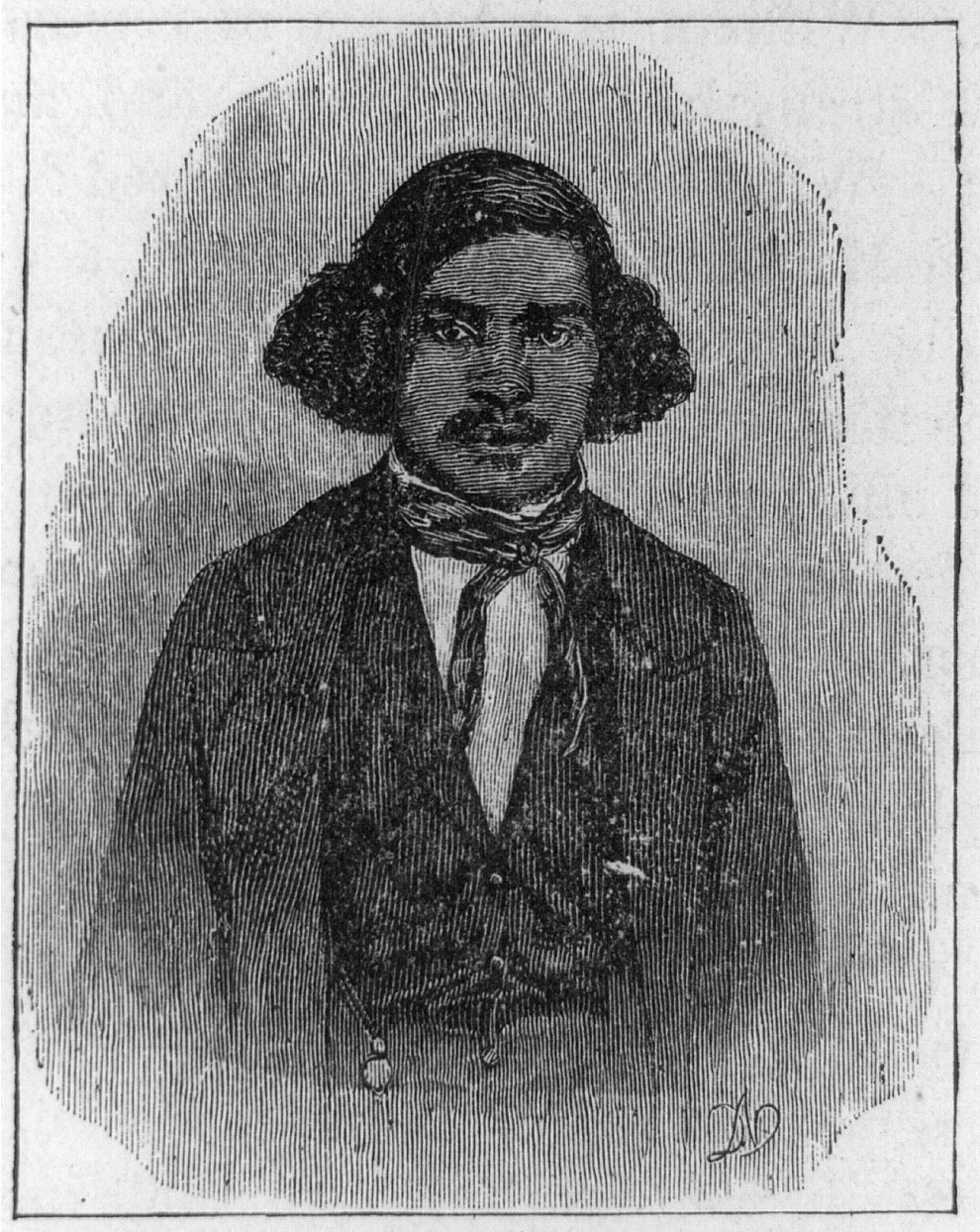
- Drawing of Stephen Bishop (published in 1880s, not from life)
- Born: c. 1821
- Died: 1857 (aged 35–36)
- Known for: Exploration and mapping of Mammoth Cave

Stephen Bishop (c. 1821 – 1857) was an American cave explorer and self-taught geologist known for being one of the first people to explore and map Mammoth Cave in the U.S. state of Kentucky. Mammoth Cave has been recognized as the longest cave system in the world since 1972. Bishop's map of the cave, hand-drawn from memory off-site in 1842, was included in a book published in 1844 and was regarded as the authoritative map of the cave system for over four decades. Bishop was enslaved and worked as a guide at Mammoth for approximately 19 years. He was freed by manumission the year before his death.

== Background ==
Bishop was taken to Mammoth Cave in 1838 when he was 17 years old, by lawyer and owner Franklin Gorin, who had acquired ownership of Bishop as repayment for a debt stemming from the divorce of Bishop's possible father, white farmer Lowry Bishop. Gorin had purchased Mammoth Cave from its previous owners in the spring of 1838 for $5000 (~$145,231 in 2024). Gorin wrote as he reminisced after Bishop's death:

"I placed a guide in the cave – the celebrated and great Stephen, and he aided in making the discoveries. Stephen was a self-educated man; a fine genius, a great fund of wit & humor, some little knowledge of Latin and Greek, and much knowledge of geology, but his great talent was a perfect knowledge of man."

== Mammoth Cave career ==
Bishop explored and named large areas of the Mammoth Cave system. He discovered and named many features of the Cave – including River Styx, Great Relief Hall, Fat Man's Misery, Tall Man's Misery, and Lake Lethe. Numerous authors wrote about their Mammoth Cave tours with Bishop as their guide in books and magazines. Robert Barnwell Roosevelt, writing in The Knickerbocker, as "Barnwell" refers to Bishop as "Stephen, the best guide to the cave". Roosevelt states that Bishop told the group that he, Bishop, had learned to read and write by seeing previous tourists "...the gentlemen paint their names with the smoke of the torches on the walls, and then asking how they spelled them." Later, in 1854, Nathaniel Parker Willis, in A Health Trip to the Tropics, described Bishop as wearing "a chocolate-colored slouch hat, a green jacket, and striped trousers" as his working uniform.

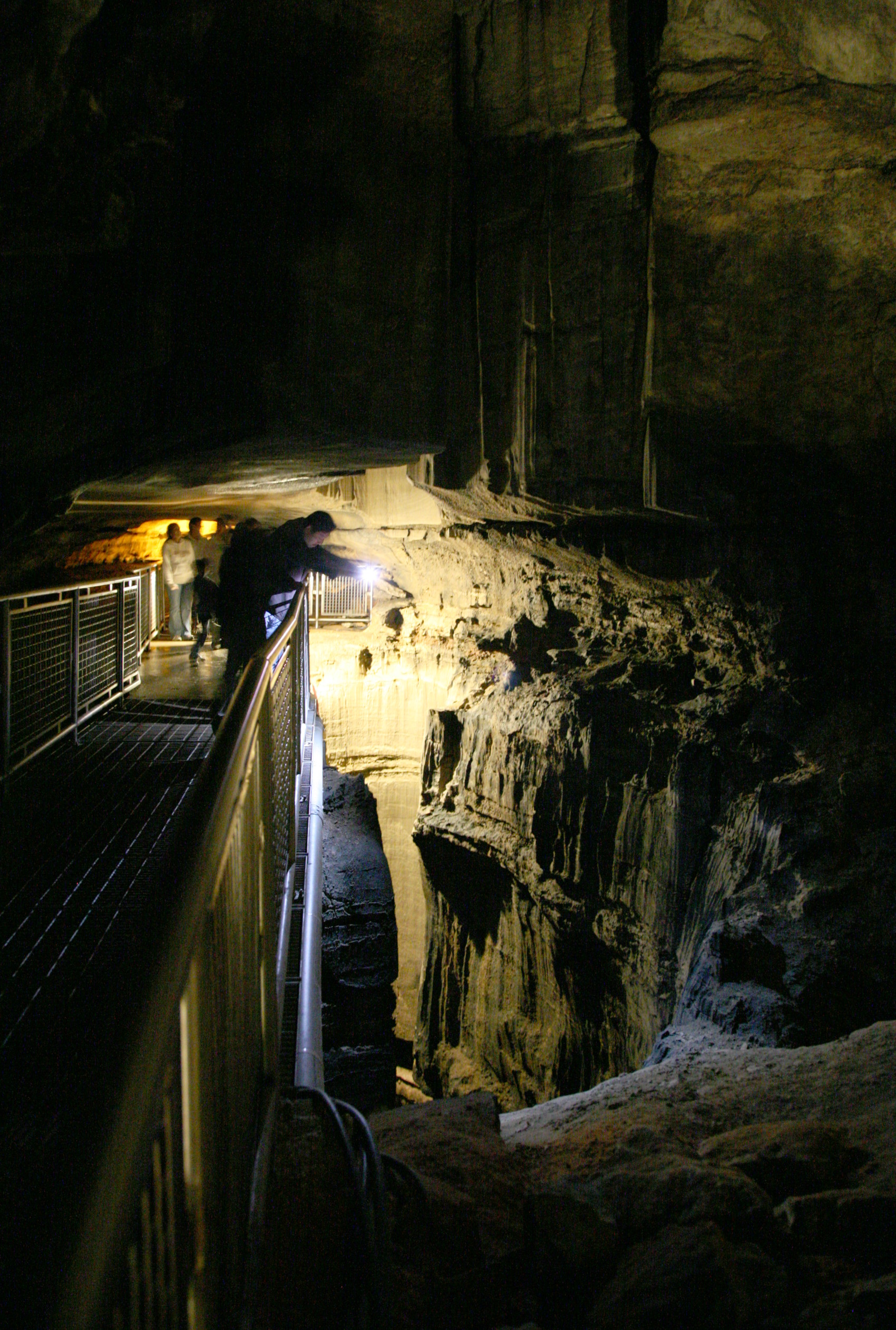
The Bottomless Pit at Mammoth Cave

Willis also described Bishop as "better worth looking at than most celebrities...With more of the physiognomy of a Spaniard, with masses of black hair, curling slightly and gracefully, and his long mustache, giving quite an appearance. He is of middle size, but built for an athlete. With broad chest and shoulders, narrow hips and legs slightly bowed. Mammoth Cave is a wonder in which draws good society and Stephen shows that he is used to it." Bishop led tours through Mammoth that included such well-known 19th century figures as opera-singer Jenny Lind, essayist Ralph Waldo Emerson, Yale professor Benjamin Silliman Jr., and the violin virtuoso Ole Bull.

Before Bishop, the farthest anyone had been in the cave was to the feature known as "The Bottomless Pit". Along with a guest named H.C. Stevenson, (who allegedly offered Bishop a "fistful of money" to explore the unknown parts of the Cave) Bishop journeyed to the edge of the Pit. Though later tales said it was a cedar sapling, more reliable sources state it was a tall ladder or series of ladders laid across the mouth of the Pit that enabled Bishop and his guest to venture across to the other side, opening up a whole new part of the cave. Bishop is also said to have discovered eyeless fish, probably specimens of Amblyopsis spelaea or the Northern cavefish.

== Bishop's 1842 map of Mammoth Cave ==
In 1839, Dr. John Croghan of Louisville bought the Mammoth Cave Estate from its owner Franklin Gorin for $10,000 (equivalent to $302,344 in 2025). This sale included Bishop and several other enslaved people. Croghan briefly ran an ill-fated tuberculosis hospital in the cave, the vapors of which he believed would cure his patients. A widespread epidemic disease of the period, tuberculosis would ultimately claim the life of Croghan.

In 1842, Bishop was sent to Croghan's plantation, Locust Grove. He stayed there for two weeks, drawing a map of the Mammoth Cave system from memory. The map was published in 1844 by Morton and Griswold as a pull-out insert in Alexander Clark Bullitt's Rambles in Mammoth Cave in the Year 1844 by a Visiter [sic] (Morton and Griswold, 1845.) Unusually for an enslaved person, Bishop was given full credit for his work. The Bishop map remained in use for over forty years.

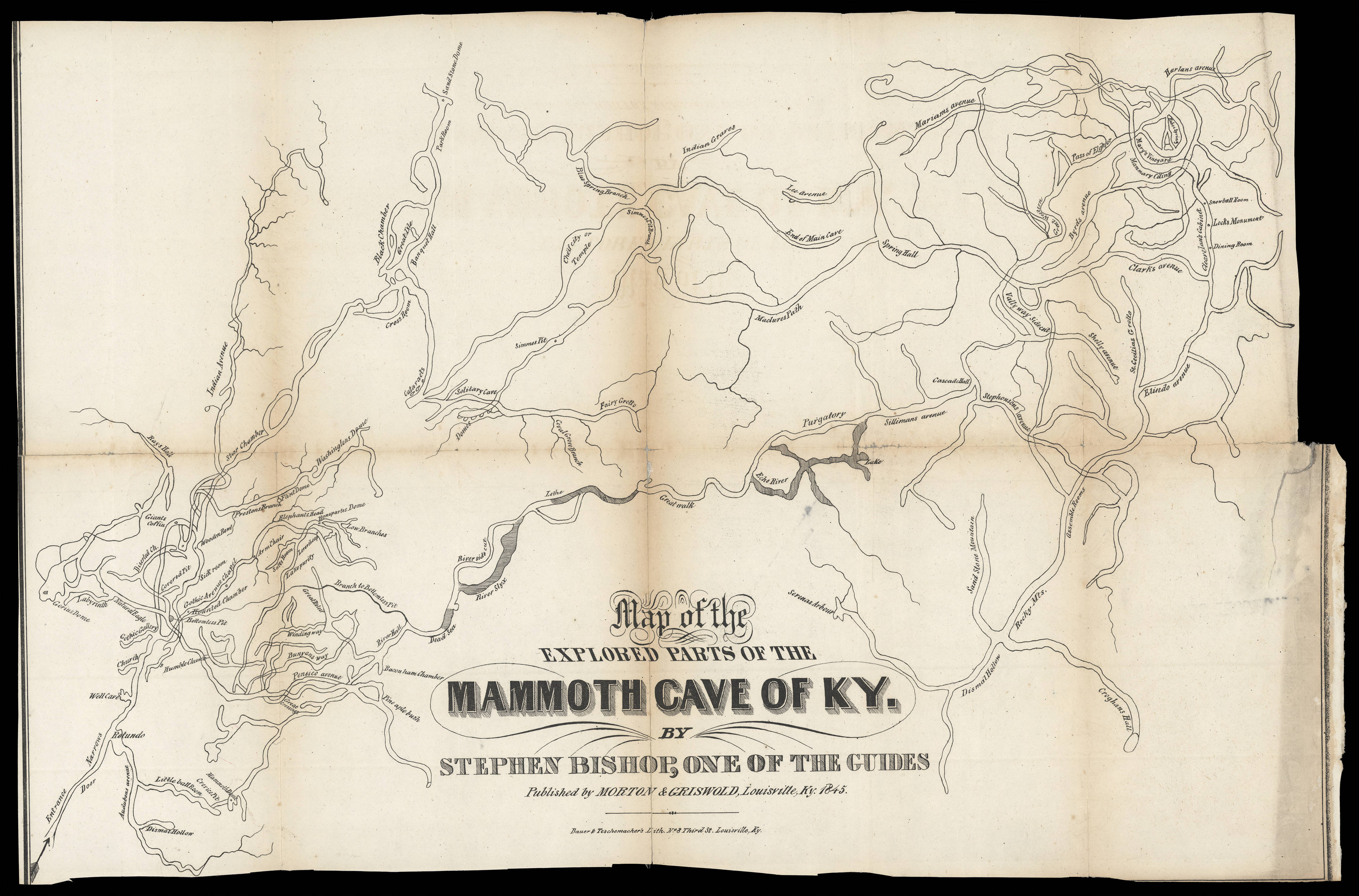
Bishop's 1842 map

Bishop's map showed some 16 kilometres (9.9 mi) of cave passages, half of which were discovered by him. While the map does not represent a modern accurate instrumental survey, he took some pains to indicate relative passage dimension and length. The topology, if not the scale and orientation, of the map is accurate, that is, the indications of junction layouts correspond to reality. Carol Ely, executive director of Croghan's Locust Grove estate, said that the map was "very accurate in terms of the topography and relationship of the various aspects of the cave’s many branches, less accurate in terms of exact distances."

In September 1972 a group of explorers discovered a connection between the Flint Ridge Cave system to the northeast and Mammoth Cave itself. Later it was realized that the Mammoth Cave end of the connection was actually indicated as a passage lead on Bishop's 1842 map, as a long thin line branching off from the eastern end of the Echo River complex. The construction in 1905 of a dam on the Green River had caused the passage to be flooded (and therefore inaccessibly hidden by murky water) most of the time after the dam's completion, and the passage was rediscovered backwards, from its remote end, by the cavers entering the Flint Ridge Cave System. Although he never knew its significance, Bishop had actually shown the key to connecting two major components of the longest cave in the world, 130 years before the connection was made in 1972.

== Family ==
During his time at Croghan's estate in 1842 Bishop met Charlotte Brown, an enslaved domestic worker for Croghan's family. They were married at Croghan's Locust Grove plantation. Charlotte gave birth to their son Thomas Bishop about a year later. Bishop's relative Ed followed in his footsteps and became a guide at Mammoth Cave, assisting Max Kämper with the first accurate instrumental survey of the system in 1908.

== Freedom and death ==
In 1852, Bishop guided author Willis to Echo River. On the trip, Willis learned that, despite knowing that he would be freed in five years, Bishop intended to buy his and his wife's and son's freedom and move to Liberia.

Bishop was freed in 1856, seven years after the death of his owner, in accordance with Croghan's will. While there are several accounts of Bishop speaking of planning to move to Liberia, he never went. In July 1857 Bishop and his wife sold their 112 acres (45 ha) plot of land near the cave but Bishop died sometime late that summer. (Note: There is a discrepancy between the sale date of the Bishops' land and Stephen's day of death on his wrong-year tombstone. The tombstone has a June 1857 death date (plus that wrong year) but sources state that the land near the cave was sold in July 1857.)

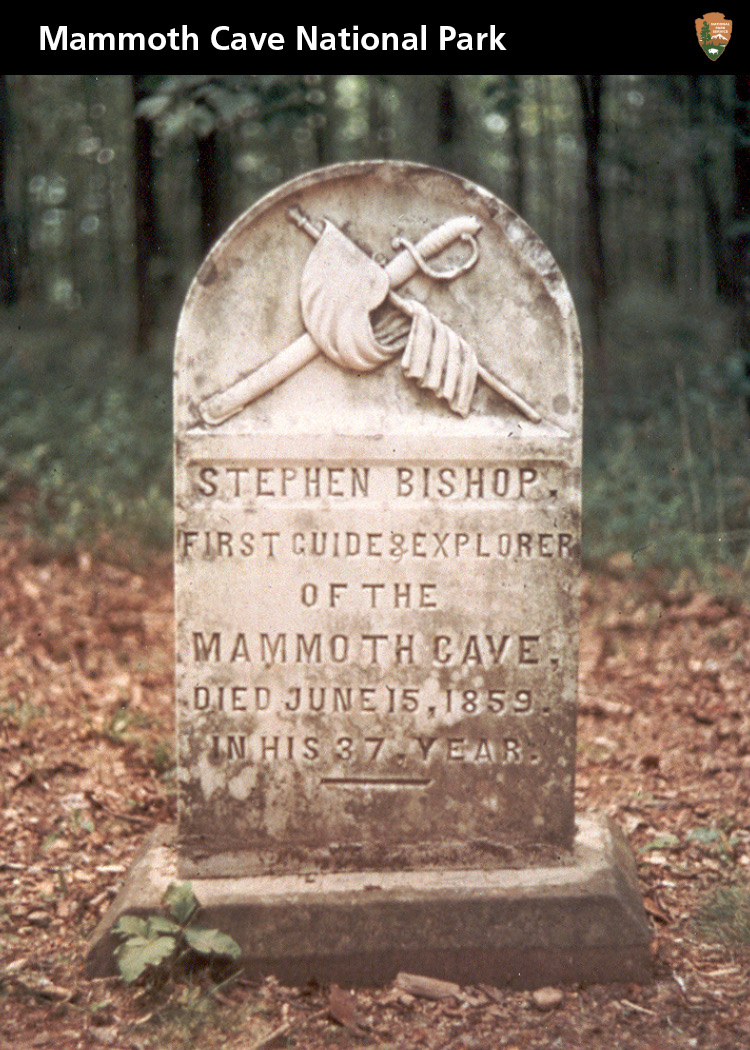
Stephen Bishop's tombstone

Bishop was buried on the south hill above the cave in what became known as "The Old Guides' Cemetery." After Stephen Bishop died, his widow Charlotte Brown Bishop married cave guide Nick Bransford, who served as a guide at Mammoth for over 50 years, until Bransford died in 1895. Harold Meloy, writing about Bishop in the book Cavers, Caves, & Caving states that "Pittsburgh millionaire James R. Mellon" visited the cave for one week in November 1878, where he heard stories of Bishop and met Charlotte, who then managed the hotel dining room. She led him to Stephen's gravesite, "which had only a cedar tree to mark it." Mellon promised to have a headstone carved for Stephen's grave. Three years later, Mellon arranged for a monument carver to prepare a second-hand tombstone, one that a Civil War soldier's family had not paid for (hence the appearance of a sword and flag in the lunette). The stone mason chiseled off the original name and placed an inscription that read,

STEPHEN BISHOP, FIRST GUIDE & EXPLORER OF THE MAMMOTH CAVE. DIED JUNE 15, 1859 IN HIS 37 YEAR.

The stone was shipped to the cave and installed on Bishop's grave. Meloy states "The error in the date of death [1859 vs. 1857] detracted nothing from the legend now reinforced by a permanent record in stone."
