= Jacob of Juterbogk =

Jacob of Juterbogk (c. 1381 – 30 April 1465) was a German monk and theologian. Benedict Stolzenhagen, known in religion as Jacob, was born at Jüterbog in Brandenburg of poor peasant stock. He became a Cistercian at the Paradyż Abbey in Poland, and was sent by the abbot to the University of Kraków, where he became master in philosophy and doctor of theology. He returned to his monastery, of which he became abbot. In 1441, however, he was discontented with the absence of strict discipline in his community, he obtained the leave of the papal legate at the council of Basel to transfer himself to the Carthusians, entering the monastery of Salvatorberg near Erfurt, of which he became prior. He lectured on theology at the University of Erfurt, of which he was rector in 1456, and wrote around eighty treatises. Like many men of his time, he promoted Conciliarism, the idea that a general council should be above the pope.

Jacob's main preoccupation was the reform of monastic life, the disorders of which he deplored, and to this end he wrote his Petitiones religiosorum pro reformatione sui status. Another work, De negligentia praelatorum, was directed against the neglect of their duties by the higher clergy, and he addressed a petition for the reform of the church (Advisamentum pro reformatione ecclesiae) to Pope Nicholas V. This having no effect, he issued the most outspoken of his works, De Septem ecclesiae statibus, in which he reviewed the work of the reforming councils of his time, and, without touching the question of doctrine, championed a drastic reform of life and practice of the church on the lines laid down at the Councils of Constance and Basel.

== Literature ==
- Meier, Ludger: Die Werke des Erfurter Kartäusers Jakob von Jüterbog in ihrer handschriftlichen Überlieferung, (=Beiträge zur Geschichte der Philosophie und Theologie des Mittelalters, 37/5), Verlag Aschendorff, Münster 1955
