= Reinsdorf Airfield =

Airfield in Germany

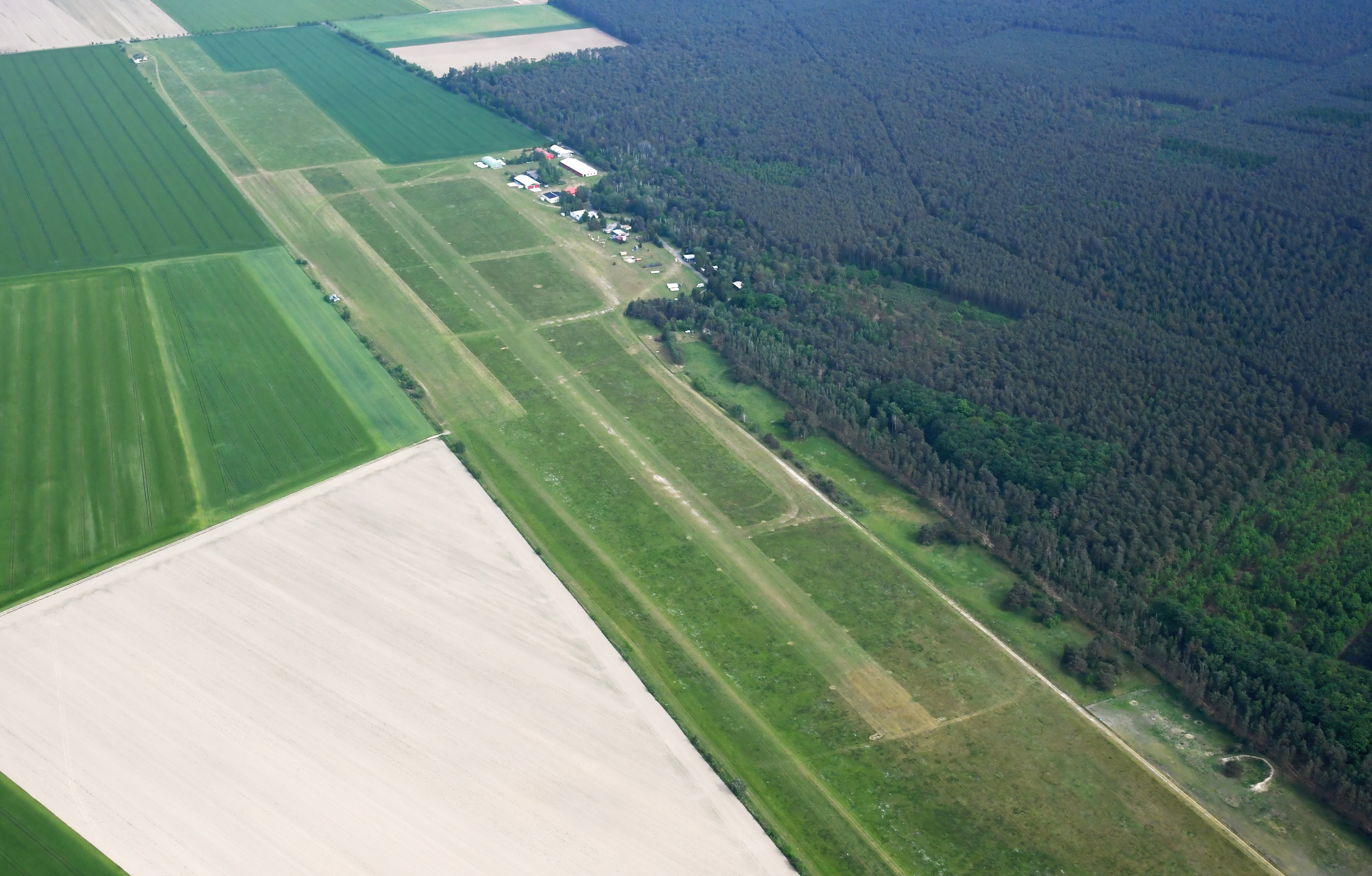
- IATA: none; ICAO: EDOD

Summary
- Airport type: Civilian
- Operator: Flugplatz Reinsdorf Betriebs GmbH
- Serves: Jüterbog
- Location: Reinsdorf, Teltow-Fläming
- Elevation AMSL: 335 ft / 102 m
- Coordinates: 51°54′06″N 13°11′48″E
- Website: www.edod.de

Map
- Location of airport in Germany

Runways
Direction	Length		Surface
Direction	ft	m	Surface
10/28		1,280	Grass

Statistics
- Aircraft movements: 10,000
- Frequency: 130.655 MHz; Source

Reinsdorf Airfield is a civilian airfield located in Reinsdorf (Teltow-Fläming), approximately 15 kilometres (9.3 mi) south-east of Jüterbog in Brandenburg, Germany.

The airport is mostly used by the civil aviation, including single engine aircraft up to 5 tons, ultralight aircraft, gliders and motorgliders. Over half of the flights are performed by gliders.

In the northern part of the airfield, gliders can perform high altitude winch launches with 2,600 cable, which makes this airfield almost unique in the world (together with the Rothenburg/Görlitz Airfield).
