= Johann Deutschmann =

German Lutheran theologian (1625–1706)

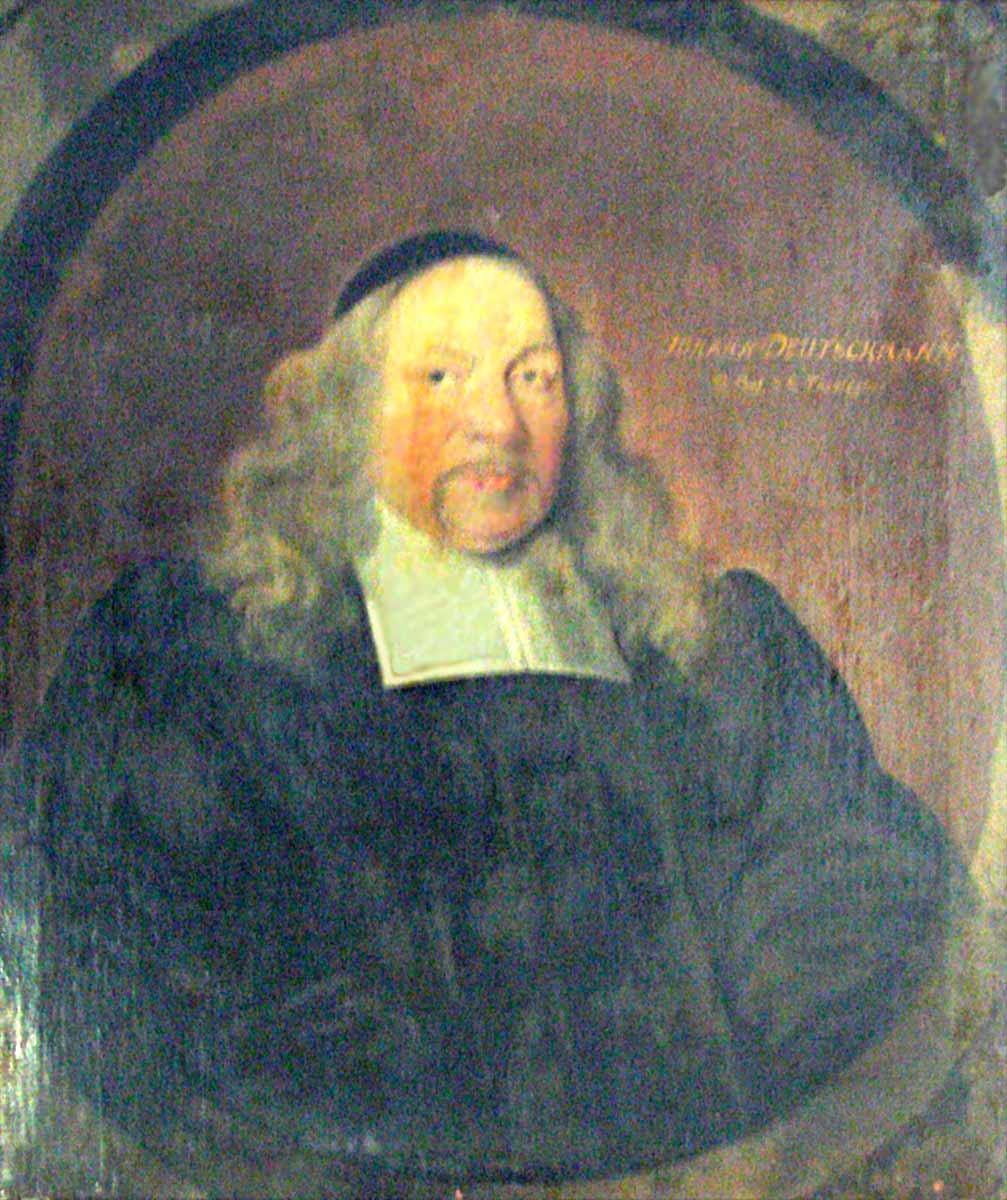
Johann Deutschmann

Johann Deutschmann (10 August 1625 – 12 August 1706) was a German Lutheran theologian.

== Life ==
Deutschmann was born in Jüterbog the son of Jeremiah Deutschmann (d.1655), a court assistant, and his wife, Anna Langen. He was educated in the local school. In 1639 he moved to Halle and completed his education there.

From 1645 he studied Philosophy at the University of Wittenberg. In 1657 he became extraordinary professor, and in 1662 ordinary professor at University of Wittenberg, replacing Johannes Meisner. During the Syncretistic Controversy and Pietistic controversy he represented the extreme orthodox Lutheranism; and opposed especially the younger Calixtus and the theology of the Pietists. Against Spener, the leader of the Pietists, he charged no less than 263 heresies. To his scientific interests belonged the development of the so-called Theologia paradisiaca, i.e., that Adam, the patriarchs, and the whole Old Testament agreed with the Augsburg Confession and Formulas of Concord. To prove this, he published an Antiquissima theologia positiva primi theologi Adami, a Symbolum apostolicum Adami; and Der christlutherischen Kirche Prediger-Beicht und Beichtstuhl von dem grossen Jehova-Elohim im Paradiese gestiftet.

He died in Wittenberg on 12 August 1706. He is memorialised in the Schlosskirche, Wittenberg.

== Family ==
In 1657 Deutschmann married Anna Catharina Calov (Calovius) daughter of the orthodox professor Abraham Calovius. .
