= Wichmann von Seeburg =

Statue of Wichmann in Magdeburg Cathedral

Wichmann von Seeburg (c. 1115 – 25 August 1192) was Bishop of Naumburg from 1150 until 1154 and Archbishop of Magdeburg from 1154 until his death. He became the first Magdeburg prince-archbishop in 1180

== Life ==
Wichmann was the second son of the Saxon count Gero of Seeburg (d. 1122) and his wife Matilda, a daughter of the Wettin count Thimo the Brave. He studied theology at the University of Paris before becoming a canon in Halberstadt. Throughout his long ecclesiastical career, he was a loyal supporter of the Hohenstaufen emperor Frederick Barbarossa against Pope Alexander III and an implacable military leader against the emperor's foes in the northeast, especially the Welf duke Henry the Lion.

Wichmann's seal.

Wichmann was elected Bishop of Naumburg-Zeitz in 1149 and ordained the next year. He made large donations to the monasteries of Pforta and Zeitz. A regular guest at the court of King Conrad III of Germany, he was quickly appointed to the Archdiocese of Magdeburg by Conrad's nephew, the newly crowned King Frederick Barbarossa in 1152. Wichmann initially had to overcome the resistance by Pope Eugene III and his successor Anastasius IV; nevertheless, he immediately endeavoured to extend his diocese and its economy, and actively promoted trade within the cities. In 1157, he allied with the Ascanian margrave Albert the Bear to re-conquer and Germanise the cities of Brandenburg and Jüterbog, whose vicinity he conquered and colonised with Flemish settlers (cf. Fläming). In 1170 he granted large estates to the newly established Cistercian monastery of Zinna.

He attended the 1160 Council of Pavia, supporting the election of Antipope Victor IV. In 1164, he undertook a pilgrimage to Palestine and fell for a time into Turkish hands. After supporting the election of Antipope Paschal III, he tried to adopt the position of a mediator with Pope Alexander III.

In 1166, Wichmann joined the German princes in war with Duke Henry the Lion, but he succeeded only in seeing his lands devastated. In 1175, he supplied auxiliaries to the emperor for his Italian campaign. He was in Venice negotiating the peace treaty in 1177. In 1178, he was back in Saxony for the war against Henry the Lion. He strongly worked for Henry's deposition and ban in 1180 and greatly profited from its actualisation, becoming the principal secular authority in Saxony after. He remained deeply predisposed against the Welfs, however.

In 1180 and 1185, he gave parts of his extensive possessions to Seitenstetten Abbey in Austria and to the Bishopric of Passau. He died on 25 August 1192 in the proximity of Köthen and was buried in his own cathedral. The city and diocese of Magdeburg had fully bloomed under his oversight. Wichmann is also credited with the first codification of magdeburg town law in 1188.

== Sources ==
- Thompson, James Westfall (1928). Feudal Germany, Volume II. New York: Frederick Ungar Publishing.

Preceded by Gunther II	Bishop of Naumburg; 1150–1154	Succeeded by Berthold I
Preceded by Frederick I	Archbishop of Magdeburg; 1152–1192	Succeeded by Ludolf
