= John Croghan =

American doctor (1790–1849)

Dr. John Croghan (April 23, 1790 – January 11, 1849) was an American medical doctor and slave owner who helped establish the United States Marine Hospital of Louisville and organized some tuberculosis medical experiments and tours for Mammoth Cave, in Kentucky (U.S.) during 1839–1849.

== Early life ==
John Croghan was born in Jefferson County, Kentucky on April 23, 1790. He was the son of William Croghan and Lucy Clark, sister of the famous William Clark of the Lewis and Clark Expedition. He attended the College of William and Mary, starting in 1807 and graduated in 1809. From 1810 to 1813, he was a student at the University of Pennsylvania's School of Medicine. He then returned to Kentucky where he helped establish the Louisville Marine Hospital in 1823, serving as its director until 1832.

== Work with Mammoth Cave ==
In October 1839, he bought 2,000 acres (8.1 km^{2}) near the Green River that included Mammoth Cave. He had planned to use the cave for medical purposes, as well as tourist use; he expected that its steady climate could benefit tuberculosis patients. Deep within the cave, patients with the disease lived in wooden and stone huts. Visitors during this experiment reported hearing constant coughing from the patients who appeared as pale, skeleton-like figures inside the huts. The smoke emitted by large fires, used for cooking and warmth, further harmed the patients. Several patients died, and the rest grew more sickly, causing the experiment to end in failure in 1843. Croghan's experiment added much to the medical profession's knowledge of tuberculosis and helped lead the way for control of the disease. Dr. Croghan himself died of the disease in 1849. Today, there are two remaining stone huts out of the original eight that can be found in Mammoth Cave.

He also continued using the cave as a tourist attraction. Following plans of the owner from the prior year, John Croghan used the services of Stephen Bishop, and other slaves, to conduct extensive mapping of the caves and provide guided tours. Interest in the caves grew. Dr. Croghan's own declining health, due to tuberculosis, led him to spend more time at his family's estate, Locust Grove, but he remained involved in the development of Mammoth Cave. He died on January 11, 1849, and left his estate and Mammoth Cave to his brother, his nieces, and his nephews, who organized cave tours until 1926.
