= George Croghan (disambiguation) =

George Croghan (1720–1782) was an Irish-American colonist, fur trader, and land speculator.

George Croghan may also refer to:

- George Croghan (soldier) (1791–1849), American soldier in the War of 1812 and the Mexican–American War

== See also ==
- George Croghan Reid, soldier
