= Forst Zinna rail disaster =

East German Rail Accident

Coordinates: 52.0601°N 13.1085°E

Details
- Date: 19 January 1988; 17:50
- Location: Forst Zinna
- Country: East Germany
- Operator: Deutsche Reichsbahn (East Germany)
- Service: Leipzig-Stralsund
- Incident type: Collision with a T-64 tank

Statistics
- Trains: 1
- Passengers: 450
- Deaths: 6
- Injured: 33

The Forst Zinna rail disaster occurred 19 January 1988 in Forst Zinna, East Germany. It was the result of a collision between a Soviet T-64A tank and an express train on the Berlin–Halle railway, in an area often used by the Soviet military for tank training. Six people were killed, and 33 were injured. It was one of the worst railway accidents in the history of the GDR.

== Background ==
The Berlin–Halle railway includes a section through Forst Zinna, a Soviet military training ground, which was nicknamed the "cannon railway" by train drivers, after a series of accidents where military vehicles strayed on the tracks or stray bullets hit trains.

== Disaster ==
The train involved in the crash was a DR Class 211 locomotive pulling an express train consisting of 12 passenger cars and a restaurant car on the way from Leipzig to Stralsund via Berlin. The train carried around 450 passengers, although it would normally carry around 1000 passengers.

A 19-year-old driver named Okhapov from the Kazakh SSR, was undergoing training for driving a T-64A tank by 20-year-old instructor Andrei Petukhov from the Russian SFSR. This was the trainee's first time driving the tank, and it was dark.

The instructor called to the trainee to turn right, but this was probably misunderstood by the Kazakh driver due to a language barrier. The trainer, realizing they were heading towards the busy rail line, attempted to warn his trainee over the radio to stop the tank. Receiving no response, he then attempted to stop the tank using an emergency switch; however, the switch was defective. As the tank stood on the train tracks, the inexperienced driver stalled the tank's engine. Hearing the sound of an oncoming train, the crew abandoned the tank. Seconds later, around 5:50 pm, the train collided with the tank at almost 120 km/h. The collision instantly killed both drivers of the train and shunted the tank 130 metres forward. In total, 6 people were killed, and 33 people were severely injured.

== Aftermath ==
Soldiers from the nearby barracks rushed to the scene to help with rescue operations. Around 90 minutes later, Potsdam police arrived. The tank crew was initially arrested and questioned by the police, an unprecedented event at that time. Police also required permission from the military superiors to be allowed to photograph the inside of the tank. Relations between the GDR and USSR were already strained due to disagreements between the policies of Erich Honecker and Mikhail Gorbachev. The police report directly blamed the Soviets, concluding that the train driver would not have been able to stop the train in time. The tank crew were quickly sent to Moscow to be tried by a military tribunal of the Soviet Army. The outcome is unknown. It was rumored that both were executed by firing squad, and some of the injured train passengers had begged Soviet authorities to not give them a death sentence. A number of Russian sources, including Internet forums of former Forst Zinna military personnel, state that driver, instructor and several officers were penalized by disciplinary actions.

The incident was reported on by GDR media surprisingly openly and was also reported on by West German Tagesschau the next day.

The area would later have dragon's teeth added to the areas near the rail track to prevent further incidents of tanks crossing onto the rail line.

== See also ==
- Lists of rail accidents
