= Max Kämper =

German mining engineer (1879–1916)

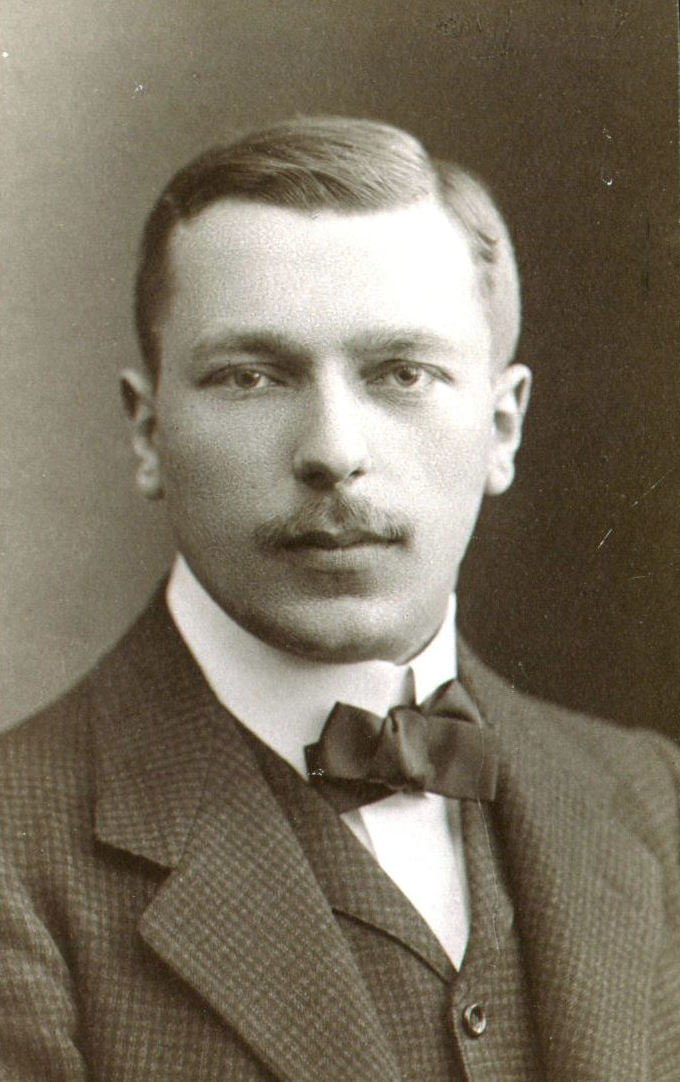
- Born: 16 December 1879; Jüterbog, Germany
- Died: 10 November 1916 (aged 36); Sailly-Saillisel, France

Max Kämper (16 December 1879 in Jüterbog – 10 November 1916 in Sailly-Saillisel) was a German mining engineer.

His 1908 survey and map of Mammoth Cave, Kentucky, assisted by cave guide Ed Bishop, represent the first accurate instrumental survey of portions of the cave system. Kämper arrived at Mammoth Cave in 1908 and left 8 months later in 1909.

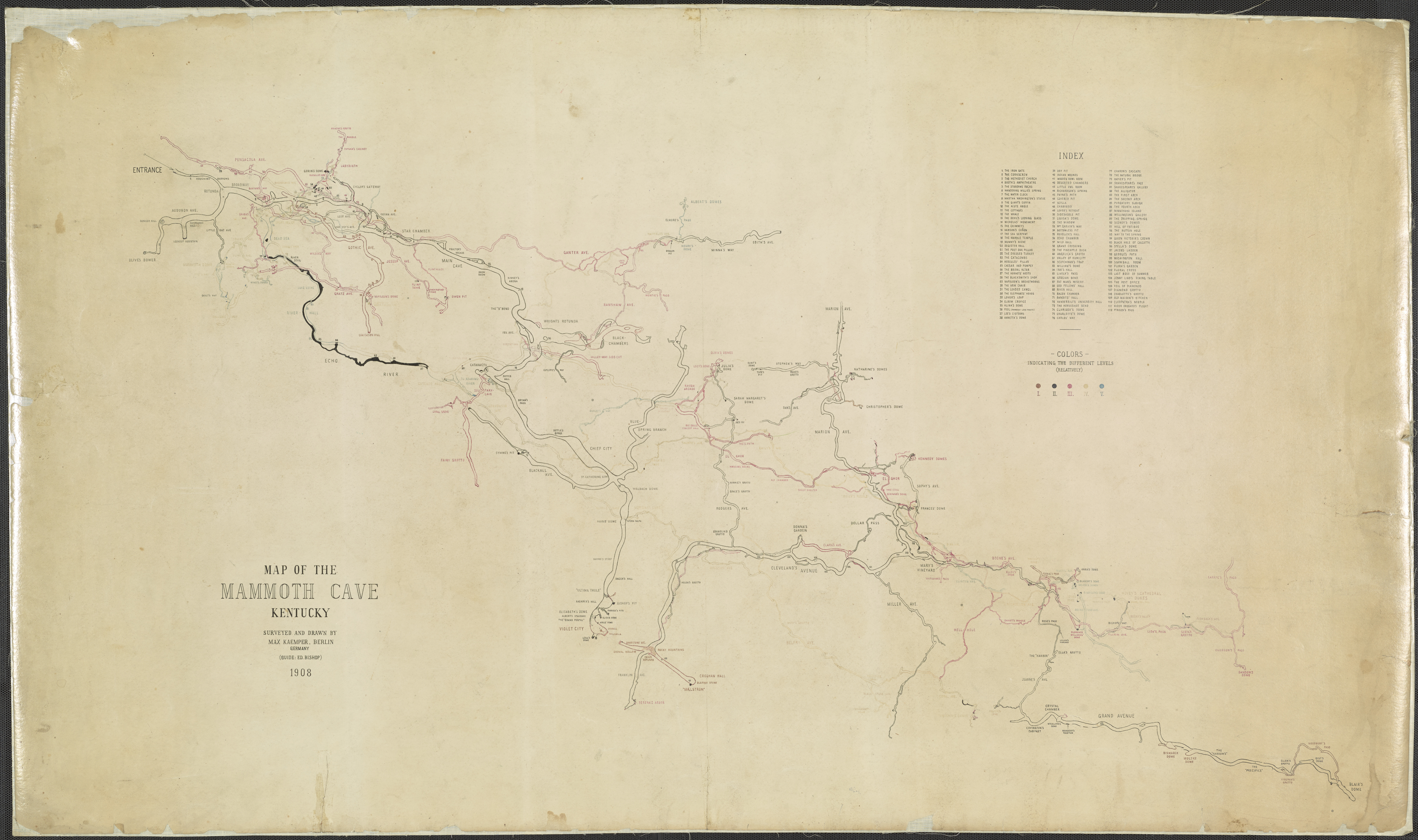
1908 map of Mammoth Cave, produced by Max Kämper with Ed Bishop as his guide

Kämper was killed in trench warfare at the Somme River in north-eastern France, on 10 November 1916, during the closing days of the Battle of the Somme. He is buried in the War Cemetery of Cambrai near Arras, France.
