= Demon cavefish =

Scientific classification
- Kingdom: Animalia
- Phylum: Chordata
- Class: Actinopterygii
- Division: Teleostei
- Order: Percopsiformes
- Family: Amblyopsidae
- Genus: Demogorgonichthys; Hart, Niemiller, Sandel & Armbruster, 2026
- Species: D. arcanus

Binomial name
- Demogorgonichthys arcanus Hart, Niemiller, Sandel & Armbruster, 2026

Species of cavefish endemic to Alabama

The demon cavefish (Demogorgonichthys arcanus) is a species of blind cavefish in the family Amblyopsidae. It is the only known species in the genus Demogorgonichthys and is known only from Bobcat Cave and its associated aquifer at Redstone Arsenal in northern Alabama, United States. The genus and species were formally described in 2026.

The species inhabits the same cave pools as the southern cavefish (Typhlichthys subterraneus), although genetic analyses indicate that the two species are not closely related. Their similar cave-adapted features therefore represent an example of convergent evolution.

== Taxonomy and discovery ==
The fish was first documented during biological surveys of Bobcat Cave in February 2025. The cave had been monitored for decades because it also supports the federally endangered Alabama cave shrimp. Matthew Niemiller noticed that some of the fish differed from the southern cavefish already known from the cave. Subsequent anatomical examinations, CT scans and genetic analyses showed that the specimens represented both a new genus and a new species.

The holotype, measuring 42.1 mm (1.66 in) in standard length, was collected from Bobcat Cave on February 10, 2025. The generic name combines Demogorgon, an underworld figure also used in Dungeons & Dragons and Stranger Things, with the Greek word ichthys, meaning fish. The specific epithet arcanus means “hidden” or “secret”.

== Description ==
The demon cavefish lacks visible eyes and pigmentation and has pale, translucent skin. It has a pronounced hump behind the head, a long and flattened snout, deeply embedded scales and fins composed entirely of unbranched rays. Pelvic fins are absent.

Analysis of the vision-related rhodopsin gene revealed a large deletion that causes a frameshift and premature stop codons, together with a second smaller deletion. These mutations differ from those found in other amblyopsid cavefish and support an independent loss of vision in the lineage.

== Distribution and ecology ==
The species is known only from Bobcat Cave, on the northern side of the Tennessee River valley in southwestern Madison County, Alabama. Individuals probably spend much of their lives in parts of the aquifer that cannot be reached by researchers. Water levels in the cave vary substantially, while mud and periodic turbidity make the fish difficult to detect.

Little is known about its diet, reproduction or population size. No egg-bearing female had been documented when the species was described.

== Conservation ==
The demon cavefish has not received a formal assessment on the IUCN Red List. Its describers concluded that its known distribution would meet the thresholds for critically endangered status under IUCN criterion B and would support a provisional NatureServe global rank of G1, or critically imperiled.

Potential threats include surface runoff, sediment, groundwater contamination and extreme fluctuations between flooding and drought. Elevated concentrations of cadmium, chromium and lead have previously been detected in the cave system. Although its location within a restricted military installation reduces direct human disturbance, it does not protect the aquifer from environmental effects originating outside the accessible cave passages.
