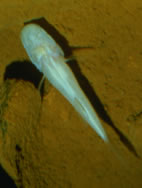

Conservation status
- Critically Endangered (IUCN 3.1)

- Endangered (ESA)

Scientific classification
- Kingdom: Animalia
- Phylum: Chordata
- Class: Actinopterygii
- Division: Teleostei
- Order: Percopsiformes
- Family: Amblyopsidae
- Genus: Speoplatyrhinus; J. E. Cooper & Kuehne, 1974
- Species: S. poulsoni

Binomial name
- Speoplatyrhinus poulsoni J. E. Cooper & Kuehne, 1974
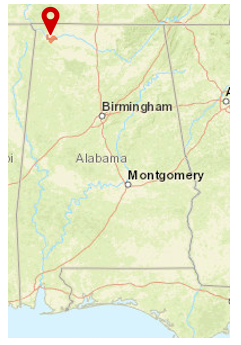
- The range of the Alabama cavefish

= Alabama cavefish =

Species of fish

The Alabama cavefish (Speoplatyrhinus poulsoni) is a critically endangered species of amblyopsid cavefish found only in underground pools in Key Cave, located in northwestern Alabama, United States in the Key Cave National Wildlife Refuge. It was discovered underneath a colony of gray bats in 1967 by researchers Robert A. Kuehne and John E. Cooper and scientifically described in 1974.

On any single visit to the cave, no more than 10 individuals of this fish have been observed, and scientists estimate fewer than 100 are left. This species of fish is believed to be the rarest species of cavefish in the United States and one of the rarest of all freshwater fish, as researchers have failed to find the fish in any other location. The Alabama cavefish exists in a fragile ecosystem based on nutrient-rich guano of the gray bat.

Little is known of the reproductive habits and life history of the Alabama cavefish. However, researchers agree that the flooding of the cave triggers a hormonal change in the cavefish, prompting the fish to begin the reproductive cycle. Thus, variations in the frequency of the cave flooding negatively affect the survival of the species.

Unfortunately, the Alabama cavefish is in danger of extinction, according to both the ESA and IUCN listings. Conservation measures that have been taken to save the species from extinction include protecting the fish under the Lacey Act and limiting human disturbance of Key Cave, the species' critical habitat.

== Habitat and distribution ==
The Alabama cavefish is one of the rarest cavefish species in North America. While the specific habitat requirements of the fish are unknown, it is known that the Alabama cavefish is a cave obligate, restricted to Key Cave in Lauderdale County, Alabama. Key Cave is the critical habitat of the Alabama cavefish. Cave habitats tend to be stable, with drastic changes mainly being associated with the inflow of water. Annual rainfall and flooding in the cave produce changes in water level, temperature, and food availability for the fish. Researchers speculate that the flooding may trigger a hormonal change in the cavefish for growth and reproduction.

Since the discovery of the cavefish, only nine specimens have been collected (all before 1983). Because very few individuals have been collected and observed, and the population is confined to Key Cave, the Alabama cavefish is believed to be the rarest of the American cavefish and the rarest of all freshwater fish.

Since the underground water system in the area is so widespread, researchers had hoped that the cavefish had dispersed to other sites. However, studies of the 120 other caves in the area, conducted since 1977, have failed to locate any other Alabama cavefish populations. No more than 10 individuals have been observed on any single visit to the Key Cave, and in the 36 visits from 1967 to 1998, the average was less than 4 per visit. The total number of individuals in the Key Cave population is estimated to be less than 100. Initially classified as vulnerable by the IUCN, its status has been gradually upgraded as its extreme rarity became apparent. The Alabama cavefish is currently considered critically endangered by the IUCN. Two reports of these fish in a nearby cave, Collier Cave, are still unconfirmed. Both Key Cave and Collier Cave are protected and inaccessible to the public.

Because its known range is limited to a single cave, the Alabama cavefish has an uncertain future, being threatened by changes in groundwater quality and level, changes in aquifer characteristics, and diminished organic input, as well as competition and predation. It also may compete for resources with the syntopic southern cavefish (Typhlichthys subterraneus), which is more abundant and aggressive. Furthermore, cave crayfish feed on Alabama cavefish.

== Physiology ==
The Alabama cavefish is roughly 7.2 cm (2.8 in) in length and has no eyes or discernible pigmentation, appearing semitransparent with a slight pink hue. Its large head makes up more than one-third of its length. The Alabama cavefish is the only species in its genus and can be distinguished from other cavefish by its elongated, flattened head with a laterally constricted snout and a terminal mouth. The Alabama cavefish lacks pelvic fins, and its fin rays are unbranched with the fin membranes deeply incised between the rays. It has an elaborate system of sensory papillae arranged in ridges on the head and sides, an adaptation to the dark environment of the cave. The Alabama cavefish has the most highly developed caudal sensory papillae in the family Amblyopsidae.

== Diet ==
The diet of the Alabama cavefish, which consists of copepods, isopods, amphipods, and smaller cavefish, is supported by the nutrient-filled bat guano. It also can survive on other small organisms such as mites, spiders, millipedes, beetles, and other insects.

== Life history and reproduction ==
There is little information available on both the life history and reproductive cycle of the Alabama cavefish. It is hypothesized that, because of the jugular position of the vent and the size of the branchial chamber, the Alabama cavefish practices branchial incubation, or mouth-brooding. The Alabama cavefish, like most fish, utilizes seasonal cues to trigger hormonal changes that lead to its growth and reproduction. While most fish rely on a large change in water temperature or photoperiod, the Alabama cavefish mainly relies on the flooding of the cave in the winter and spring. This flooding results in an increased inflow of water into the cave and a small temperature change, signaling to the cavefish to begin reproduction. Even with these cues, reproduction does not occur every year for the Alabama cavefish. In years when reproduction does occur, only a few eggs are produced per female. Assumptions about the life history of the Alabama cavefish are largely based on information from the Northern cavefish, which sees only about 20% of the females spawn in a given year. It is hypothesized that the population growth for the Alabama cavefish is less than half of that of the Northern cavefish. Furthermore, the maximum longevity of the Alabama cavefish is estimated to be around 5–10 years; however, this estimate could be off by a factor of 3 or 4.

== Listing history ==
=== Endangered Species Act ===
The Alabama cavefish was first listed as a threatened species under the Endangered Species Act in 1977. Following further assessment of the species' range and changing environmental conditions, the cavefish was considered an endangered species in 1988. By 1990, a recovery plan was created for the fish, which stipulates that the species would be down-listed when the following three criteria are met: (1) three other viable populations are found in discontinuous aquatic systems outside the Key Cave area, (2) the aquifer recharge areas for all four populations are protected, and (3) all four populations are demonstrated to be stable or increasing over at least a 20-year period.

In 2019, amendments to the recovery plan were made that changed the criteria for down-listing and created a criterion for delisting. For the cavefish to be down-listed, the criteria now stipulate that: (1) the species must demonstrate a stable or increasing trend in the existing Key Cave population, (2) two more cavefish populations must be created, and (3) the aquifer recharge areas must be delineated, mapped, and protected. In order for the cavefish to be delisted entirely, however, the aquifer recharge area must be protected by a conservation mechanism for at least one of the new populations and all other threats to the cavefish must be addressed or managed, allowing viability for the foreseeable future.

=== International Union for Conservation of Nature Red List ===
The Alabama cavefish was first listed on the IUCN Red List of Threatened Species in 1986 as vulnerable and remained in that category following re-evaluation in 1988. Two years later, in 1990, the status of the cavefish was reassessed and upgraded to endangered, which was then again confirmed by a reassessment in 1994. In 1996, the Alabama cavefish was again upgraded to critically endangered due to its lack of extent (100 sq. km), low population size, and numerous habitat challenges. The species was last assessed in April 2012, and although its population trend is stable, it is still listed as critically endangered.

== Conservation ==
There are a few current conservation measures put in place to protect the Alabama cavefish. Along with being listed under the ESA, the species is protected by the Lacey Act. This makes it unlawful to import, export, transport, sell, receive, acquire, or purchase (alive or dead, including parts, products, eggs, or offspring) the Alabama cavefish. Secondly, The Tennessee Valley Authority, which owns the two entrances to the caves, has installed a fence to limit human disturbance. Lastly, in 1997, the Key Cave National Wildlife Refuge (NWR) was established. The Key Cave NWR aims at ensuring the biological integrity of the cave by protecting the sinkholes that carry surface water directly into the aquifer of the cave.

== Human impact ==
The largest human-induced threat to the survival of the Alabama cavefish is groundwater contamination within the recharge area of Key Cave. The recharge area is the place where water seeps into the ground and refills the aquifer. A major source of contamination is the chemicals used to cultivate crops grown in the areas surrounding the cave. Furthermore, the collection of the species by amateurs or for scientific purposes poses a major threat due to the already small population size.

== Factors likely to cause extinction ==
Many factors that are likely to cause the extinction of the Alabama cavefish are associated with the recharge zone of the Key Cave. The degradation of the groundwater due to agrochemicals and the decreasing level of groundwater limit the entry and cycling of uncontaminated water into Key Cave. The alteration of flood cycles within the aquifer often leads to unsuccessful cavefish reproduction. Furthermore, the gray bat, Myotis grisescens, which is also protected under the ESA, provides nutrients to the Alabama cavefish through its guano. Therefore, the threats facing this bat species also impact the Alabama cavefish and its fuel source. All of these factors, combined with the already small population size and limited home range, pose severe threats to the Alabama cavefish.
