= O. australis =

O. australis may refer to:

- Orconectes australis, the cave crayfish, a freshwater crayfish species native to the eastern United States
- Oxyura australis, the blue-billed duck, a small Australian stiff-tailed duck species endemic to Australia

== See also ==
- Australis (disambiguation)
