= Bobcat Cave (Alabama) =

Cave in North Alabama

- Interactive map of Bobcat Cave
- Location: Redstone Arsenal, Madison County, Alabama
- Coordinates: 34.6686°N 86.7130°W
- Length: 454 m (1,490 ft)
- Discovery: Early 1970s
- Geology: Tuscumbia Limestone
- Hazards: Flooding
- Access: Restricted

Bobcat Cave is a karst cave system (approx. 454 meters long) located within the U.S. Army's Redstone Arsenal campus in Madison County, Alabama. It is well documented for its rare troglofauna diversity.

== Geology & hydrology ==
Bobcat Cave is developed within Tuscumbia Limestone, a Mississippian-age geological formation characterized by fossiliferous limestone and discontinuous chert deposits.

The cave's water levels respond rapidly to precipitation, with fluctuations of up to 3.9 meters during heavy rain. Floodwaters can submerge most of the cave, while dry conditions may leave only scattered pools. Much of the cave's groundwater recharge originates from surface runoff. A localized northward groundwater flow has been documented near the cave, contrasting with the broader southward regional flow.

== Cave biology ==
Bobcat Cave is well-known for the rare cave-obligate species which inhabit the system. Specifically, it is well documented for its populations of Alabama Cave Shrimp (Palaemonias alabamae), a federally endangered crustacean known from only a handful of cave systems in northern Alabama. It is also home to two cavefish species, the Southern Cavefish (Typhlichthys subterraneus), and the Demon Cavefish (Demogorgonichthys arcanus). These two species of cavefish are not closely related, and although they look similar superficially, they evolved their adaptations to cave life (loss of eyes and pigment) completely separately, in a display of convergent evolution.

The Demon Cavefish (Demogorgonichthys arcanus), described in 2026, is endemic to Bobcat Cave. The researchers who described the species concluded that it qualified for G1 (Critically Imperiled) according to NatureServe's status framework, and CR (Critically Endangered) under the IUCN Red List framework, although neither organization has officially ranked the species. These provisional rankings are primarily due to the species reliance on a single cave system and its related aquifer, which makes it inherently vulnerable to extinction in the case of severe changes in water conditions such as development or groundwater contaminants.

Bobcat Cave is also the type locality of the nicoletiid silverfish species Spinanycta alabamensis described in 2024.

== Discovery & research ==
Bobcat Cave was discovered in the early 1970s and gained scientific significance following the discovery of the largest known population of the Alabama Cave Shrimp (Palaemonias alabamae) during a mapping expedition by the Huntsville Grotto of the National Speleological Society in 1973.

Beginning in 1990, Bobcat Cave became the subject of long-term biological and hydrological monitoring by the Geological Survey of Alabama, primarily to safeguard the Alabama cave shrimp population.
