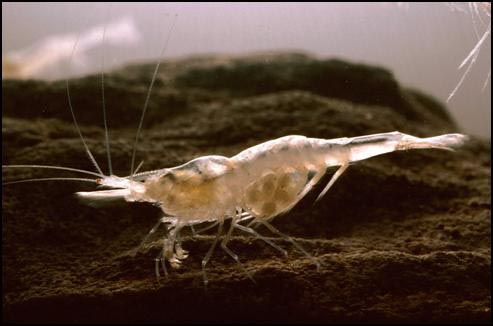

Conservation status
- Vulnerable (IUCN 3.1)

Scientific classification
- Kingdom: Animalia
- Phylum: Arthropoda
- Clade: Pancrustacea
- Class: Malacostraca
- Order: Decapoda
- Suborder: Pleocyemata
- Infraorder: Caridea
- Family: Atyidae
- Genus: Palaemonias
- Species: P. ganteri

Binomial name
- Palaemonias ganteri Hay, 1901

= Kentucky cave shrimp =

Species of shrimp

The Kentucky cave shrimp (Palaemonias ganteri) is a species of shrimp that belongs to the family Atyidae. This species can be found in the caves of the U.S state of Kentucky. It closely resembles one closest relative, the Alabama cave shrimp (Palaemonias alabamae). It is eyeless and its shell has no pigment meaning that this species is nearly transparent.

It was described in the year 1901 by William Perry Hay, an American zoologist known for his work with crayfish and reptiles.

== Distribution ==
It is endemic to caves and underground stream located in Mammoth Cave National Park region of central Kentucky including the counties of Barren, Edmonson, Hart and Warren.

== Ecology ==
The shrimp feeds mainly on sediments that are washed into the cave by the movement of groundwater.

== Conservation ==
The Kentucky cave shrimp was registered as an endangered species under the Endangered Species Act in 1983, and was included on the IUCN Red List as Endangered in 1994. There are currently only several thousand remaining. They were thought to have only inhabited the Mammoth Cave System. This meant that they were assumed to be extinct when there was a lack of reported sightings between May 1979 and February 1981. However scuba divers have reported sighting in deep pools of streams and in submerged passages. These pools have now been called “Shrimp pools”.

=== Threats ===
Their populations are mostly threatened by contaminated groundwater running into its habitat. Several nearby communities either have inadequate sewage treatment facilities or lack such facilities altogether. An additional potential threat is the entry of contaminants from traffic accidents and roadside businesses. One incident in 1979 caused the death of aquatic cave organisms in a part of the Mammoth Cave system, and in a 1980 incident, a truck carrying toxic cyanide salts overturned on Interstate 65, just south of Mammoth Cave National Park.

A recovery plan is underway which includes:

1. Surveying the location and extent of all areas supporting shrimp
2. Conducting life history and other research required to determine what constitutes a viable population
3. Monitoring population status
4. Maintaining adequate water quality;
5. Protecting the shrimp from introduced predators
6. Producing and conducting public education programs.
