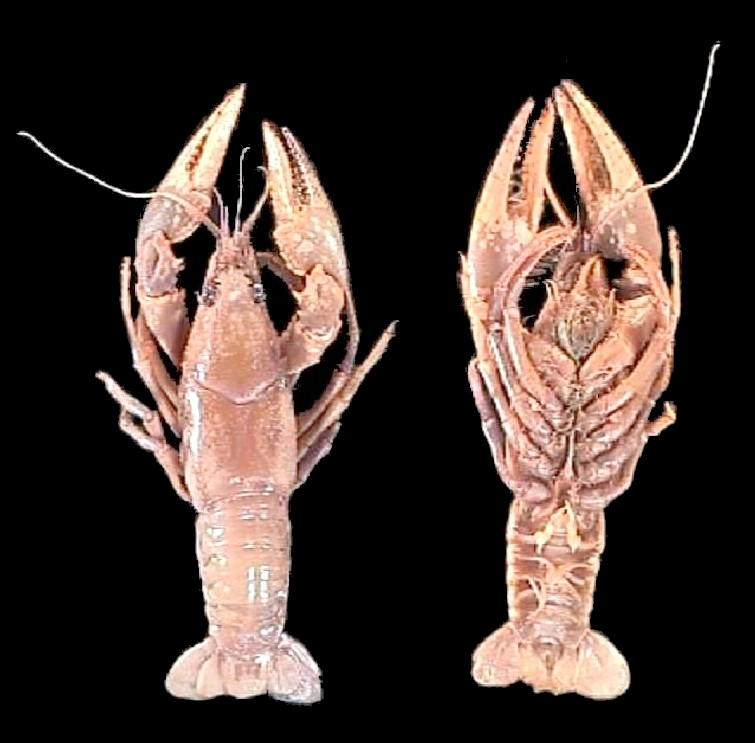

Scientific classification
- Kingdom: Animalia
- Phylum: Arthropoda
- Class: Malacostraca
- Order: Decapoda
- Suborder: Pleocyemata
- Family: Cambaridae
- Genus: Orconectes; Cope, 1872

Type species
- Orconectes inermis Cope, 1872

= Orconectes =

Genus of crayfish

Orconectes is a genus of cave dwelling freshwater crayfish, endemic to suitable habitats in the eastern United States. Surface dwelling species, formerly categorised here, were moved to Faxonius in 2017.

Due to their subterranean habitat, they are usually depigmented, often blind, and are long-lived. Ages of 176 years have been claimed for O. australis, though this was reduced to ≤22 years in a 2012 study.

== Taxonomy ==
The genus Orconectes was erected in 1872 by Edward Drinker Cope to house Astacus pellucidus (now Orconectes pellucidus) and his new species, Orconectes inermis.

Prior to the 2017 review by Oxford university, the genus contained 85 species in 11 subgenera. The Faxonius subgenus was raised to a full genus, and the majority of species formerly recorded as Orconectes were moved there. Following the review, approximately 8 species are known:

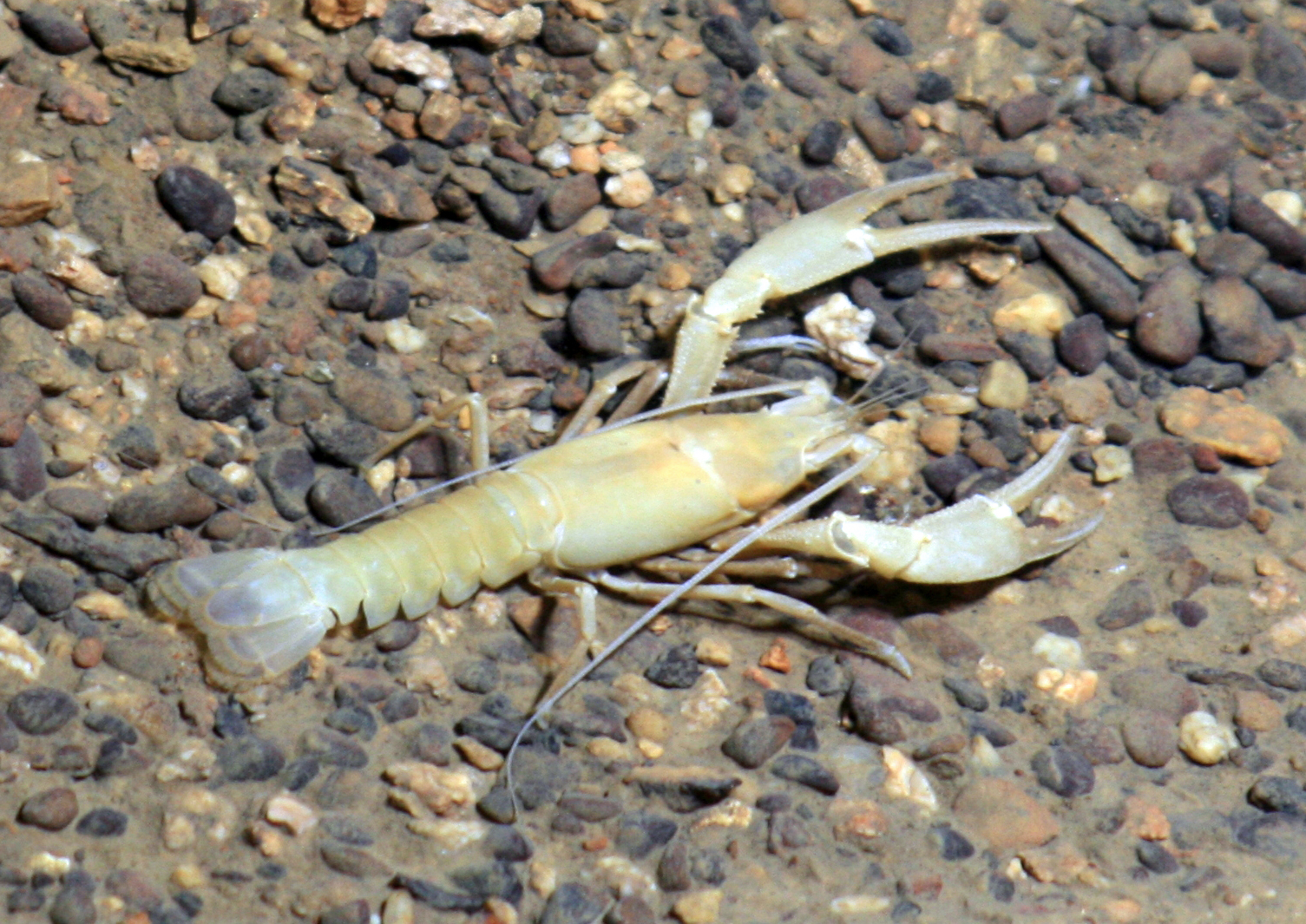
O. pellucidus (Mammoth Cave, Kentucky, USA)

Scientific name	Authority	Common name	Red List status	Type locality
O. australis	(Rhoades, 1941)	southern cave crayfish	LC	Shelta Cavern, Madison County, Alabama
O. barri	Buhay & Crandall, 2008	Cumberland Plateau cave crayfish	DD	Tonya's Cave, Wayne County, Kentucky
O. incomptus	Hobbs & Barr, 1972	Tennessee cave crayfish	VU	Cherry Cave, Jackson County, Tennessee
O. inermis inermis	Cope, 1872	ghost crayfish	LC	Wyandotte Caves, Crawford County, Indiana
O. inermis testii	(Hay, 1891)	unarmed crayfish	LC	Mayfield's Cave, Monroe County, Indiana
O. packardi	Rhoades, 1944	Appalachian cave crayfish	EN	Cumberland Crystal Cave, Pulaski County, Kentucky
O. pellucidus	(Tellkampf, 1844)	Mammoth Cave crayfish	LC	Mammoth Cave National Park, Kentucky
O. sheltae	Cooper & Cooper, 1997	Shelta cave crayfish	CR	Shelta Cave, Madison County, Alabama
O. stygocaneyi	Hobbs, 2001	Caney Mountain cave crayfish	LC	Mud Cave, Caney Mountain Conservation Area, Ozark County, Missouri
