= Orconectes packardi =

Conservation status
- Vulnerable (IUCN 3.1)

- Imperiled (NatureServe)

Scientific classification
- Kingdom: Animalia
- Phylum: Arthropoda
- Class: Malacostraca
- Order: Decapoda
- Suborder: Pleocyemata
- Family: Cambaridae
- Genus: Orconectes
- Species: O. packardi

Binomial name
- Orconectes packardi Rhoades, 1944

Synonyms
- Orconectes australis ssp. packardi

Species of crayfish

Orconectes packardi, the Appalachian cave crayfish, is a species of crayfish in the family Cambaridae. It is endemic to Kentucky, where it is found in 16 caves in four southeastern counties in the Cumberland River basin.

Formerly a subspecies of O. australis, it was raised to species status by Buhay and Crandall in 2008.
