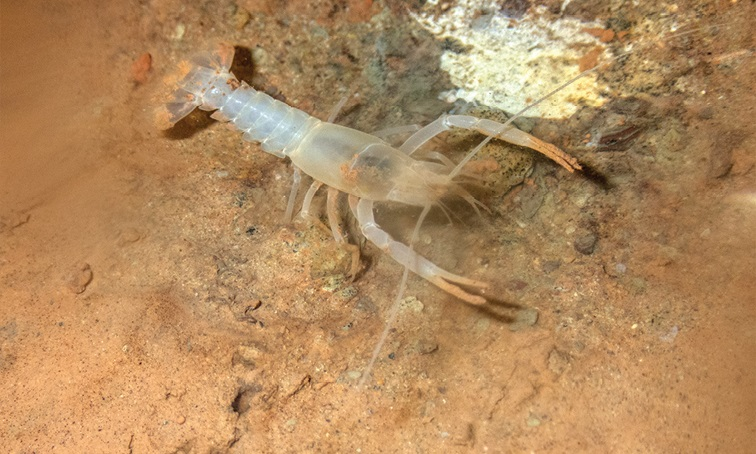
- Male
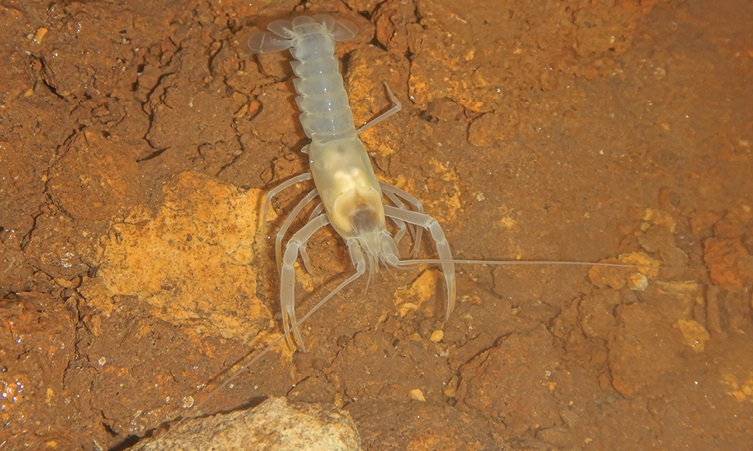
- Female

Conservation status
- Critically Endangered (IUCN 3.1)

- Critically Imperiled (NatureServe)

Scientific classification
- Kingdom: Animalia
- Phylum: Arthropoda
- Class: Malacostraca
- Order: Decapoda
- Suborder: Pleocyemata
- Family: Cambaridae
- Genus: Orconectes
- Species: O. sheltae

Binomial name
- Orconectes sheltae J. E. Cooper and M. R. Cooper, 1997

= Orconectes sheltae =

Species of crayfish

Orconectes sheltae, the Shelta Cave crayfish, is a small, freshwater crayfish endemic to Alabama in the United States. It is a cave-dwelling species known from only one cave, Shelta Cave in Madison County, Alabama. This cave is also home to O. australis and Cambarus jonesi.

It was first discovered in 1963, before being formally described in 1997. The last cave survey to successfully locate the species was in 1988, and therefore it was considered as being extinct for over 30 years until its rediscovery in 2019.
