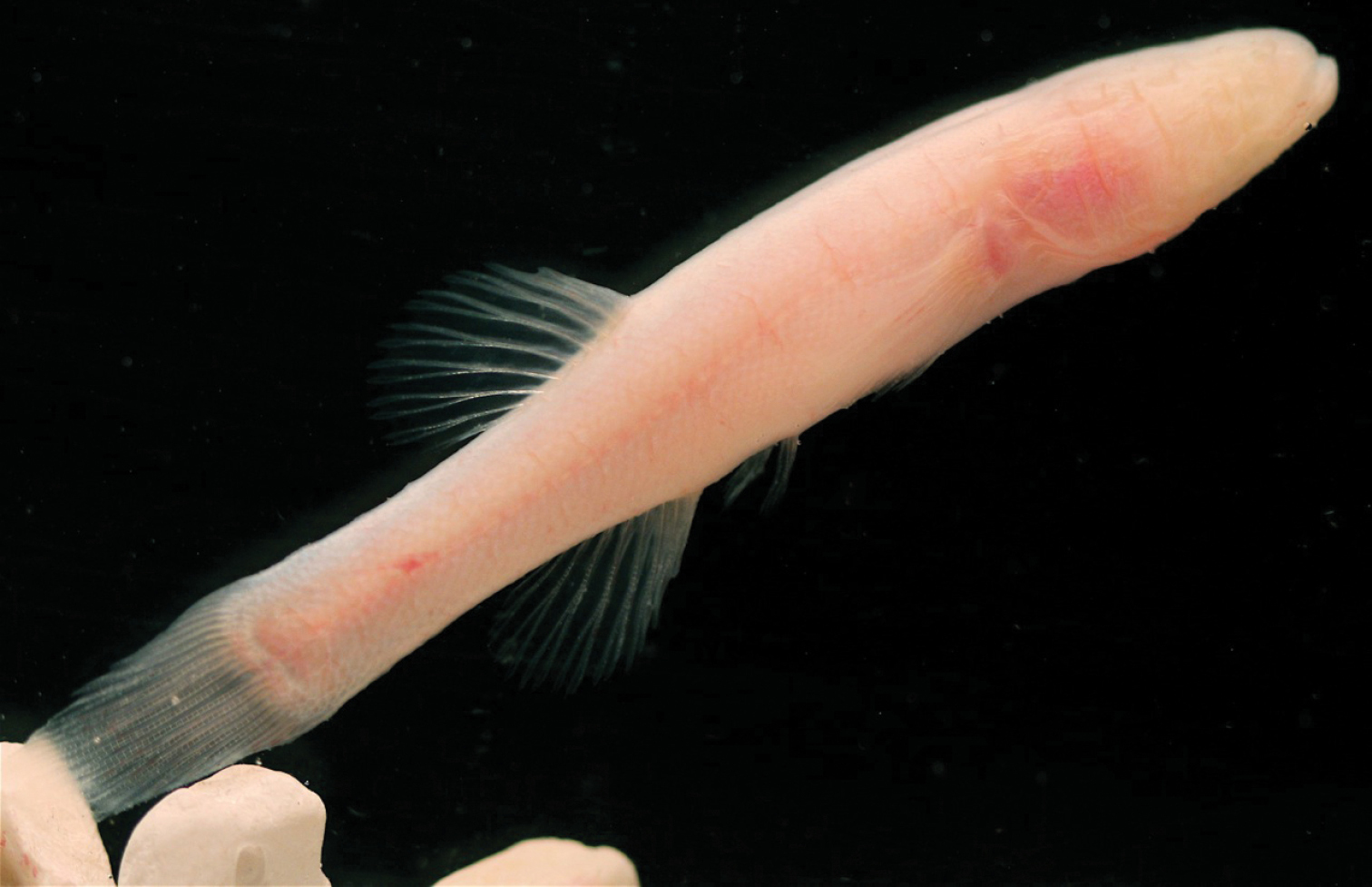
- A live specimen of A. hoosieri, measuring 60.7 millimetres (2.39 in) long.

Conservation status
- Imperiled (NatureServe)

Scientific classification
- Kingdom: Animalia
- Phylum: Chordata
- Class: Actinopterygii
- Division: Teleostei
- Order: Percopsiformes
- Family: Amblyopsidae
- Genus: Amblyopsis
- Species: A. hoosieri

Binomial name
- Amblyopsis hoosieri Niemiller, Prejean & Chakrabarty, 2014
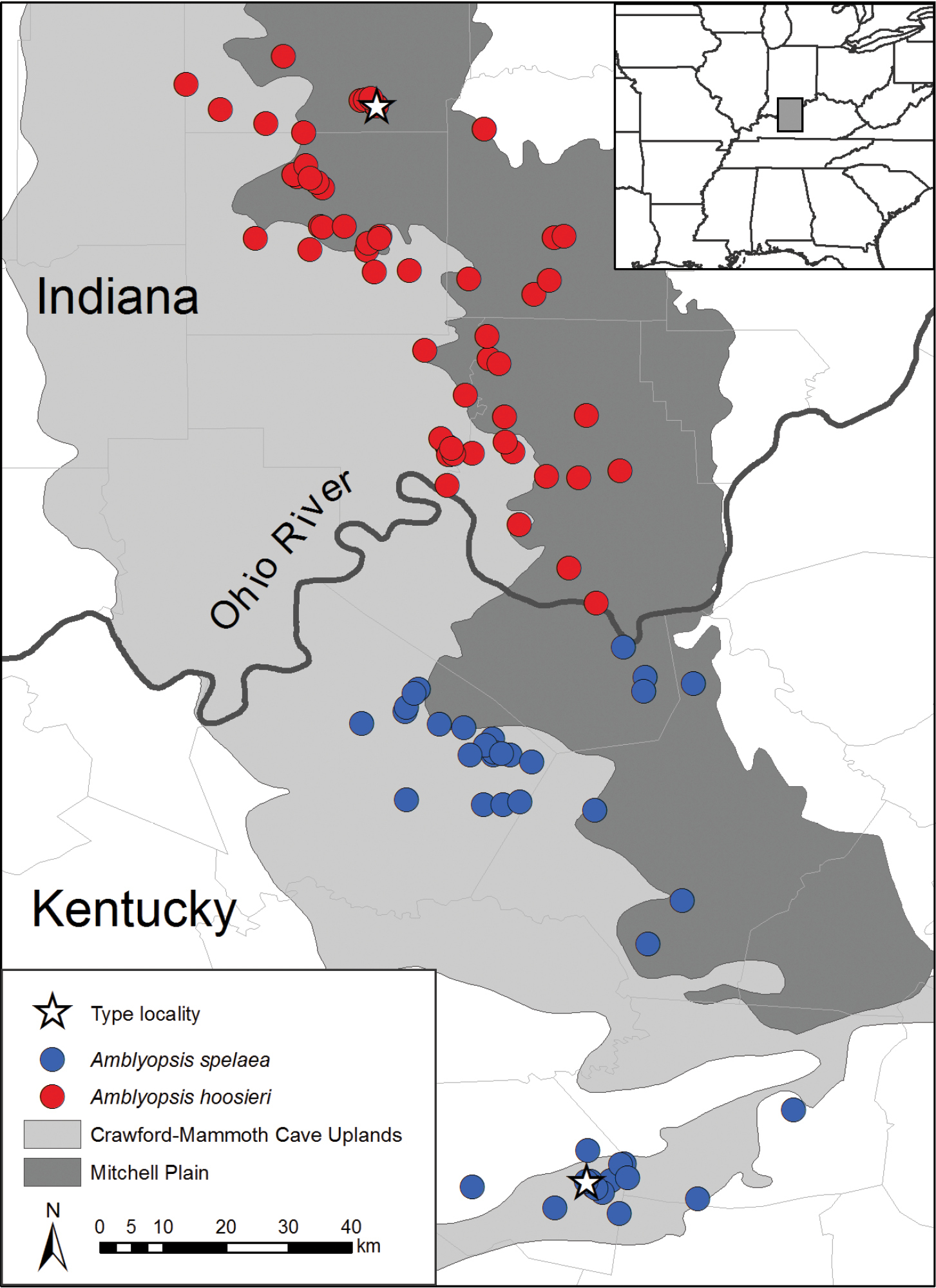
- Distribution in Indiana. The red dots are A. hoosieri, and the blue dots are A. spelaea

= Hoosier cavefish =

Species of fish

The Hoosier cavefish (Amblyopsis hoosieri) is a subterranean species of blind fish from southern Indiana in the United States. Described in 2014, A. hoosieri was the first new species of amblyopsid cavefish to be discovered in 40 years.

== Etymology ==
The specific name is derived from the word "Hoosier", the name for a resident of the state of Indiana. The choice of the name was also influenced by the fact that Prosanta Chakrabarty, the senior author of the paper that first described the species, was a fan of the Indiana Hoosiers college basketball team.

== Discovery ==
During a 2013 study of Amblyopsis spelaea, scientists found that the species was divided into two distinct evolutionary lineages: one north of the Ohio River, in Indiana, and one south of the river, in Kentucky. The northern population was described as a new species in a 2014 paper published in the journal ZooKeys, making it the first new species of amblyopsid cavefish to have been discovered in the U.S. in 40 years.

== Description ==
Average length is 6–8 centimetres (2.4–3.1 in). The head makes up approximately one quarter of its total length. As typical of cavefish, this species is blind. The lower jaw extends beyond the upper. The body is flattened dorsally, but robust, with short, rounded fins. The anus is located toward the front of the body, directly behind the gills.

General coloration is pinkish-white, with red around the gills. The fins are transparent.

== Reproduction and development ==
Breeding takes place between February and April, when the water levels are highest. Eggs are brooded in the females' gill cavity. After hatching, the females care for the young for 4–5 months. Individuals become sexually mature at 3–4 years of age. The species is suspected to have a lifespan of 12–15 years, but may live as long as 20 years.

== Diet ==
The species feeds on amphipods, copepods, isopods, and crayfish. It is believed to be the apex predator in its environment.

== Range and habitat ==
The subterranean A. hoosieri is distributed among 68 caves and 6 springs throughout Indiana, between the Ohio River and the East Fork of the White River. Its range is limited to those caves that were not covered by glaciers during the Pleistocene.

The Hoosier cavefish is usually found in pools in slow-flowing cave streams, in water that ranges from more than 2 metres (6.5 ft) deep to as shallow as 10 centimetres (4 in). Other species from the genus have been observed to prefer large, deep pools.

== Conservation status ==
The species is threatened by a number of factors: sedimentation from agriculture, human encroachment on its habitat, and groundwater pollution by herbicides, pesticides, and fertilizer. The species may also have been affected by over-collection of samples for scientific study during the late nineteenth and early twentieth centuries. Due to these factors, the authors recommended that the species be classified as vulnerable on the IUCN Red List.

The Hoosier cavefish is known to occur in the protected Spring Mill State Park. The state of Indiana also has policies in place to protect species of Amblyopsis.
