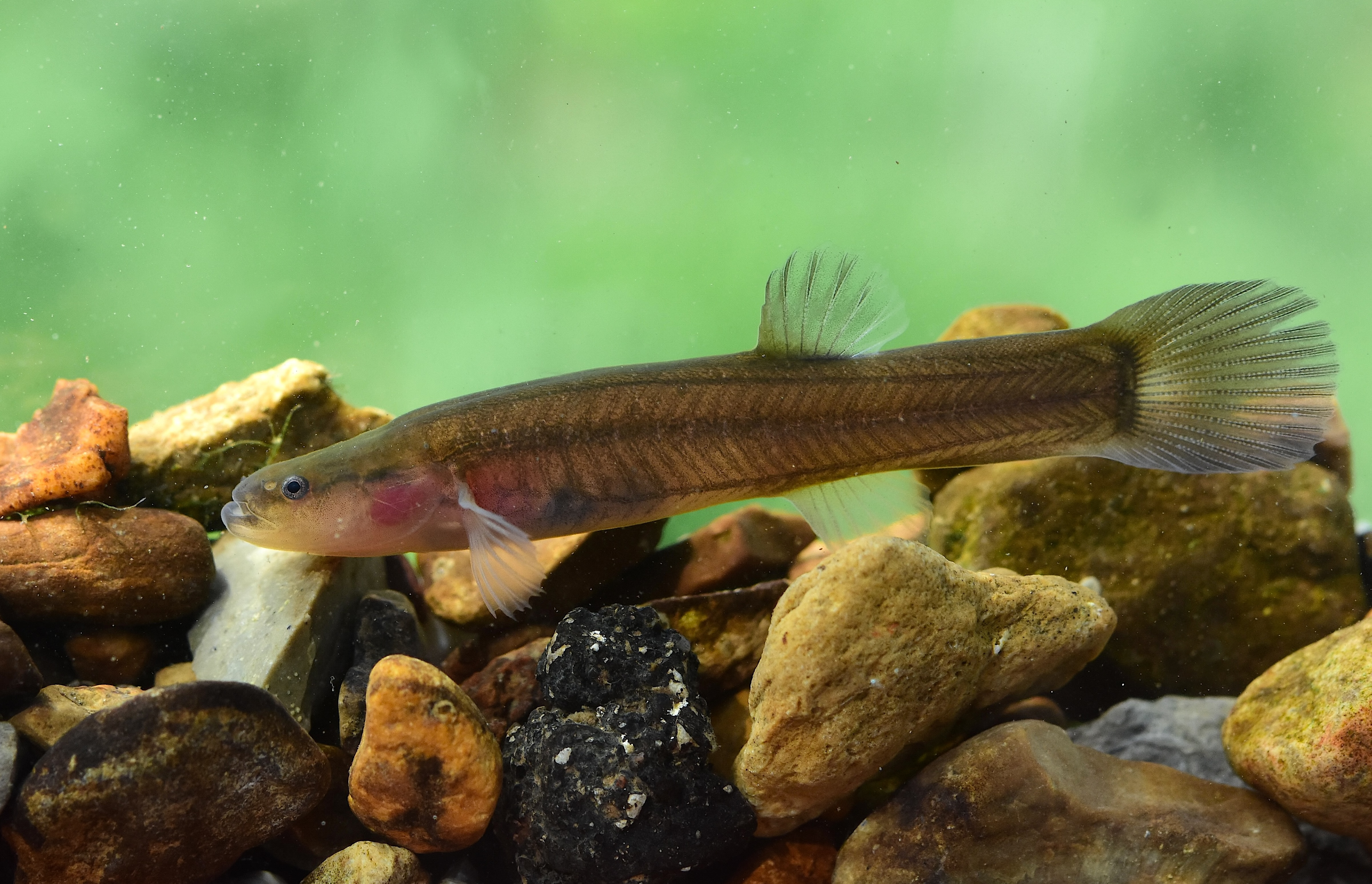

Conservation status
- Least Concern (IUCN 3.1)

Scientific classification
- Kingdom: Animalia
- Phylum: Chordata
- Class: Actinopterygii
- Order: Percopsiformes
- Family: Amblyopsidae
- Genus: Forbesichthys
- Species: F. agassizii

Binomial name
- Forbesichthys agassizii (Putnam, 1872)

Synonyms
- Chologaster agassizii Putnam, 1872

= Spring cavefish =

Species of fish

The spring cavefish (Forbesichthys agassizii) is a member of the genus Forbesichthys and is one of seven species in the family Amblyopsidae. This species is listed as least concern by the IUCN Red List due to its relatively large population size and number of subpopulations. The spring cavefish inhabits caves, springs, spring runs, and spring seeps. It is subterranean, emerging at dusk and retreating underground an hour or two before dawn. The species is located within areas of the central and southeastern United States. It stays underground after dawn, but then emerges into surface waters at dusk. They are a carnivorous fish and are well adapted to their environment. The species' breeding behavior is rarely documented. Spawning occurs underground and in darkness between January and April. The status and distribution of cave-obligate species is incomplete or lacking entirely, which makes conservation and management decisions difficult. Kentucky and Missouri are the two main states that have their agencies managing this species in some way.

== Geographic distribution ==
Originally found in a deep well in Lebanon, Tennessee, the spring cavefish is distributed within the central and southeastern United States. It inhabits select springs, spring runs/seeps, and caves from central and western Kentucky, west towards the Tennessee River, to south central Tennessee. It also is located in areas west across southern Illinois to southeastern Missouri.

The spring cavefish's distribution has decreased from within its original streams and springs. This species is affected by the activities on the surface of the ground. Any activity that reduces water quality or quantity affects the spring cavefish. It is vulnerable to pollution from many different sources. Some of these sources include nearby agricultural fields, pastures, septic tanks, sewage lagoons, urban runoff, mines, and livestock waste. Some of the springs fluctuate drastically in flow and turbidity as a result of direct connections with surface drainage or they were enclosed as water supplies or otherwise modified by man.

== Ecology ==
Spring cavefish stay underground after dawn, but then emerge into surface waters at dusk. They are dark brown dorsally and fade to a creamy brown towards the pelvis and reach a maximum length of 3.5 in (8.9 cm). The head is sloped, and it has a protruding lower jaw. The fish has no pelvic fin or adipose fin. Its dorsal fin is set further back compared to most fish. This species is susceptible to developing retinoblastomas.

The spring cavefish is well adapted to its environment, as it has a well-developed sensory system. This system occurs in clusters on the head. Most fish detect food by sight, taste, touch, or smell, or by a combination of these senses. Sight is important in the detection of food by most species, but this is presumably excluded with the slightly blind spring cavefish. They use their underdeveloped eyes to distinguish between light and darkness. However, spring cavefish cannot readily distinguish between edible and inedible substances by touch alone, but once in contact with the lips, the sense of taste enables the fish to distinguish among these items.

Another hurdle for this species is food is often lacking in their habitats, so they compensate for this scarcity of food with cannibalistic behavior. Cannibalism in the spring cavefish presumably serves two purposes: it enables the adults to survive in an environment where food is the principal limiting factor, and it serves as a means of population control. The spring cavefish can be considered its own predator, because of the cannibalism behavior and the lack of natural predators within the caves. However, they eat a wide range of insects, small crustaceans, smaller fish, and some detritus.

Cave environments provide a relatively stable habitat in terms of temperature fluctuations. However, the different species living in caves are reliant on food being brought to them by underground streams. This makes spring cavefish highly vulnerable to external factors as subterranean aquifers are becoming increasingly tapped for irrigation purposes, and many sites may be at risk from drying out either temporarily or permanently.

== Life history ==
The breeding behavior of spring cavefish is sparsely documented. Spawning occurs underground and in darkness between January and April. Spring cavefish are oviparous; however, the eggs are carried in gill chambers of the females. Females produce roughly 100 young per female. The average spring cavefish lives for about three years and typically reaches a length of about 1.8 to 2.6 inches (4.6 to 6.6 cm).

== Conservation ==
The status and distribution of cave-obligate species is incomplete or lacking entirely, which makes conservation and management decisions difficult. This species is listed as endangered in Missouri. The IUCN Red List considers the spring cavefish to be of least concern due to its relatively large population size and number of subpopulations. This species is declining, but many of the reasons are unknown. The Kentucky Department of Fish and Wildlife Resources is proposing to investigate the status, distribution, ecology, phylogenetic relationships, and threats to populations of three cave-associated fishes in the family Amblyopsidae in Kentucky. Kentucky and Missouri are the two main states with agencies managing this species in some way. Missouri has purchased Cape LaCroix Bluffs Conservation Area to provide habitat for the state endangered spring cavefish. This 63.21-acre (0.1 mi^{2}) area supports natural wetlands, limestone bluffs, and beech mesophytic forests unique to eastern Missouri.

Kentucky Department of Fish and Wildlife Resources has suggested the following sampling methods and actions to adequately monitor the spring cavefish species. The first recommendation is to conduct baseline surveys and status assessments for the species to determine the distribution of each species within the target state. It is also suggested to conduct baseline surveys for non-target cave-dwelling fauna to determine distribution and community associations and collect/preserve specimens and tissue samples of non-target cave-dwelling fauna for future genetic analyses. Secondly, they recommend conducting life history studies to obtain basic information. This includes habitat requirements, ecology, and population dynamics of the species and the area. Thirdly, it is recommended to identify potential threats to existing populations. Fourthly, it is recommended to develop management steps for each status evaluation and monitoring for this particular species. Kentucky also suggests collecting and preserving specimens with tissue samples of the species for genetic analyses to resolve any taxonomic statuses of questionable populations. This will allow one to examine the extent of gene flow among populations both within and between hydrologic drainages in the future. Both sets of recommendations are being used and experimented with in Kentucky and Missouri that currently have good spring programs.
