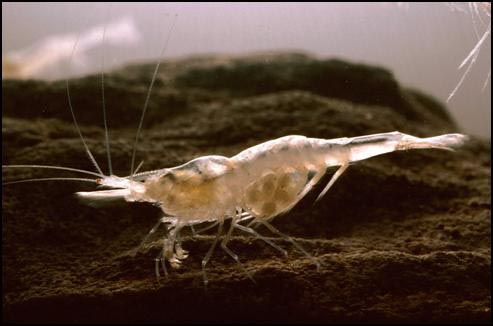
- Kentucky cave shrimp (Palaemonias ganteri)

Scientific classification
- Kingdom: Animalia
- Phylum: Arthropoda
- Class: Malacostraca
- Order: Decapoda
- Suborder: Pleocyemata
- Infraorder: Caridea
- Family: Atyidae
- Genus: Palaemonias; Hay, 1901

= Palaemonias =

Genus of crustaceans

The genus Palaemonias comprises two species of endangered, albinistic, obligate cave shrimp:

- Alabama cave shrimp – Palaemonias alabamae Smalley, 1961
- Kentucky cave shrimp – Palaemonias ganteri Hay, 1901
