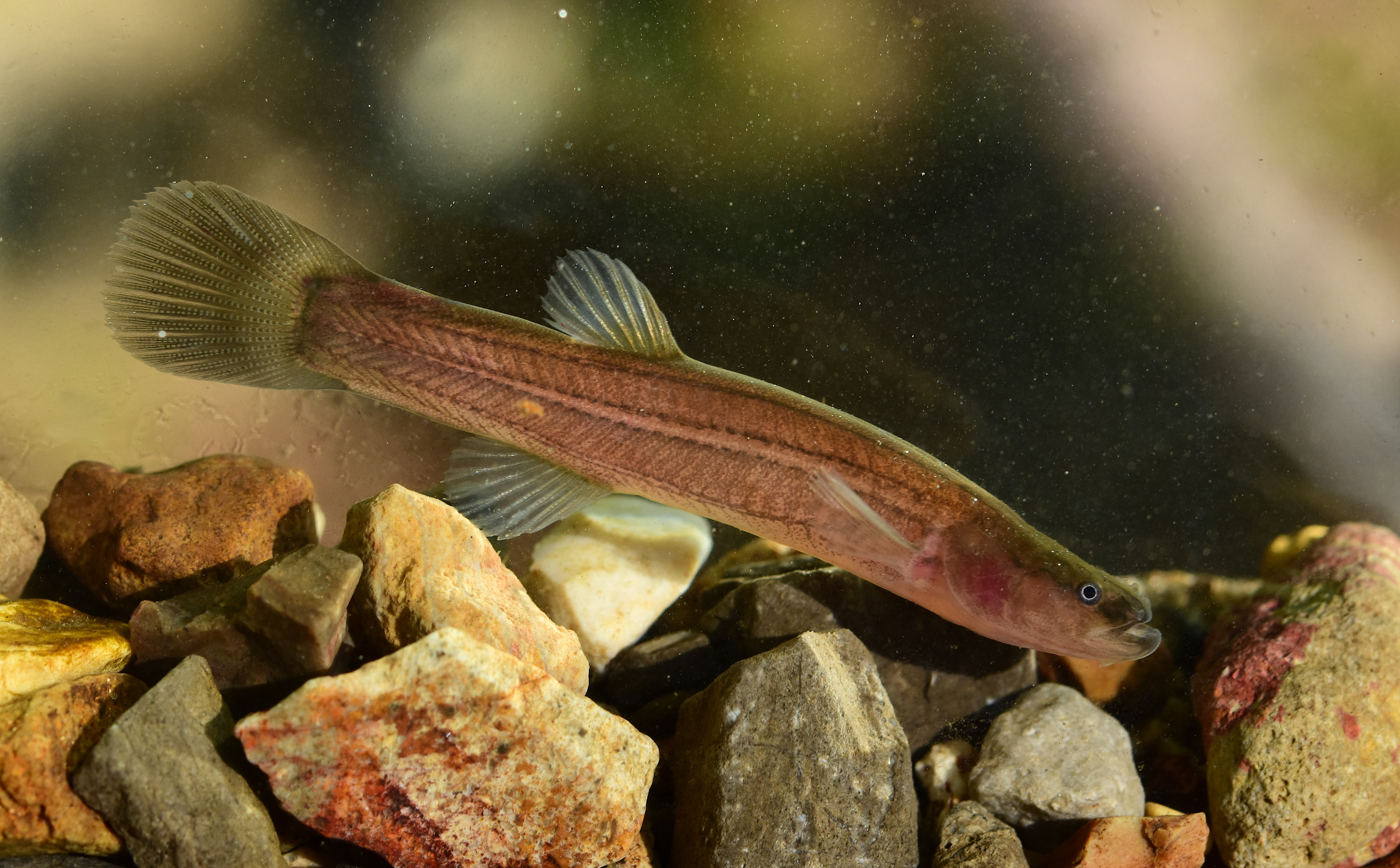
- Forbesichthys papilliferus

Scientific classification
- Kingdom: Animalia
- Phylum: Chordata
- Class: Actinopterygii
- Order: Percopsiformes
- Family: Amblyopsidae
- Genus: Forbesichthys; Jordan, 1929

Synonyms
- Forbesella Jordan & Evermann, 1927

= Forbesichthys =

Genus of fishes

Forbesichthys is a small genus of fishes native to North America, with two recognized species:

- Forbesichthys agassizii (Putnam, 1872) (spring cavefish)
- Forbesichthys papilliferus (Forbes, 1882) (Shawnee Hills cavefish)

Despite being cave fish, both species are non-troglomorphic, retaining functioning eyes and pigmented bodies. This is because they venture out from their subterranean habitat to feed in surface waters at night.
