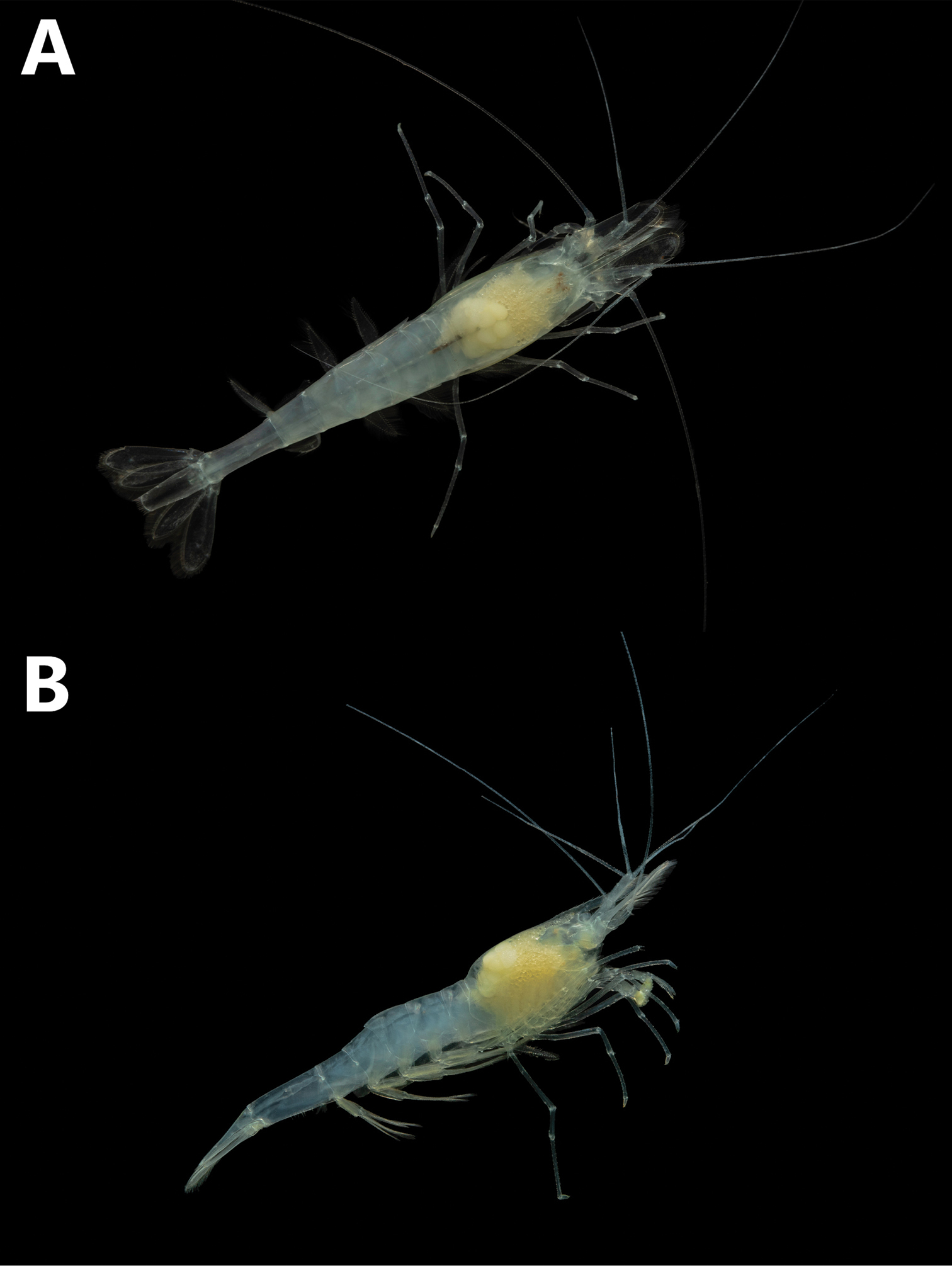

Conservation status
- Endangered (IUCN 3.1)

Scientific classification
- Kingdom: Animalia
- Phylum: Arthropoda
- Clade: Pancrustacea
- Class: Malacostraca
- Order: Decapoda
- Suborder: Pleocyemata
- Infraorder: Caridea
- Family: Atyidae
- Genus: Palaemonias
- Species: P. alabamae

Binomial name
- Palaemonias alabamae (Smalley, 1961)

= Alabama cave shrimp =

Species of crustacean

The Alabama cave shrimp (Palaemonias alabamae) is a species of shrimp that belongs to the family Atyidae.

== Distribution ==
The Alabama cave shrimp can be found in caves located in Madison County and Morgan County, Alabama, including Shelta Cave (the species type locality), Bobcat Cave, Muddy Cave and the complex that comprises Hering Cave, Glover Cave and Brazelton Cave. A population occurring on the south side of the Tennessee River Valley in Cave Spring Cave was discovered during a biosurvey in February of 2025.

== Ecology ==
Little is known about the habitat requirements of the Alabama cave shrimp and current knowledge is primarily based on observations of populations from Shelta and Bobcat Caves. This is made difficult by the dynamic nature of cave habitats and few observations from other caves this species inhabits. This species occurs in cave pools with silty bottoms. This seems to be backed up by populations of this species being discovered in Muddy Cave which has similar conditions.

They feed by filtering bottom sediments through their mouthparts.

=== Predators ===
Predators of the Alabama cave shrimp include the southern cavefish (Typhlichthys subterraneus) which is the only known predator in Shelta Cave and various troglobitic crayfish species. Amphibians such as the Tennessee cave salamander (Gyrinophilus palleucus) and bullfrogs have been seen predating on this species along with unidentified salamander species. Raccoons (Procyon lotor) have also been seen preying on this species.

== Taxonomy ==
The closest relative of the Alabama cave shrimp is the Kentucky cave shrimp (Palaemonias ganteri) which lives in Mammoth Cave National Park, Kentucky. The two species can be distinguished by size with the Kentucky cave shrimp being larger than the Alabama cave shrimp. This species possesses a longer rostrum and a greater number of spines on its rostrum.

== Conservation status ==
The Alabama cave shrimp is listed as an endangered species both on the IUCN Red List and under the U.S. Endangered Species Act of 1973 since September 7, 1988.

=== Population stability ===
While populations in Shelta Cave have not been sighted since the early 1970s, this species population levels in the rest of its range seem to be low but stable. The largest known population of the Alabama cave shrimp is in Bobcat cave while the species population levels and stability in Muddy Cave are unknown.

=== Threats ===
==== Physical threats and urbanization ====
Physical destruction of the caves are a threat to this species. This includes the closing off of cave entrances, sinkholes or the dumping of trash into the caves. Alterations of the caves drainage and hydrological patterns such as lowering groundwater levels also present a threat to this species. Urbanization of the land surrounding the caves this species inhabits is another threat. Urbanization causes contamination from sewage leakages, road and highway runoff’s, toxic spills, pesticides, industrial contaminants, siltation and etc. The increase in population from urbanization also raises the demand for water in Alabama’s cities such as Huntsville. This has created severe water shortages in the recent years which has cause cities to build wells such as the Drake well. This well, which is located less than a kilometer (0.5 miles) away from Bobcat Cave, is capable of pumping 7,570 liters (2,000 gallons) or water per minute. This amount of water being used has the potential to lower the groundwater levels and the aquifers of Shelta and Bobcat Caves reducing the available habitat for the Alabama Cave Shrimp. Suburbanization has been occurring around the Keel Mountains near the caves of Hering, Glover and Brazelton. Forest clearing, house construction and sewage system hookups present a danger to populations of the Alabama cave shrimp in the region. Dangers from suburbanization include sewage leakage, lawn fertilizers, pesticides and an increase runoff from residential development. Large chicken farm also threaten the water quality of Hering Cave.

==== Water contamination ====
Another threat comes in the form of the groundwater being degraded or contaminated by toxins, sewage or an overabundance of nutrients. Pollutants can easily and rapidly, especially during storm events, enter aquifers and the caves this species inhabits from the surface. An example of pollutants making their way into caves is the detection of trichloroethylene (TCE) being detected in several groundwater monitoring wells nearby Bobcat Cave. Water samples from Shelta Cave has shown the presence of many contaminants such as cadmium, heptachoir, epoxide, dieldrin. The levels of cadmium is almost five times higher than the standard for drinking water. These anomalous levels possibly originate from industrial and municipal sources and it, along with other contaminants, may have been responsible for the habitat degradation of Shelta Cave. Heptachoir, epoxide and dieldrin are all pesticides known to be externally toxic to aquatic life and, along with cadmium, present a danger to bioaccumulation in the food web. This is a concern because, even at low levels, they can be long-lived and accumulate rather than degrade.

==== Other factors ====
Predation and disease also play a role in threatening this species. The low population levels of the Alabama cave shrimp in each cave they inhabit means that they can be subject to over-utilization for commercial, recreational, educational and scientific purposes. Other similar species also have low reproductive rates which significantly impacts the species ability to recover from population loss. Their ability to recover loss would also be hindered by predation.
