= Orconectes barri =

Conservation status
- Data Deficient (IUCN 3.1)

- Imperiled (NatureServe)

Scientific classification
- Kingdom: Animalia
- Phylum: Arthropoda
- Class: Malacostraca
- Order: Decapoda
- Suborder: Pleocyemata
- Family: Cambaridae
- Genus: Orconectes
- Species: O. barri

Binomial name
- Orconectes barri Buhay & Crandall, 2008

Species of crayfish

Orconectes barri, the Cumberland Plateau cave crayfish, is a species of crayfish in the family Cambaridae. It is native to Kentucky and Tennessee in the United States, where it is found in nine caves on the Cumberland Plateau.
