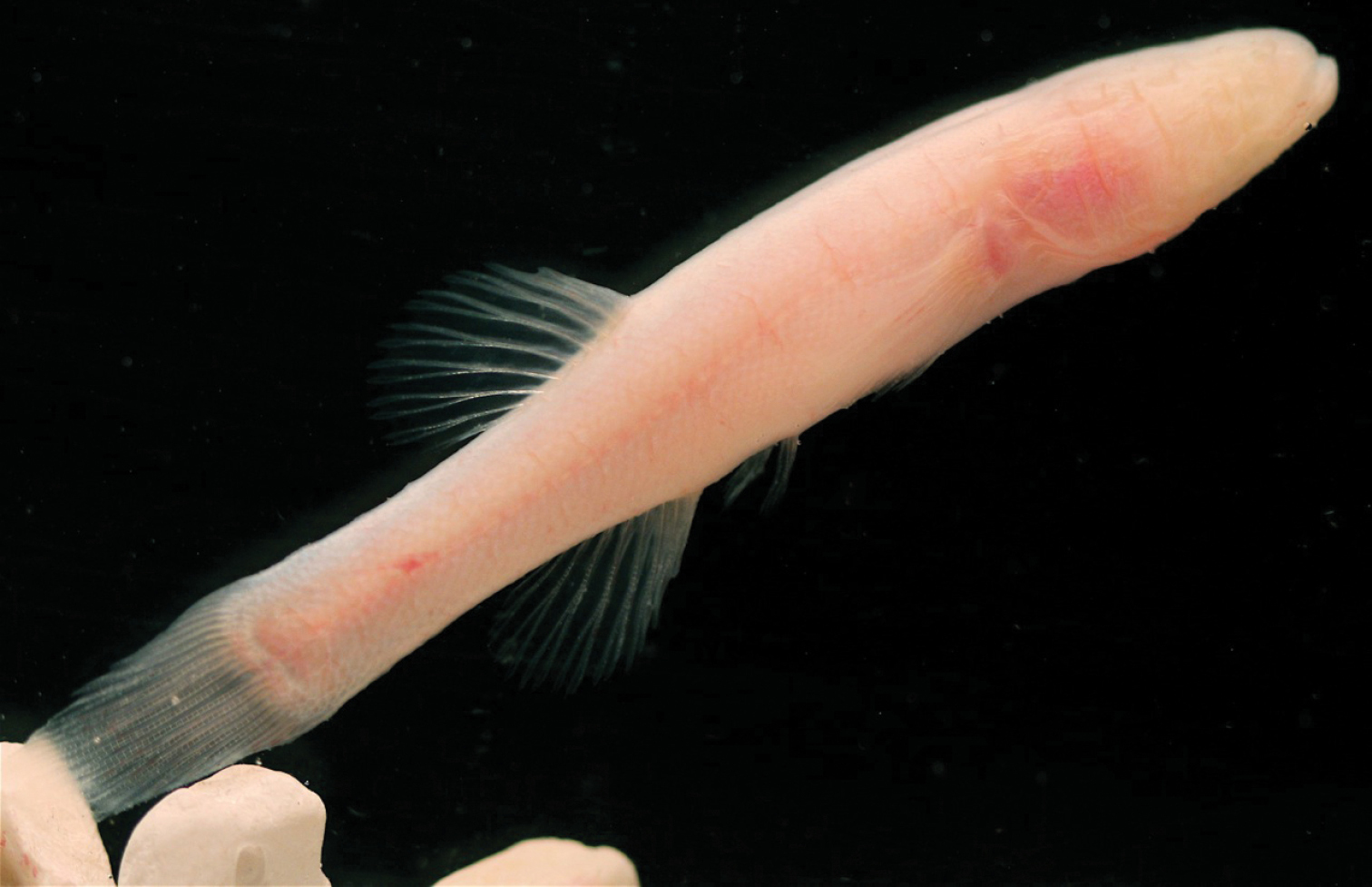
- Hoosier cavefish, Amblyopsis hoosieri

Scientific classification
- Kingdom: Animalia
- Phylum: Chordata
- Class: Actinopterygii
- Division: Teleostei
- Order: Percopsiformes
- Family: Amblyopsidae; Bonaparte, 1846

Genera
- Amblyopsis; Chologaster; Demogorgonichthys; Forbesichthys; Speoplatyrhinus; Troglichthys; Typhlichthys

= Amblyopsidae =

Family of fishes

The Amblyopsidae are a fish family commonly referred to as cavefish, blindfish, or swampfish. They are small freshwater fish found in the dark environments of caves (underground lakes, pools, rivers and streams), springs and swamps in the eastern half of the United States. Like other troglobites, most amblyopsids exhibit adaptations to these dark environments, including the lack of functional eyes and the absence of pigmentation. More than 200 species of cavefishes are known, but only six of these are in the family Amblyopsidae. One of these, Forbesichthys agassizii, spends time both underground and aboveground. A seventh species in this family, Chologaster cornuta, is not a cave-dweller but lives in aboveground swamps.

== Description ==
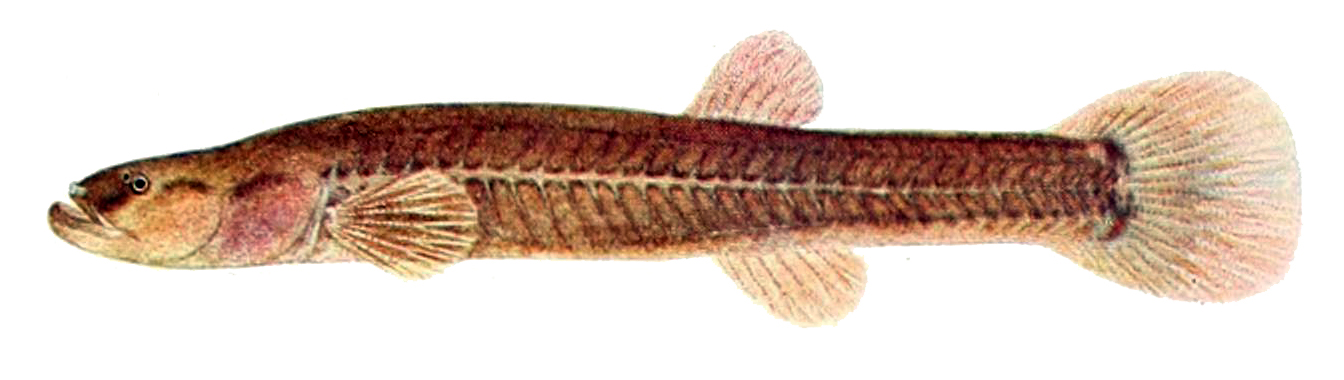
The spring cavefish (Forbesichthys agassizii) spends some time aboveground and its adaptions to an underground habitat are not as extreme as most species in the family

Amblyopsids are generally small, the northern cavefish (largest species in family) reaching up to 11 cm (4.3 in) in length.

The amblyopsids are probably ancient in origin. Adaptations common to many cavefish include reduced susceptibility to light, pigment loss, or reduction in skin scales, as well as development of chemoreceptors in the sensory organs of the body surface and the lateral line. Three species exhibit efficient metabolism during swimming, as compared with a group of non-cave fish, and many cavefish species exhibit slender bodies adapted to swimming in fast-flowing waters.

The cave-dwellers typically lack pigment and are somewhat translucent. They have a naked, moderately depressed head and an elongated body, covered with small cycloid irregular flakes, with tiny or absent pelvic fins. The anal opening is so far forward that it is in the throat region.

The premaxilla, a bone of the upper jaw, is segmented, and the vomer has no teeth. They have no ventral fins. The lateral line is incomplete, but well developed in some species. Its spine has between 27 and 35 vertebrae.

Externally, they resemble killifishes in many respects, although their internal anatomy more closely resembles the trout-perches, with which they are currently classified.

=== Eyes ===
The name of the family, Amblyopsidae, refers to their eyes (compare amblyopia). Most in this family are either blind or can only detect the difference between light and darkness. The true cave-dwellers have only rudimentary eyes, like so many other fauna that live in the dark.

Although some cave-dwellers have tiny, vestigial but functional eyes, others, such as the Amblyopsis and Typhlichthys have no eyes at all. Blindfish do, however, have rows of sensory papillae on their skin, which they use to help navigate.

Similar darkness-adaptive traits can be seen in many fish families where members live underground and is known as convergent evolution.

== Distribution ==
All members of this family are small and typical of the fresh waters of the eastern and southern regions of the United States. Some live deep in the swamps, and others in the lakes and streams or in caves, significantly the Kentucky cave system called the Mammoth caves.

Cavefish can only be found in caves that have streams running into them; a cave with no inlets does not contain cavefish.

== Ecology ==
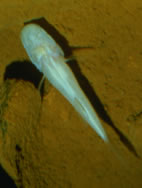
The Alabama cavefish (Speoplatyrhinus poulsoni) has a tiny range and is very rare

Although the cave habitat generally offers a poor food supply, the advantages of the environment include extremely stable conditions, few competitors, and few predators.

Since the cave environment is dark, no plant life is performing photosynthesis, and food is mainly introduced from the outside world by other organisms. Limited food leads to low population density, which has been estimated for Amblyopsidae to be only about 0.005 to 0.150 animals per square meter.

Cave habitats are vulnerable to changes in the environment such as water pollution and exotic species. The Alabama cavefish (Speoplatyrhinus poulsoni), which live only in the Key Cave in Alabama, is listed as Critically Endangered by the IUCN, the highest risk class.

== Life history and behavior ==
Cavefish breed only once a year, occupying about 10% of the population. Members of the family Amblyopsidae lay eggs. Uniquely among fish, the genus Amblyopsis brood their eggs in the gill chambers (somewhat like mouthbrooders). Formerly it was incorrectly speculated that a similar brooding behavior existed in other members of this family, as well as the pirate perch (Aphredoderus sayanus). Cavefish protect their eggs for the longest period of any fish.

A rare feature of this family is the forward placement of its cloaca, under the head, anterior to the pelvic fins. This placement allows the females to place their eggs more precisely, and is present also in other species of the Percopsiformes order, such as the Aphredoderidae. They feed on shrimp, gammarus, and arachnids that fall into the water, using vibrations and current changes to seek out their prey.

== See also ==
- Troglofauna
