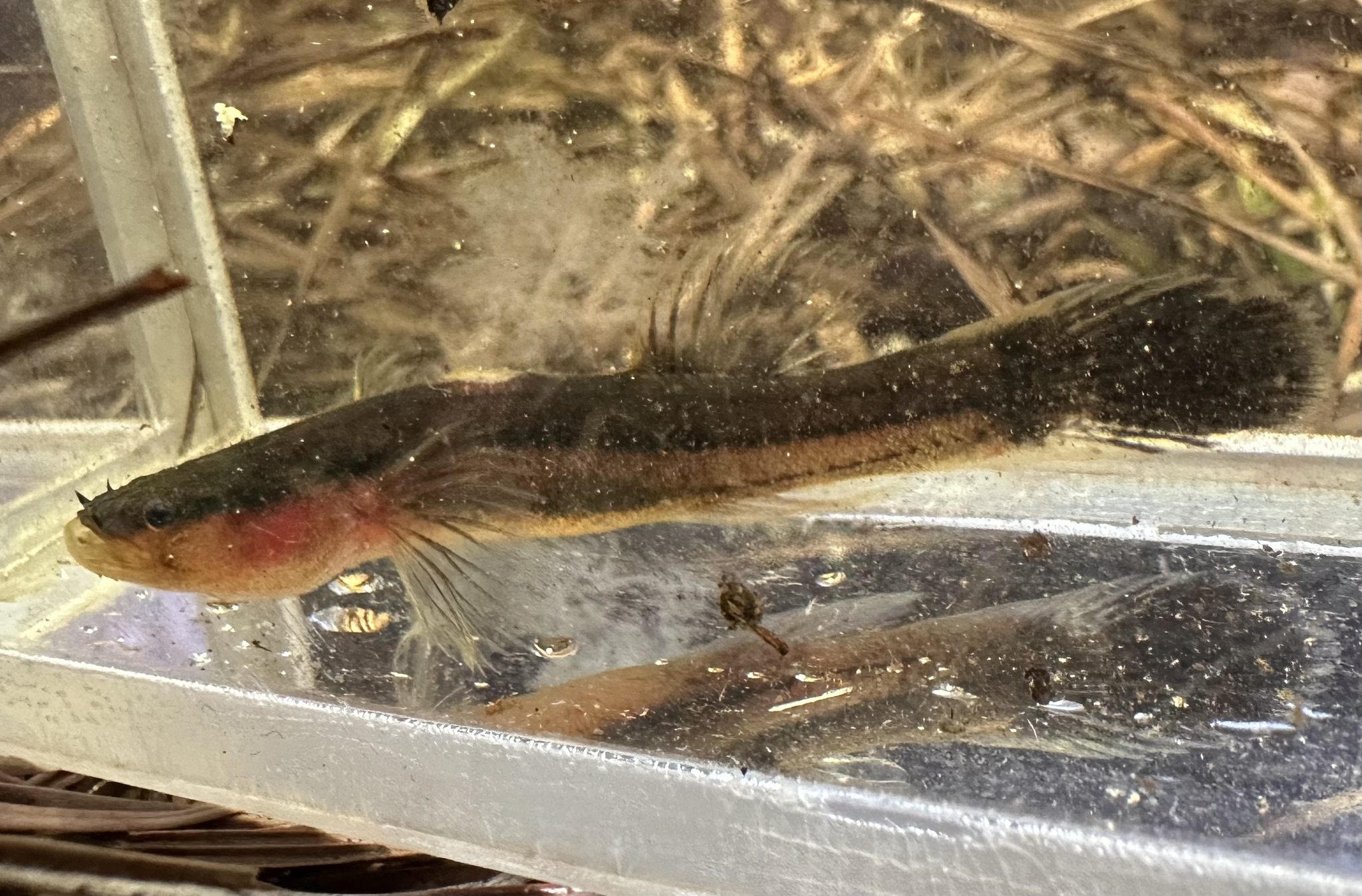

Conservation status
- Least Concern (IUCN 3.1)

Scientific classification
- Kingdom: Animalia
- Phylum: Chordata
- Class: Actinopterygii
- Order: Percopsiformes
- Family: Amblyopsidae
- Genus: Chologaster; Agassiz, 1853
- Species: C. cornuta

Binomial name
- Chologaster cornuta Agassiz, 1853

Synonyms
- Chologaster cornutus Agassiz, 1853; Chologaster avitus Jordan & Jenkins in Jordan, 1889

= Chologaster =

Species of fish

Chologaster cornuta, commonly named swampfish, ricefish, or riceditch killifish, is a freshwater fish of the family Amblyopsidae. It is the only living species of the genus Chologaster. It only lives in US rivers in the Atlantic Coastal Plain drainages, from southeast Virginia to central Georgia. It lives up to two years. The Latin name refers to a very tiny horned bulge at front of the eye. They are commonly 4 cm (1.6 in) long, but may reach about 6.8 cm (2.7 in).

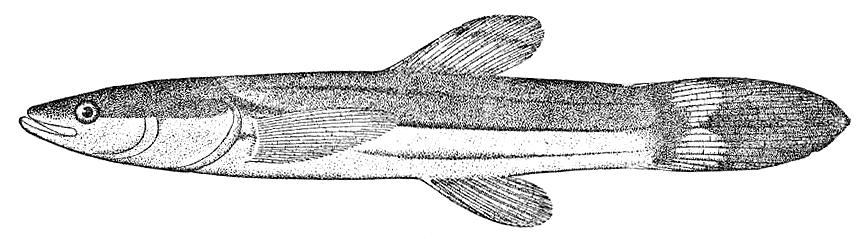
1907 illustration

== Characteristics ==
This species is part of the family Amblyopsidae (typically known as cavefish or blindfish). It is dorsally brown and ventrally creamy white, with three dark stripes on each side. It inhabits above-ground swamps, rather than caves as most other species in its family. Although many Amblyopsidae species have vestigial eyes, the swampfish has functional eyes.

== Behavior ==
Chologaster cornuta feeds mostly at night, on small crustaceans and aquatic insects. It spawns in March and April. Although locally common, individuals are hard to spot because they are largely nocturnal and found in heavily vegetated waters. They are highly sensitive to touch and light, and will quickly move away from a source of either, hiding on the bottom until dark. Its thigmotaxic tendency is shown by the difficulty in seining it from the roots and debris of its preferred habitat along edges of submerged weed banks which border sand-bottomed channels.

This fish is found over vegetation and debris in swamps, sloughs, and quiet pools and backwaters of streams. They prefer highly oxygenated water and have a high temperature tolerance. They are found year-round in small and well-shaded open streams, where temperatures don't exceed 23 °C (73 °F). This habitat is rich in potential food for C. cornuta, such as amphipods, ostracods, and copepods.
