= Orconectes inermis testii =

Conservation status
- Vulnerable (IUCN 2.3)

- Vulnerable (NatureServe)

Scientific classification
- Kingdom: Animalia
- Phylum: Arthropoda
- Class: Malacostraca
- Order: Decapoda
- Suborder: Pleocyemata
- Family: Cambaridae
- Genus: Orconectes
- Species: O. inermis
- Subspecies: O. i. testii

Trinomial name
- Orconectes inermis testii (Hay, 1891)

Subspecies of crayfish

Orconectes inermis testii, known as the unarmed crayfish, is one of two subspecies of the northern cave crayfish (Orconectes inermis), along with Orconectes inermis inermis.

== Distribution ==
It is endemic to Monroe County, Indiana in the United States, where it interbreeds to form intergrades with O. i. inermis.
