= Oliver Perry Hay =

American paleontologist

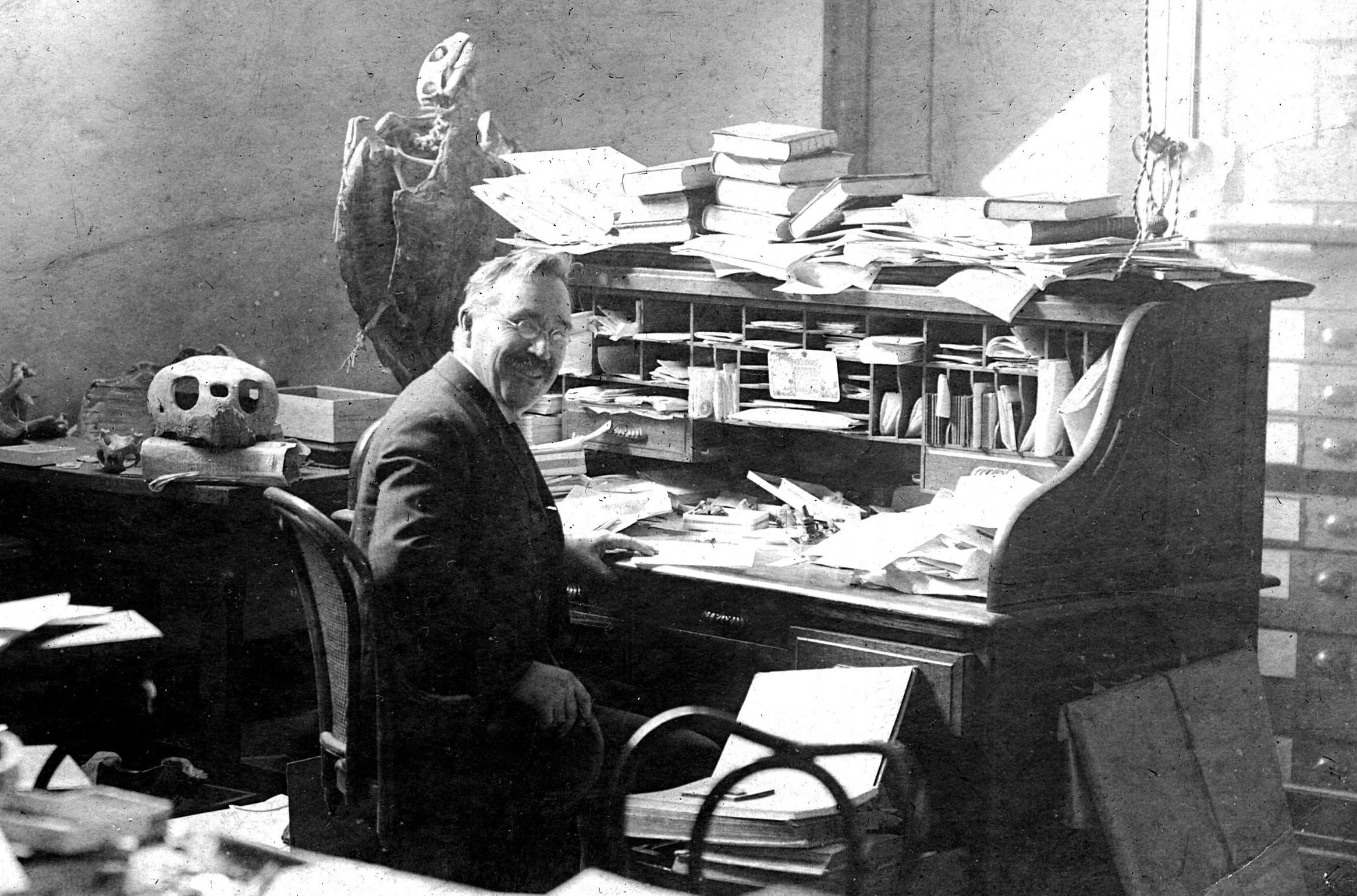
- Hay at his desk at the Carnegie Institution, circa 1920
- Born: May 22, 1846
- Died: November 2, 1930 (aged 84)
- Education: Eureka College (BA); Indiana University Bloomington (PhD)
- Scientific career
- Fields: Zoology; Paleontology
- Workplaces: Carnegie Institution for Science

Oliver Perry Hay (May 22, 1846 – November 2, 1930) was an American herpetologist, ichthyologist, and paleontologist.

Hay was born in Jefferson County, Indiana, to Robert and Margaret Hay. In 1870, Hay graduated with a bachelor of arts from Eureka College in Illinois. He taught at the college as a sciences professor from 1870 to 1873. He married Mary E. Howsmon of Eureka, Illinois, in 1870. He was a professor at Oskaloosa College in Iowa from 1874 to 1876. He was a student at Yale University from 1876 to 1877. Seventeen years after earning his bachelors, he earned his PhD from Indiana University Bloomington. From 1877 to 1879, he taught at Abingdon College just before it was incorporated into his alma mater, Eureka College. His longest professorship was at Butler University from 1879 to 1892. From 1894 to 1895, he worked at the Field Museum of Natural History as assistant curator of zoology, where despite his specialty in ichthyology, he worked in all nonornithological fields of zoology. In 1912, Hay was appointed as a research associate at the Carnegie Institution for Science, and was given office space at the United States National Museum. There, he did much work with the USNM's collections in vertebrate paleontology. He published extensively on fossil turtles and Pleistocene mammals. The catalogs that he constructed were a great aid in recording existing knowledge and became standard references. His papers from 1911 to 1930 are stored at the Smithsonian Institution.

Oliver and Mary had four children together. Their son, William Perry Hay, was also a zoologist.

== Works ==
Below is a partial list of Hay's work.

- Hay, Oliver Perry (1892). The Batrachians and Reptiles of Indiana. Original from the University of Michigan: Wm. B. Burford. p. 204 Pages. "Oliver Perry Hay."
- Hay, Oliver Perry (1896). Fieldiana Zoology. V.1, No.4. "On some collections of fishes made in the Kankakee and Illinois". Vol. 1. Chicago, IL: Field Museum of Natural History. pp. 85–97.
- Hay, Oliver Perry (1902). Bibliography and Catalogue of the Fossil Vertebrata of North America. Bulletin of the United States Geological Survey. Vol. 179. Govt. Print. Off. p. 868 pages. OCLC 681072233.
- Hay, Oliver Perry (1923). The Pleistocene of North America and Its Vertebrated Animals from the States East of the Mississippi River and from the Canadian Provinces East of Longitude 95.̊. Carnegie Institution of Washington. p. 499 pages. OCLC 595145229.
- Hay, Oliver Perry (1923). "Characteristics of sundry fossil vertebrates". Pan-American Geologist. 39: 101–120. OCLC 38855496.
