= Typhlichthys =

Scientific classification
- Kingdom: Animalia
- Phylum: Chordata
- Class: Actinopterygii
- Division: Teleostei
- Order: Percopsiformes
- Family: Amblyopsidae
- Genus: Typhlichthys; Girard, 1859

Genus of fishes

Typhlichthys is a small genus of troglomorphic cave fishes native to karst caves in eastern North America, with three recognized species:

- Typhlichthys eigenmanni Charlton, 1933 (Salem Plateau Cavefish)
- Typhlichthys subterraneus Girard, 1859 (Southern Cavefish)
- Typhlichthys styx Brownstein, Watkins-Colwell, Policarpo, Harrington, Hoffman, Casane, and Near 2026 (Phantom Cavefish)

Species in the genus are all obligate troglomorphs, and last share a common ancestor with other amblyopsids in the Miocene, between 8 and 15 million years ago
