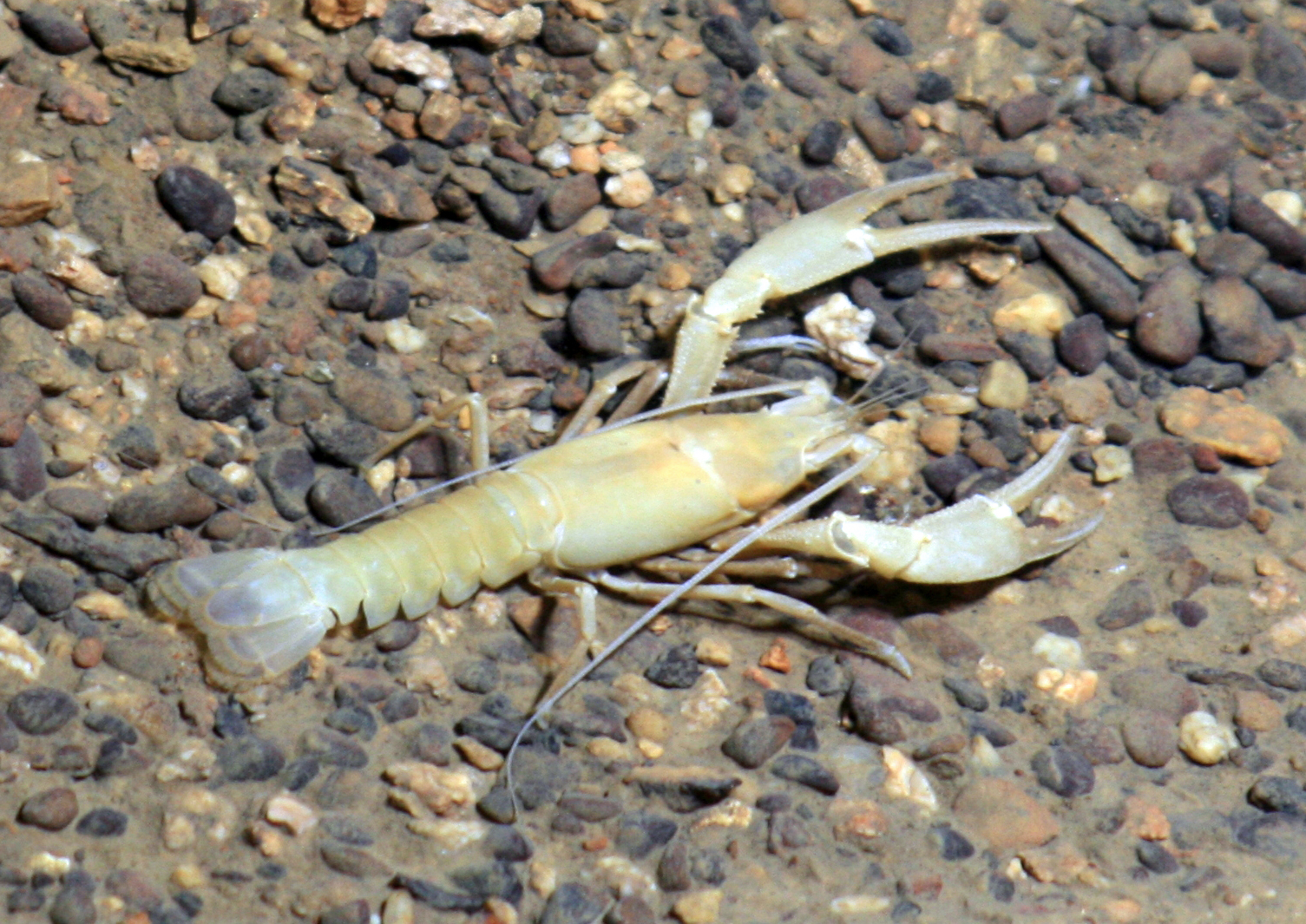
- O. pellucidus (Mammoth Cave, Kentucky, USA)

Conservation status
- Least Concern (IUCN 3.1)

- Apparently Secure (NatureServe)

Scientific classification
- Kingdom: Animalia
- Phylum: Arthropoda
- Class: Malacostraca
- Order: Decapoda
- Suborder: Pleocyemata
- Family: Cambaridae
- Genus: Orconectes
- Species: O. pellucidus

Binomial name
- Orconectes pellucidus (Tellkampf, 1844)

Synonyms
- Astacus pellucidus

= Orconectes pellucidus =

Species of crayfish

Orconectes pellucidus, the Mammoth Cave crayfish, is a freshwater crayfish native to karst landscapes in Kentucky and Tennessee in the United States.

The common name refers to the Mammoth Cave National Park, however it also occurs outside of the park. An alternative common name, the eyeless crayfish refers to its troglomorphic adaptions to its subterranean habitat.

Media related to Orconectes pellucidus at Wikimedia Commons
