= Orconectes stygocaneyi =

Conservation status
- Least Concern (IUCN 3.1)

- Critically Imperiled (NatureServe)

Scientific classification
- Kingdom: Animalia
- Phylum: Arthropoda
- Clade: Pancrustacea
- Class: Malacostraca
- Order: Decapoda
- Suborder: Pleocyemata
- Family: Cambaridae
- Genus: Orconectes
- Species: O. stygocaneyi

Binomial name
- Orconectes stygocaneyi Hobbs, 2001

Synonyms
- Faxonius stygocaneyi (Hobbs, 2001)

Species of crayfish

Orconectes stygocaneyi, the Caney Mountain cave crayfish (also called Faxonius stygocaneyi in some schemes) is a small, freshwater crayfish endemic to Missouri in the United States. It is a cave-dwelling species known from only one cave, Mud Cave in Ozark County, Missouri. This cave is Protected as part of the Caney Mountain Conservation Area, which covers 7,899 acres (3,197 ha) of public land administered by the Missouri Department of Conservation.

== Taxonomy ==
The species was described as Orconectes stygocaneyi Hobbs, 2001. It later appeared in an important catalog as Faxonius stygocaneyi (Hobbs, 2001), but genetic data later supported affinity genus Orconectes, and even with data from the 16S rRNA fragment as a close ally of its type species Orconectes inermis Cope, 1872.
