= Spinanycta =

- Female

Scientific classification
- Kingdom: Animalia
- Phylum: Arthropoda
- Clade: Pancrustacea
- Class: Insecta
- Order: Zygentoma
- Family: Nicoletiidae
- Family: Spinanycta; Espinasa, Gutierrez & Niemiller, 2024
- Species: S. alabamensis

Binomial name
- Spinanycta alabamensis Espinasa, Gutierrez & Niemiller, 2024

Genus of nicoletiid insects

Spinanycta is a genus of insects in the family Nicoletiidae. It is a monotypic genus consisting of only one species, Spinanycta alabamensis. It was described by Luis Espinasa, Abrianna Gutierrez, and Matthew L. Niemiller in 2024.

== Etymology ==
The name of the genus Spinanycta comes from the Greek words "spina" (spine), in reference to the distinctive spine, and "nycta" (night), in reference to the Greek goddess Nyx, who was known to occupy caves. The species name, alabamensis, refers to the state of Alabama in the United States, where the species was discovered.

== Description ==
The body of Spinanycta alabamensis is whitish-yellow in color, with the antennae measuring around 1.25 times the length of the body, and tails measuring around 0.75 times the length of the body. The stem of the antenna (the pedicel), is around half the length of the base of the antenna (the scape) in males, and slightly less than half in females. The male holotype measured 8.5 mm (0.33 in) in length. Males of Spinanycta alabamensis have a pointed spine along their sternum, which distinguishes the species from other members of Nicoletiidae.

== Distribution ==
The species is known to live in three cave systems in northern Alabama, those being Bobcat Cave in Madison County (the species' type locality), Muddy Cave in Madison County, and Rockhouse Cave in Limestone County.
