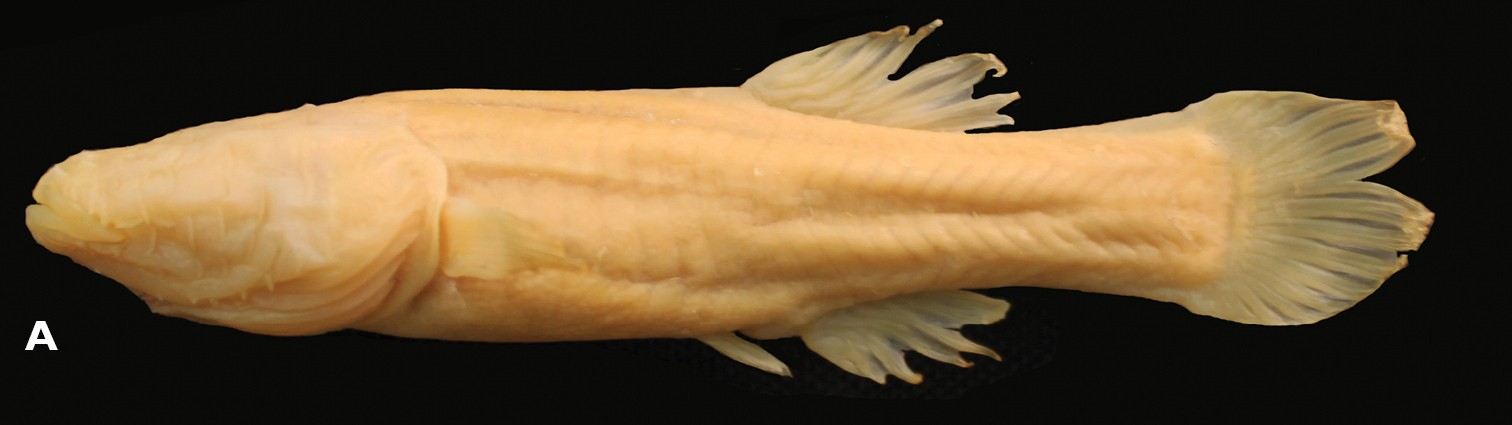
- Hoosier cavefish A. hoosieri
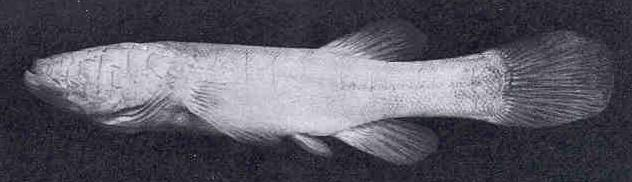
- Northern cavefish A. spelaea

Scientific classification
- Kingdom: Animalia
- Phylum: Chordata
- Class: Actinopterygii
- Order: Percopsiformes
- Family: Amblyopsidae
- Genus: Amblyopsis; DeKay, 1842

Type species
- Amblyopsis spelaeus DeKay, 1842

= Amblyopsis =

Genus of fishes

Amblyopsis is a genus of small (up to 11 cm or 4.3 in long) fish in the family Amblyopsidae that are endemic to the central and eastern United States. Like other cavefish, they lack pigmentation and are blind. The most recently described species was in 2014. Uniquely among fish, Amblyopsis brood their eggs in the gill chambers (somewhat like mouthbrooders). It was formerly incorrectly speculated that the same brooding behavior existed in other genera in the family and in the pirate perch (Aphredoderus sayanus). During the Pleistocene period, the modern Ohio river was a barrier of dispersal and created a great genetic variation, leading to two phylogenetically distinct lineages from the species Amblyopsis.

== Species ==
There are currently two species of this genus:

- Amblyopsis hoosieri Niemiller, Prejean & Chakrabarty, 2014 (Hoosier cavefish)
- Amblyopsis spelaea DeKay, 1842 (northern cavefish)
