= Orconectes inermis =

Northern cave crayfish

Conservation status
- Least Concern (IUCN 3.1)

- Secure (NatureServe)

Scientific classification
- Kingdom: Animalia
- Phylum: Arthropoda
- Class: Malacostraca
- Order: Decapoda
- Suborder: Pleocyemata
- Family: Cambaridae
- Genus: Orconectes
- Species: O. inermis

Binomial name
- Orconectes inermis (Cope, 1872)

Species of crayfish

Orconectes inermis, the Northern cave crayfish, is a troglomorphic freshwater crayfish native to Kentucky and Indiana in the United States.

There are two sub-species described;

- Orconectes inermis inermis, known as ghost grayfish
- Orconectes inermis testii (Hay, 1891), known as unarmed crayfish

The two sub-species are known to form intergrades in the range where they overlap.
