= Shelta Cave =

Cave in Alabama

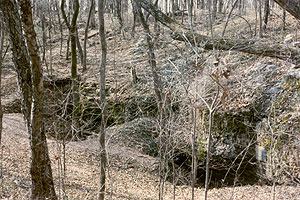
- Shelta Cave
- Location: Huntsville, Alabama, U.S.
- Area: 4 acres (1.6 ha)
- Established: 1967
- Governing body: National Speleological Society
- Website: www.caves.org/preserves/scp/shelta.html

U.S. National Natural Landmark
- Designated: October 1972

Shelta Cave is a 2,500-foot-long (760 m) cave and lake located in Huntsville, Madison County, Alabama, United States. It is described as one of the most bio-diverse caves within the Appalachian Mountains. The cave is currently owned and managed as a nature preserve by the National Speleological Society, with their main offices directly above the cave. It was declared a National Natural Landmark in October 1972.

== History ==
This cave was an underground bar and dance hall in the early 1900s.

== Speleology and wildlife ==
The cave is open to members of the NSS during certain times of the year to minimize the impact on the biome. There are now three sinkhole entrances. The lake can be as large as 7 acres (2.8 ha) during the winter and early spring rainy season. Other times of the year, the lake bed is exposed.

There are nine species which were first discovered in this cave. The Shelta Cave crayfish (Orconectes sheltae) is endemic to the cave. The Alabama cave shrimp (Palaemonias alabamae) can also be found here and is its type locality.

== Rediscovery ==
In May 2022, biologists led by Dr. Matthew L. Niemiller reported the rediscovery of the Shelta Cave crayfish (Orconectes sheltae) at Shelta Cave for the first time since 1988. They announced that 20 cave crayfish were discovered during 12 of 20 surveys between October 2018 and July 2021. Two of them were identified as Orconectes sheltae. The study demonstrated that the species is not yet extinct as past authors had assumed.
