= Key Cave National Wildlife Refuge =

National Wildlife Refuge

- IUCN category IV (habitat/species management area)
- Location within Alabama
- Location: Lauderdale County, Alabama, United States
- Nearest city: Florence, Alabama
- Coordinates: 34.75205°N 87.782478°W
- Area: 1,060 acres (430 ha)
- Established: 1997
- Visitors: 6000 (in 2005)
- Governing body: U.S. Fish and Wildlife Service
- Website: Key Cave NWR

Key Cave National Wildlife Refuge is a 1,060 acre (4.3 km^{2}) National Wildlife Refuge located in northwestern Alabama, along the Tennessee River downstream from Florence, Alabama. Additional purchases are under negotiation which will increase the size of the refuge to 1,800 acres (7.3 km^{2}).

More than 6,000 visitors per year visit the refuge. The facility is unstaffed, but is administered by the Wheeler National Wildlife Refuge in Decatur, Alabama.

== Topography ==
=== Caves ===
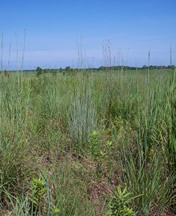
Key Cave NWR

Two caves, Key Cave and Collier Cave, lie within the refuge, approximately 1.5 miles (2.4 km) apart. Both caves are closed to the public. Each is on the northern shore of Pickwick Lake on the Tennessee River. The area also contains several sinkholes and cave systems, including a 38-acre (150,000 m^{2}) sinkhole lake. The sinkholes and cave systems provide a source of groundwater for the caves. The refuge is set up to minimize the pollution of this groundwater.

=== Land ===
The land suffers from severe erosion due to the extensive farming in the area. A restoration of the land to native warm season grasses and mixed hardwoods is underway in order to protect the cave groundwater area. Approximately 338 acres (1.4 km^{2}) of the land is used for corn and soybean production under a Cooperative Farm Agreement. Fields of warm season grasses such as big bluestem (Andropogon gerardi), little bluestem (Schizachyrium scoparium), Indiangrass (Sorghastrum nutans), sideoats grama (Bouteloua curtipendula), switchgrass (Panicum virgatum), and eastern gamagrass (Tripsacum dactyloides) cover 260 acres (1.1 km^{2}) of land. 122 acres (0.49 km^{2}) of hardwood forest has been planted to help control the erosion. There are an additional 30 acres (120,000 m^{2}) of erosion drainages which are being converted to grassland or hedgerow habitat, 16 acres (65,000 m^{2}) being used as shallow water areas, and 256 acres (1.04 km^{2}) of hardwood forests consisting primarily of oak and hickory trees.

== History ==
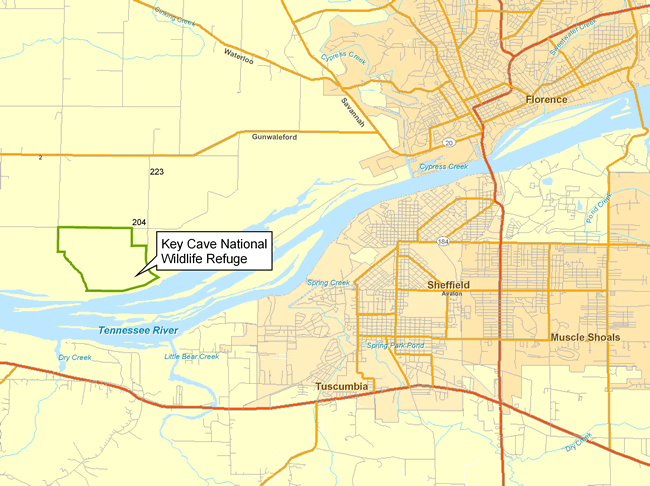
Map of Key Cave NWR

The land of the Key Cave NWR area has historically been used for agricultural purposes, primarily in farming cotton. The area receives its name from William Key, who owned the land the refuge now contains as well as a plantation house on nearby private property. An enslaved peoples' cemetery called "Key Cemetery" is located on the refuge.

In 1990, the Ozark Underground Laboratory tested the underground water table and determined that the area suffered from chemical pollution from nearby cotton, soybean, corn, and wheat farming operations. The Key Cave and Collier Cave share the same aquifer system which was being polluted as a result of the farming operations.

In 1992, the Monsanto Company sold the land in the highest hazard risk area to The Conservation Fund. This land was later sold to the U.S. Fish and Wildlife Service which established the Key Cave NWR on January 3, 1997.

== Wildlife ==
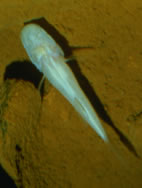
Alabama cavefish

Key Cave is a critical habitat for the endangered Alabama cavefish (Speoplatyrhinus poulsoni). Only 130 specimens have been observed over the 36 excursions to Key Cave between 1967 and 1998. The refuge also provides protection for approximately 40,000 endangered gray bats (Myotis grisescens). The cave is also home to two species of endangered crayfish: Phantom cave crayfish (Cambarus pecki) and Cambarus jonesi.

Key Cave NWR also manages several bird species including grasshopper sparrows (Ammodramus savannarum), dickcissels (Spiza americana), northern harriers (Circus cyaneus), short-eared owls (Asio flammeus), loggerhead shrikes (Lanius ludovicianus), and northern bobwhites (Colinus virginianus).

== Facilities ==
The refuge has 2.5 miles (4.0 km) of trails for hiking and cycling. Key Cave is not open to the public, but nearby viewing platforms facilitate the viewing of the bats during the summer. This is the #9 site on the North Alabama Birding Trail.

== See also ==
- List of National Wildlife Refuges
