= William Perry Hay =

American zoologist

William Perry Hay (born in Eureka, Illinois, on December 8, 1871; died in Bradenton, Florida, on January 26, 1947) was an American zoologist, naturalist, and educator known for his work on crayfish and reptiles.

Hay was the son of Oliver Perry Hay.
