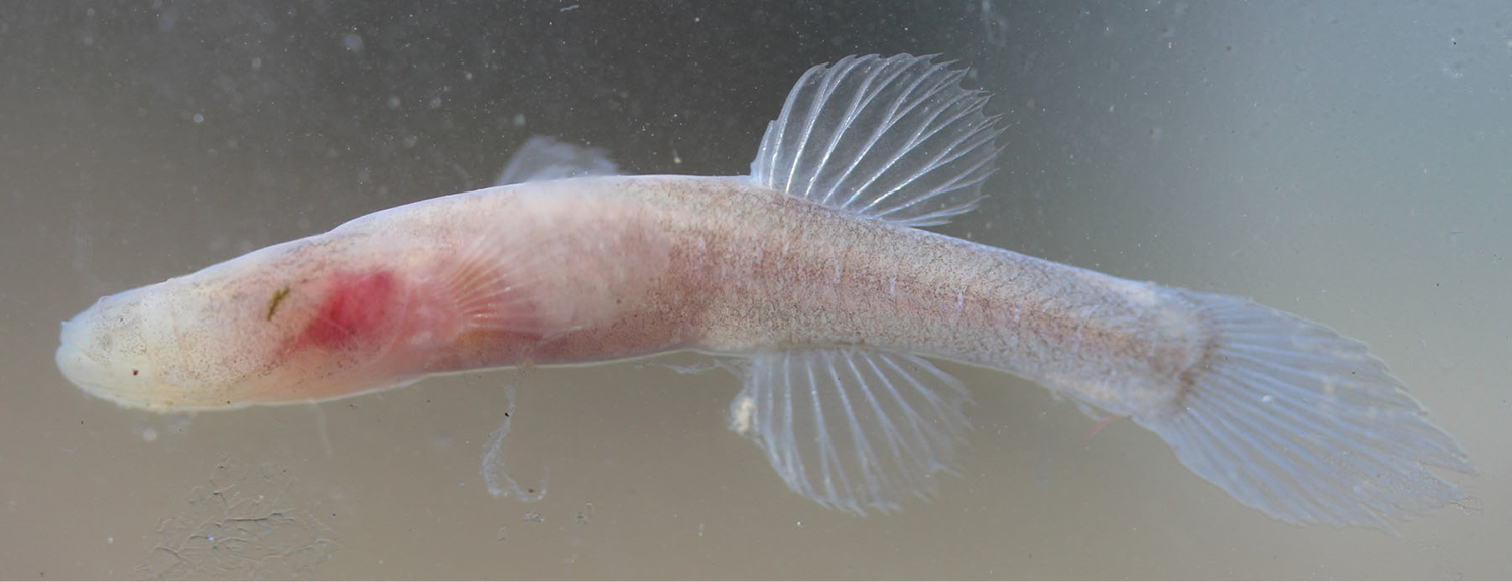

Conservation status
- Near Threatened (IUCN 3.1)

Scientific classification
- Kingdom: Animalia
- Phylum: Chordata
- Class: Actinopterygii
- Order: Percopsiformes
- Family: Amblyopsidae
- Genus: Typhlichthys; Girard, 1859
- Species: T. subterraneus

Binomial name
- Typhlichthys subterraneus Girard, 1859

= Typhlichthys subterraneus =

Species of fish

Typhlichthys subterraneus, the southern cavefish, is a species of cavefish in the family Amblyopsidae endemic to karst regions of the eastern United States.

== Taxonomy ==
T. subterraneus is a one of five obligate troglobitic species in Amblyopsidae. T. subterraneus is currently the only member of the genus Typhlichthys, but it may be a cryptic species complex.

The southern cavefish was described by Charles Frédéric Girard in 1859 from a well near Bowling Green, Warren County, Kentucky. Later, Eigenmann in 1905 described both T. osborni and T. wyandotte based on differences in head width and eye diameter. Typhlichthys osborni was described from Horse Cave, Kentucky, whereas T. wyandotte was described from a well near Corydon, Indiana, that was later destroyed. In 2002, a well-like entrance into a cave on the property of a car dealership in Corydon was discovered and is believed to represent the type locality. Regardless, this species is generally considered invalid and was not listed as a locality in a review of the genus in 1957. In this review, all Typhlichthys populations were included in T. subterraneus, as they were unable to find any clear geographic pattern in morphological variation. Recent surveys in the vicinity of Corydon have failed to document T. subterraneus, finding only Amblyopsis spelaea. The most likely contender for recognition as a separate species is Typhlichthys eigenmanni Charlton, 1933, described from Camden County, Missouri. This name has often been considered invalid as a nomen nudum, but in 2006 it was shown that the name is available and a subjective synonym of T. subterraneus. Although the various populations are very closely related, T. subterraneus was considered a cryptic species complex (rather than a single species) based on genetic evidence in 2011. Based on this study, the Ozark highland population should be recognized as the species T. eigenmanni.

A population from Sloans Valley Cave, Pulaski County, Kentucky, differs in several ways from populations to the southwest in Tennessee along the Cumberland Plateau and might represent an undescribed species.

== Distribution ==
This species is more commonly known as the Southern cavefish. This name is due to the southern states in which it is found, including Indiana, Alabama, Kentucky, Georgia, Missouri, Tennessee, Arkansas, and Oklahoma. The subterranean waters where the cavefish is found is divided by the Mississippi River. The regions that it occupies include the Ozark plateau of central and southeastern Missouri and northeastern Arkansas, the Cumberland and Interior low plateaus of northwest Alabama, northwest Georgia, central Tennessee and Kentucky, and southern Indiana. It has been observed that the species lives in solitary habitats and is mostly isolated.

== Ecology and conservation ==
Tyhplicthys subterraneus is mostly lentic, but can also be found in pools of streams near water tables. The cavefish feeds mostly on aquatic arthropods, such as amphipods and isopods. However, their metabolic rates are depressed in order to survive food shortages. The reproductive capabilities of this species is considerably low, with fewer than 50 eggs per female. This provides restrictions on its capabilities for recovering from an even minor population decline. When young are produced, they brood in the female's gill chamber. Sexual maturity requires approximately two years, and the life span is approximately four years.

Typhlichthys subterraneus is listed as near threatened on the IUCN Red List. Due to environmental threats, there has been a recent decline in geographical span and population density. This is perhaps due to pollution, lowering of the water table, flooding of reservoirs, or cave vandalism. Throughout the range of occupation, the cavefish has been placed under various conservation categories. To reduce these detrimental effects, there are several things that can improve the Southern cavefish's status.
