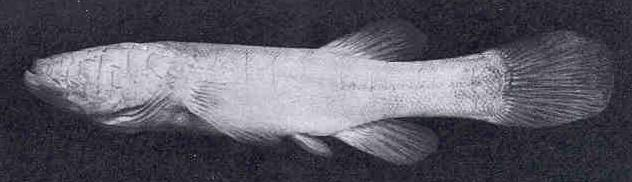

Conservation status
- Near Threatened (IUCN 3.1)

Scientific classification
- Kingdom: Animalia
- Phylum: Chordata
- Class: Actinopterygii
- Order: Percopsiformes
- Family: Amblyopsidae
- Genus: Amblyopsis
- Species: A. spelaea

Binomial name
- Amblyopsis spelaea DeKay, 1842

= Northern cavefish =

Species of fish

The northern cavefish or northern blindfish (Amblyopsis spelaea) is found in caves through Kentucky and southern Indiana. The International Union for Conservation of Nature lists the species as near threatened.

The life cycle of northern cavefish includes a protolarval stage. In this stage, eggs and those that have recently hatched into protolarvae are kept by the mother internally in a gill chamber. Juveniles become free swimming and can leave. The northern cavefish lives to a maximum age of at least ten years and reaches sexual maturity at approximately six years of age. Some estimates suggest that specimens may live up to 30-40 years in environments with stable food supplies.

During a 2013 study of Amblyopsis spelaea, scientists found that the species was divided into two distinct evolutionary lineages: one north of the Ohio River, in Indiana, and one south of the river, in Kentucky. The southern population retained the name A. spelaea and the northern was re-designated Amblyopsis hoosieri in a 2014 paper published in the journal ZooKeys. Neither species is found north of the White River, flowing east to west south of Bedford, Indiana.

The northern cavefish was under consideration for listing under the Endangered Species Act, however, the U.S. Fish and Wildlife Service found in 2023 that despite the loss of two metapopulations of A. spelaea, listing was not warranted, as the four metapopulations that still exist had sufficient redundancy of subpopulations to mitigate threats. The metapopulations are divided among two units that are separated by the Rough Creek Fault Zone. Threats to the species include habitat degradation, especially by groundwater contamination from encroaching agricultural operations, cities and industry, forest loss and surface water impoundment.
