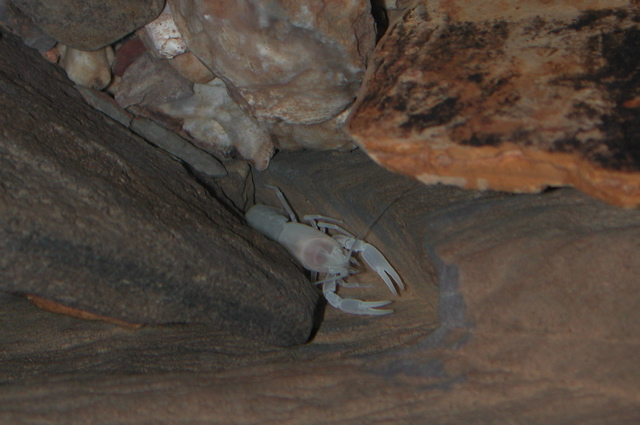

Conservation status
- Least Concern (IUCN 3.1)

- Secure (NatureServe)

Scientific classification
- Kingdom: Animalia
- Phylum: Arthropoda
- Class: Malacostraca
- Order: Decapoda
- Suborder: Pleocyemata
- Family: Cambaridae
- Genus: Orconectes
- Species: O. australis

Binomial name
- Orconectes australis (Rhoades, 1941)

= Orconectes australis =

Species of crayfish

Orconectes australis, the southern cave crayfish, is a species of crayfish in the Cambaridae family found in Alabama and Tennessee. Ages of 176 years have been claimed for O. australis, though this was reduced to ≤22 years in a 2012 study.

Media related to Orconectes australis at Wikimedia Commons
