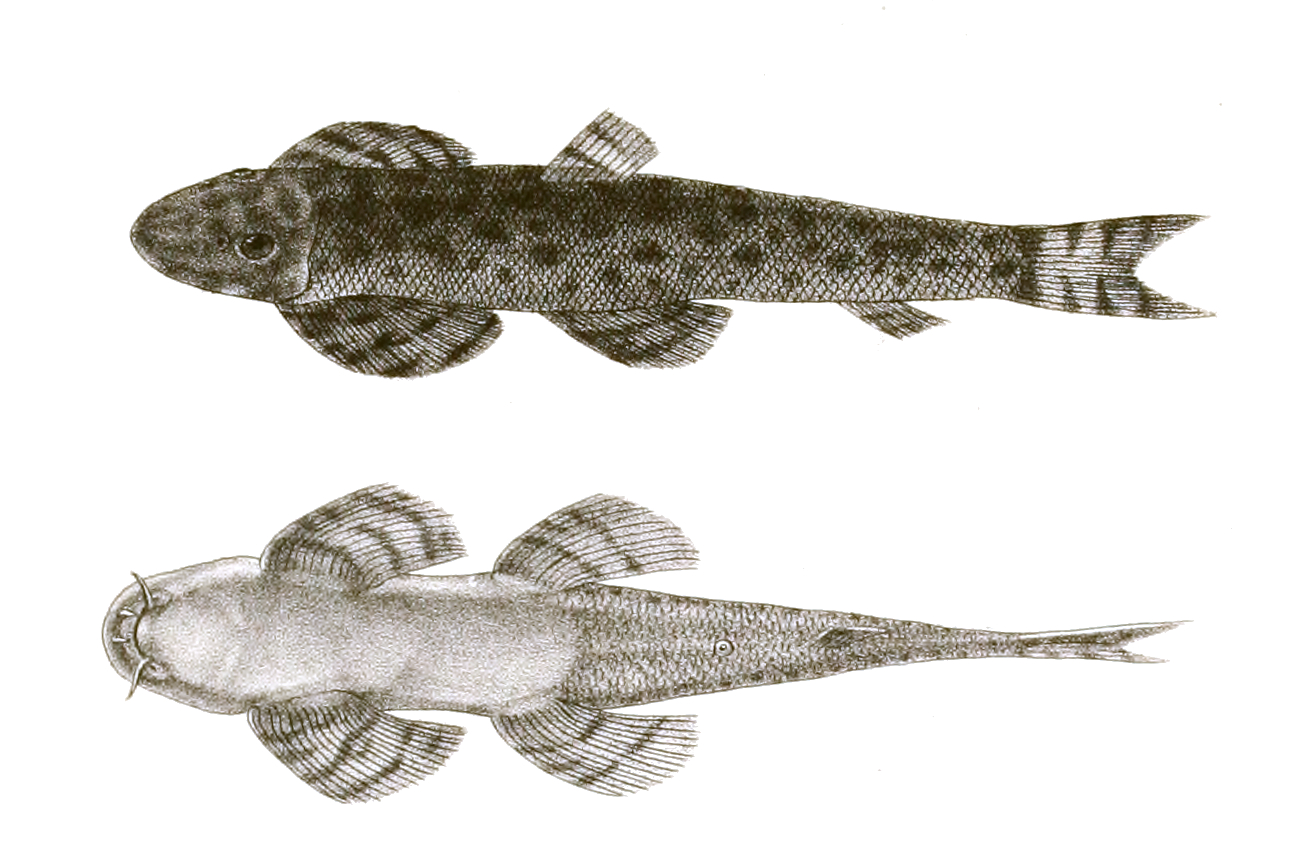
- Balitora brucei

Scientific classification
- Kingdom: Animalia
- Phylum: Chordata
- Class: Actinopterygii
- Order: Cypriniformes
- Family: Balitoridae
- Genus: Balitora; Gray, 1830

Type species
- Balitora brucei Gray, 1830

Synonyms
- Sinohomaloptera P.-W. Fang, 1930

= Balitora =

Genus of fishes

Balitora is a genus of ray-finned fishes in the family Balitoridae endemic to Asia.

== Species ==
There are currently 20 recognized species in this genus:

- Balitora anlongensis Luo, Chen, Zhao, Yu, Lan & Zhou, 2023
- Balitora annamitica Kottelat, 1988
- Balitora brucei Gray, 1830 (Gray's stone loach)
- Balitora burmanica Hora, 1932 (Burmese stone loach)
- Balitora chipkali Kumar, Katwate, Raghavan & Dahanukar, 2016
- Balitora chipkali Kumar, Katwate, Raghavan & Dahanukar, 2016
- Balitora eddsi Conway & Mayden, 2010
- Balitora elongata Chen & Li, 1985
- Balitora haithanhi V. H. Nguyễn, 2006
- Balitora jalpalli Raghavan, Tharian, Ali, Jadhav & Dahanukar, 2013
- Balitora kwangsiensis (P.-W. Fang, 1930)
- Balitora lancangjiangensis (Zheng, 1980)
- Balitora laticauda Bhoite, Jadhav & Dahanukar, 2012
- Balitora longibarbata (Y.-R. Chen, 1982)
- Balitora ludongensis Liu & Chen, 2012 (Ludong hillstream loach)
- Balitora meridionalis Kottelat, 1988
- Balitora mysorensis Hora, 1941 (Slender stone loach)
- Balitora nantingensis X.-Y. Chen, Cui & Yang, 2005
- Balitora tchangi Zheng, 1982
- Balitora vanlani V. H. Nguyen, 2006
- Balitora vanlongi V. H. Nguyen, 2006

A further species, Balitora arunachalensis is of uncertain validity.
