= Homaloptera manipurensis =

Scientific classification
- Domain: Eukaryota
- Kingdom: Animalia
- Phylum: Chordata
- Class: Actinopterygii
- Order: Cypriniformes
- Family: Balitoridae
- Genus: Homaloptera
- Species: H. manipurensis

Binomial name
- Homaloptera manipurensis Arunkumar, 1998

Species of fish

Homaloptera manipurensis is a species of ray-finned fish in the genus Homaloptera.

== Footnotes ==
- Froese, Rainer; Pauly, Daniel (eds.). "Homaloptera manipurensis". FishBase.
