= Hemimyzon yushanensis =

Scientific classification
- Kingdom: Animalia
- Phylum: Chordata
- Class: Actinopterygii
- Order: Cypriniformes
- Family: Balitoridae
- Genus: Hemimyzon
- Species: H. yushanensis

Binomial name
- Hemimyzon yushanensis (I. S. Chen, 2022)

Species of fish

Hemimyzon yushanensis is a species of ray-finned fish in the genus Hemimyzon.

H. yushanensis was identified in 2022, and can be differentiated from H. formosanus by the shape and number of its fins. Viewed laterally, H. yushanensis has an olive-brown body with whitish spots. The head and predorsal region can range from olive-brown to dark brown, and features creamy yellow spots. Ventrally, H. yushanensis is pale white. Its dorsal fin is pale white, with deep brown rays and rows of creamy white spots. The anal fin is similarly colored, but is not spotted. The caudal fin features a broad black outer margin and 3–4 oblique, zigzag creamy white streaks.

H. yushanensis specimens were collected from the hill streams of the Gaoping River basin, in both Kaohsiung City and Pingtung County, as well as the southern region of the Yushan National Park. The species was named for the Yushan Range, the main drainages of the Gaoping River.
