= Hemimyzon yaotanensis =

Scientific classification
- Kingdom: Animalia
- Phylum: Chordata
- Class: Actinopterygii
- Order: Cypriniformes
- Family: Balitoridae
- Genus: Hemimyzon
- Species: H. yaotanensis

Binomial name
- Hemimyzon yaotanensis (P. W. Fang, 1931)

Synonyms
- Sinohomaloptera yaotanensis Fang, 1931; Hemimyzon acuticauda (Fang, 1931)

Species of fish

Hemimyzon yaotanensis is a species of ray-finned fish in the genus Hemimyzon.

== Information ==
The Hemimyzon yaotanensis is known to be found in a freshwater environment within a demersal range. They are native to a temperate climate. The average length of a Hemimyzon yaotanensis as an unsexed male is about 8.4 centimeters or about 3.3 inches. This species can be found in the areas of Asia, Jinsha-jiang basin in Sichuan, and China.

== Footnotes ==
- Froese, Rainer; Pauly, Daniel (eds.). "Hemimyzon yaotanensis". FishBase.
