= Hemimyzon sheni =

Shen's river loach

Scientific classification
- Kingdom: Animalia
- Phylum: Chordata
- Class: Actinopterygii
- Order: Cypriniformes
- Family: Balitoridae
- Genus: Hemimyzon
- Species: H. sheni

Binomial name
- Hemimyzon sheni I. S. Chen & L. S. Fang, 2009

Species of fish

Hemimyzon sheni (Shen's river loach) is a species of ray-finned fish in the genus Hemimyzon. It is only known from Tar-Ju River basin, Taitung County, southeast Taiwan, where its type locality is. Only three specimens were collected and later attempts to find more specimens have failed. Among its relatives, H. sheni most closely resembles H. formosanus, but it seems to be more a head-water species than H. formosanus. It is a small species with standard length of 5 cm (2.0 in).
