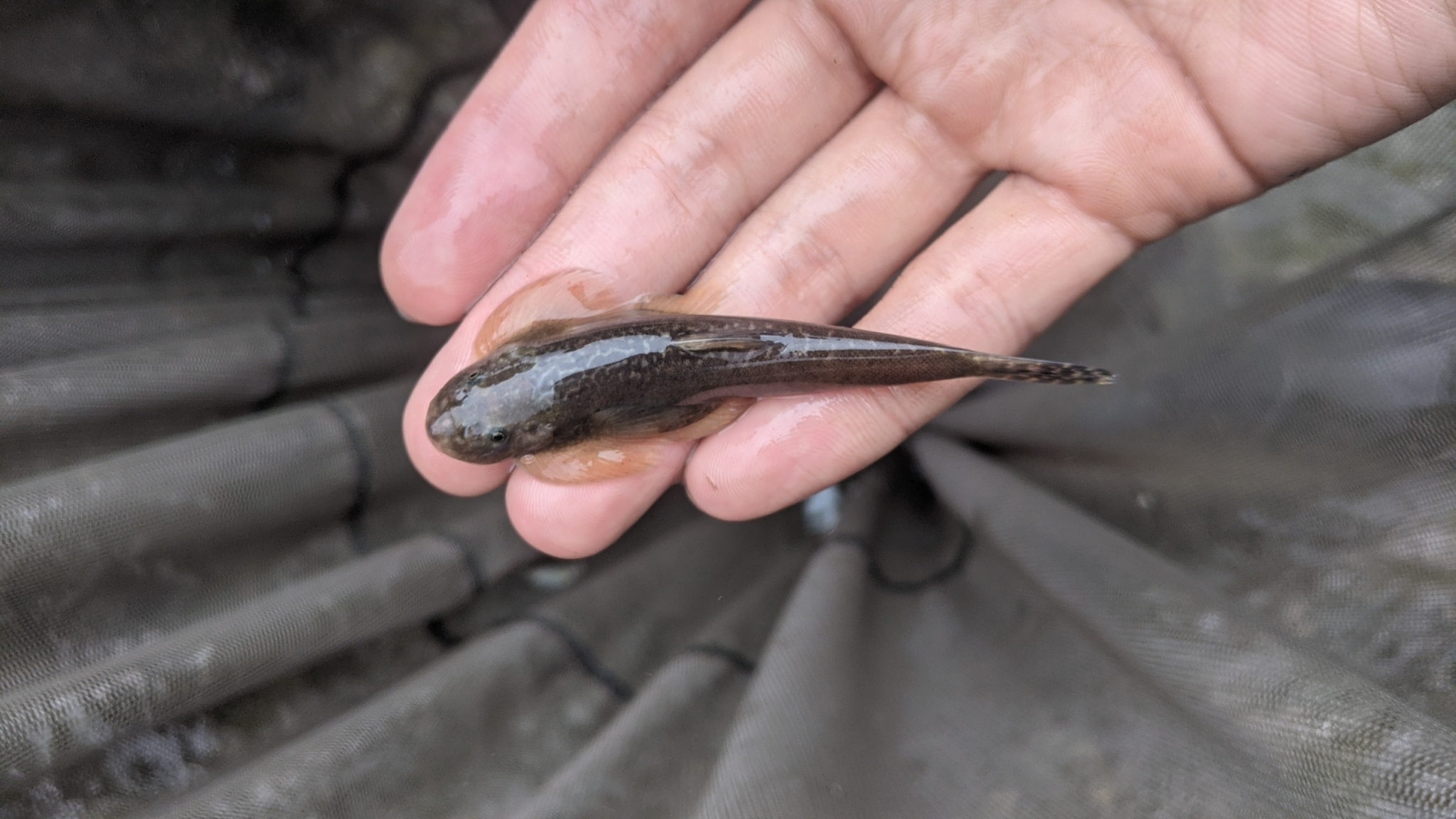

Conservation status
- Vulnerable (IUCN 2.3)

Scientific classification
- Kingdom: Animalia
- Phylum: Chordata
- Class: Actinopterygii
- Order: Cypriniformes
- Family: Balitoridae
- Genus: Hemimyzon
- Species: H. taitungensis

Binomial name
- Hemimyzon taitungensis C. S. Tzeng & S. C. Shen, 1982

= Hemimyzon taitungensis =

Taitung river loach

Species of fish

Hemimyzon taitungensis (common name: Taitung river loach, in Chinese 臺東間爬岩鰍, 台東間吸鰍, or 石貼仔) is a species of ray-finned fish in the family Balitoridae that is endemic to Taiwan. It is a small (length 12 cm (4.7 in)) freshwater fish currently known only from running waters of the Central Mountain Range of Taiwan at high and middle elevations. In contrast to H. formosanus, it appears to be a well-defined species with no signs of strong genetic structuring suggestive of cryptic species.

== See also ==
- List of protected species in Taiwan
- List of endemic species of Taiwan
