= Balitora kwangsiensis =

Conservation status
- Least Concern (IUCN 3.1)

Scientific classification
- Kingdom: Animalia
- Phylum: Chordata
- Class: Actinopterygii
- Order: Cypriniformes
- Family: Balitoridae
- Genus: Balitora
- Species: B. kwangsiensis

Binomial name
- Balitora kwangsiensis (P. W. Fang, 1930)

Synonyms
- Homaloptera hoffmanni (Herre, 1938); Homaloptera kwangsiensis P. W. Fang, 1930; Sinohomaloptera hoffmanni Herre, 1938; Sinohomaloptera kwangsiensis (P. W. Fang, 1930)

Species of fish

Balitora kwangsiensis is a species of hillstream loach found in Southeast Asia (southern China, Laos, and Vietnam). It inhabits rapid-flowing rivers and grows to a total length of 12 cm (4.7 in).
