= Hemimyzon macroptera =

Conservation status
- Least Concern (IUCN 3.1)

Scientific classification
- Kingdom: Animalia
- Phylum: Chordata
- Class: Actinopterygii
- Order: Cypriniformes
- Family: Balitoridae
- Genus: Hemimyzon
- Species: H. macroptera

Binomial name
- Hemimyzon macroptera C. Y. Zheng, 1982

Species of fish

Hemimyzon macroptera is a species of hillstream loach (a ray-finned fish) in the genus Hemimyzon. It is found in clear-water streams with rocky bottom in the Nanpan River basin, Yunnan, China. It is naturally scarce but widespread.
