= Sinogastromyzon rugocauda =

Conservation status
- Data Deficient (IUCN 3.1)

Scientific classification
- Kingdom: Animalia
- Phylum: Chordata
- Class: Actinopterygii
- Order: Cypriniformes
- Family: Balitoridae
- Genus: Sinogastromyzon
- Species: S. rugocauda

Binomial name
- Sinogastromyzon rugocauda Đ. Y. Mai, 1978

Species of fish

Sinogastromyzon rugocauda is a species of ray-finned fish in the genus Sinogastromyzon. It is found in the Ma River drainage in Laos and Vietnam. It lives in fast flowing rivers in rapids, clinging on rocks and large stones. It is used in local subsistence fisheries.
