= Hemimyzon tchangi =

Scientific classification
- Domain: Eukaryota
- Kingdom: Animalia
- Phylum: Chordata
- Class: Actinopterygii
- Order: Cypriniformes
- Family: Balitoridae
- Genus: Hemimyzon
- Species: H. tchangi

Binomial name
- Hemimyzon tchangi (C. Y. Zheng, 1982)

Synonyms
- Balitora tchangi Zheng, 1982

Species of fish

Hemimyzon tchangi is a species of ray-finned fish in the genus Hemimyzon.

== Footnotes ==
- Froese, Rainer; Pauly, Daniel (eds.). "Balitora tchangi". FishBase.
