= Balitora lancangjiangensis =

Conservation status
- Least Concern (IUCN 3.1)

Scientific classification
- Kingdom: Animalia
- Phylum: Chordata
- Class: Actinopterygii
- Order: Cypriniformes
- Family: Balitoridae
- Genus: Balitora
- Species: B. lancangjiangensis

Binomial name
- Balitora lancangjiangensis (C. Y. Zheng, 1980)

Synonyms
- Sinohomaloptera lancangjiangensis Zheng, 1980

Species of fish

Balitora lancangjiangensis is a species of hill-stream loach from the Mekong and Red River basins. Sources differ in distribution, but all list Yunnan (China) and Laos, and at least the International Union for Conservation of Nature also lists Vietnam, Burma, and Thailand.

Balitora vanlongi might be junior synonym of Balitora lancangjiangensis.

Balitora lancangjiangensis grow to 7.1 cm (2.8 in) SL. It occurs in fast flowing stretches of waters in rivers and large streams.
