= Pseudohomaloptera vulgaris =

Conservation status
- Data Deficient (IUCN 3.1)

Scientific classification
- Kingdom: Animalia
- Phylum: Chordata
- Class: Actinopterygii
- Order: Cypriniformes
- Family: Balitoridae
- Genus: Pseudohomaloptera
- Species: P. vulgaris

Binomial name
- Pseudohomaloptera vulgaris Kottelat & X. L. Chu, 1988

Synonyms
- Homaloptera vulgaris Kottelat & Chu, 1988; Balitoropsis vulgaris (Kottelat & Chu, 1988)

Species of fish

Pseudohomaloptera vulgaris is a fish species of the genus Pseudohomaloptera in the family Balitoridae.
