= Dienbienia =

Scientific classification
- Kingdom: Animalia
- Phylum: Chordata
- Class: Actinopterygii
- Division: Teleostei
- Order: Cypriniformes
- Family: Balitoridae
- Genus: Dienbienia; V. H. Nguyễn & H. D. Nguyễn, 2002
- Species: D. namnuaensis

Binomial name
- Dienbienia namnuaensis V. H. Nguyễn & H. D. Nguyễn, 2002

Species of fish

Dienbienia namnuaensis is a species of loach endemic to Vietnam. It is the only member of the genus Dienbienia.
