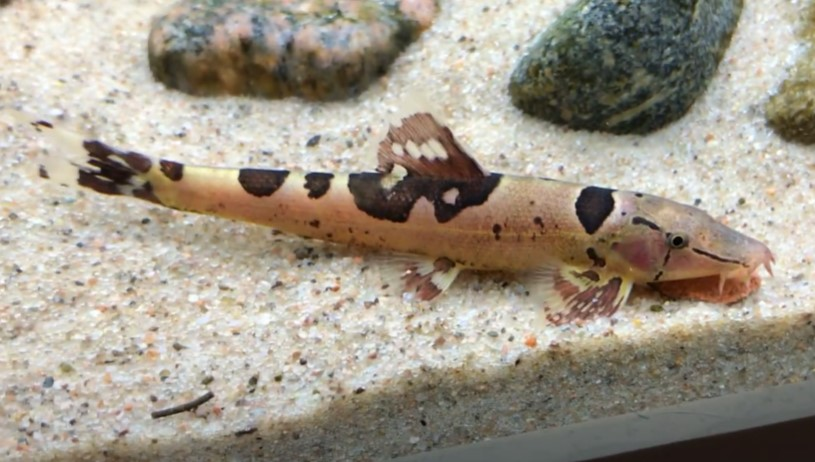

Conservation status
- Least Concern (IUCN 3.1)

Scientific classification
- Kingdom: Animalia
- Phylum: Chordata
- Class: Actinopterygii
- Order: Cypriniformes
- Family: Balitoridae
- Genus: Homaloptera
- Species: H. orthogoniata

Binomial name
- Homaloptera orthogoniata Vaillant, 1902

= Homaloptera orthogoniata =

Species of fish

Homaloptera orthogoniata is a species of ray-finned fish in the genus Homaloptera found in Thailand, Laos and Indonesia.
