= Homalopterula heterolepis =

Conservation status
- Near Threatened (IUCN 3.1)

Scientific classification
- Domain: Eukaryota
- Kingdom: Animalia
- Phylum: Chordata
- Class: Actinopterygii
- Order: Cypriniformes
- Family: Balitoridae
- Genus: Homalopterula
- Species: H. heterolepis

Binomial name
- Homalopterula heterolepis (M. C. W. Weber & de Beaufort, 1916)

Synonyms
- Homaloptera heterolepis Weber & de Beaufort, 1916

Species of fish

Homalopterula heterolepis is a species of ray-finned fish in the genus Homalopterula. It can be found in northern Sumatra.
