= Slender stone loach =

Conservation status
- Vulnerable (IUCN 3.1)

Scientific classification
- Kingdom: Animalia
- Phylum: Chordata
- Class: Actinopterygii
- Order: Cypriniformes
- Family: Balitoridae
- Genus: Balitora
- Species: B. mysorensis

Binomial name
- Balitora mysorensis Hora, 1941

Species of fish

Slender stone loach (Balitora mysorensis) is a species of hill-stream loach. It is endemic to the Western Ghats, India, and known from Kerala and Karnataka, and possibly from Maharashtra. It inhabits torrential streams and can be found attached to bedrock, cobbles, and boulders.

Slender stone loach grow to 5.0 cm (2.0 in) SL.

Slender stone loach are occasionally collected for international aquarium trade. In some rivers the species is threatened by pollution from plantations as well as destructive fishing practices.
