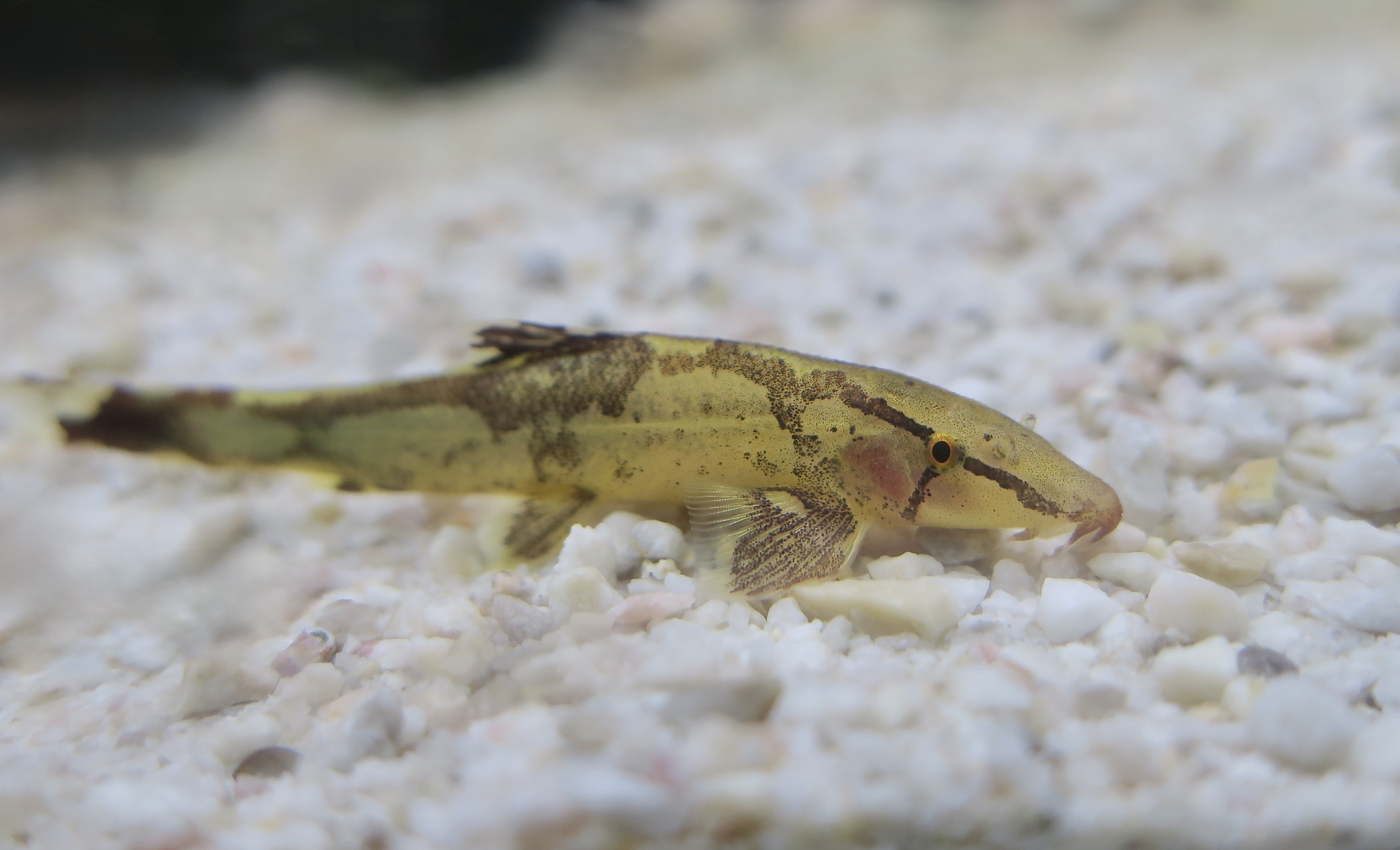

Conservation status
- Data Deficient (IUCN 3.1)

Scientific classification
- Kingdom: Animalia
- Phylum: Chordata
- Class: Actinopterygii
- Order: Cypriniformes
- Family: Balitoridae
- Genus: Homaloptera
- Species: H. confuzona

Binomial name
- Homaloptera confuzona Kottelat, 2000

= Homaloptera confuzona =

Species of fish

Homaloptera confuzona is a species of hillstream loach in the genus Homaloptera found in Laos, Cambodia, Thailand and Vietnam. It lives in the lower Mekong drainage and coastal streams of Cambodia and eastern Thailand. Its maximum size is about 40 cm (16 in) SL.

Homaloptera confuzona is eaten locally and it is occasionally bred in the aquarium fish trade.
