= Homalopteroides smithi =

Conservation status
- Least Concern (IUCN 3.1)

Scientific classification
- Kingdom: Animalia
- Phylum: Chordata
- Class: Actinopterygii
- Division: Teleostei
- Order: Cypriniformes
- Family: Balitoridae
- Genus: Homalopteroides
- Species: H. smithi

Binomial name
- Homalopteroides smithi (Hora, 1932)

Synonyms
- Homaloptera smithi Hora, 1932; Homaloptera lineata Smith, 1945

Species of fish

Homalopteroides smithi is a species of ray-finned fish in the genus Homalopteroides. It can be found in the Mekong and Chao Phraya basins and Malay Peninsula.

The fish is named in honor of ichthyologist Hugh McCormick Smith (1865–1941), then at the Siam Department of Fisheries, in what is now Thailand.

Other common names include the Green Gecko Loach or Shi's Flatfin Loach (a direct translation of the fish's chinese name '史氏平鰭鰍').
