= Homalopteroides yuwonoi =

Conservation status
- Data Deficient (IUCN 3.1)

Scientific classification
- Domain: Eukaryota
- Kingdom: Animalia
- Phylum: Chordata
- Class: Actinopterygii
- Order: Cypriniformes
- Family: Balitoridae
- Genus: Homalopteroides
- Species: H. yuwonoi

Binomial name
- Homalopteroides yuwonoi (Kottelat, 1998)

Synonyms
- Homaloptera yuwonoi Kottelat, 1998; Balitoropsis yuwonoi (Kottelat, 1998)

Species of fish

Homalopteroides yuwonoi is a species of ray-finned fish in the genus Homalopteroides.
