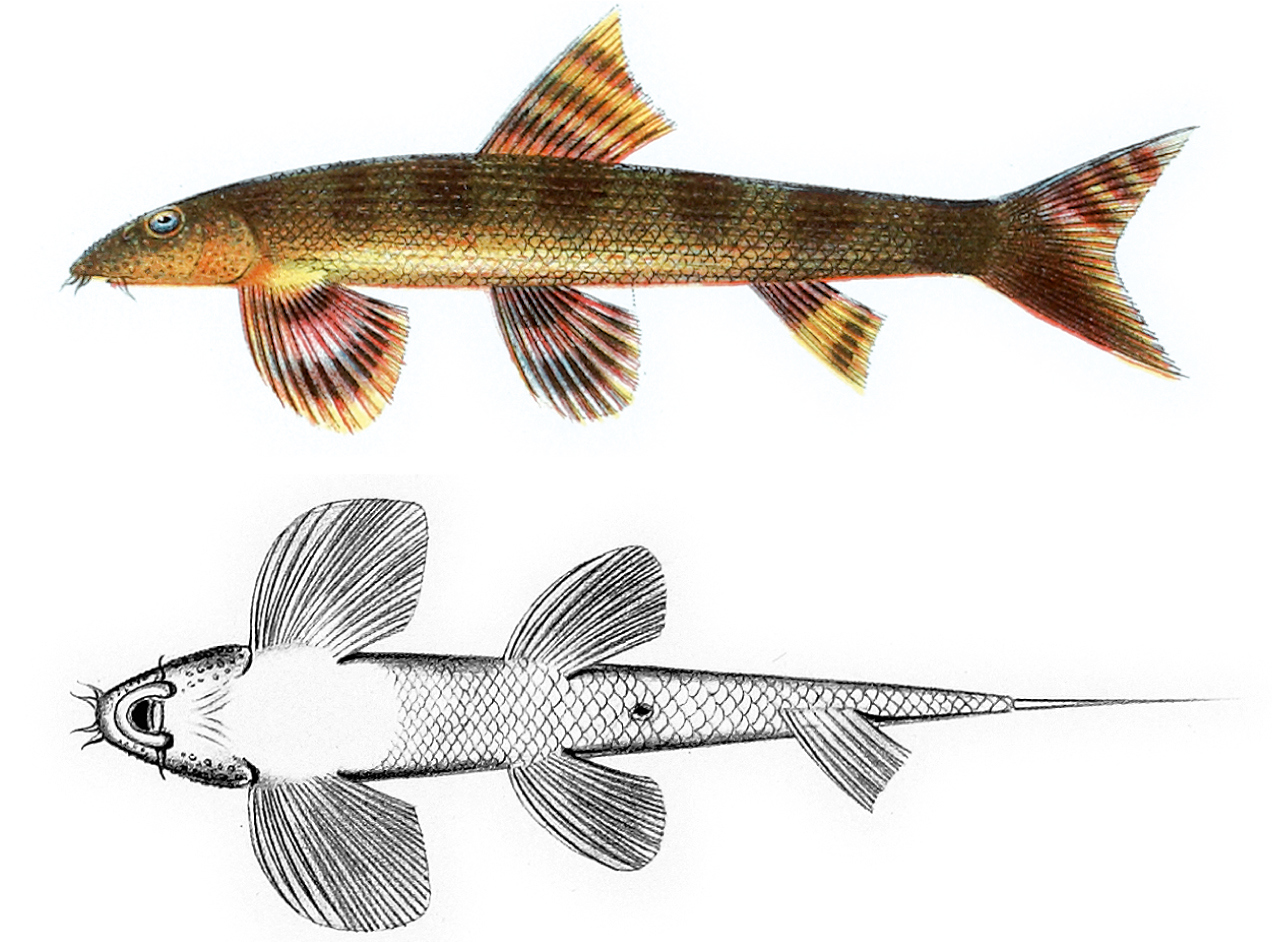

Conservation status
- Least Concern (IUCN 3.1)

Scientific classification
- Kingdom: Animalia
- Phylum: Chordata
- Class: Actinopterygii
- Order: Cypriniformes
- Family: Balitoridae
- Genus: Balitoropsis
- Species: B. zollingeri

Binomial name
- Balitoropsis zollingeri (Bleeker, 1853)

Synonyms
- Homaloptera zollingeri Bleeker, 1853; Homaloptera javanica van Hasselt, 1823; Homaloptera maxinae Fowler, 1937; Balitoropsis bartschi Smith, 1945; Homaloptera nigra Alfred, 1969

= Balitoropsis zollingeri =

Species of fish

Balitoropsis zollingeri the black lizard loach, is a species of freshwater ray-finned fish belonging to the family Balitoridae, species in this family are commonly called the hillstream loaches, although this common name also refers to the loaches in the family Gastromyzontidae. The black lizard loach is found in unpolluted streams with a fast current, high levels of dissolved oxygen and rocky beds. It shows a preference for areas where there are pebbles, rocks, boulders or bedrock completely covered in algae.
