= Travancoria elongata =

Conservation status
- Endangered (IUCN 3.1)

Scientific classification
- Kingdom: Animalia
- Phylum: Chordata
- Class: Actinopterygii
- Order: Cypriniformes
- Family: Balitoridae
- Genus: Travancoria
- Species: T. elongata

Binomial name
- Travancoria elongata Pethiyagoda & Kottelat, 1994

Species of fish

Travancoria elongata, which is also known as Periyar loach, (മലയാളം: നെടും കൽനക്കി) is an endangered species of freshwater fish only found in Chalakudy River and Periyar River, from the family of Balitoridae (River loaches). These fishes grows up to 11 centimetres (4.3 in) long. Large-scale capture of these species from rivers in order to export them to the international market as ornamental fish has become a threat to this species. Included in the Red Data Book, they are on the verge of extinction.
