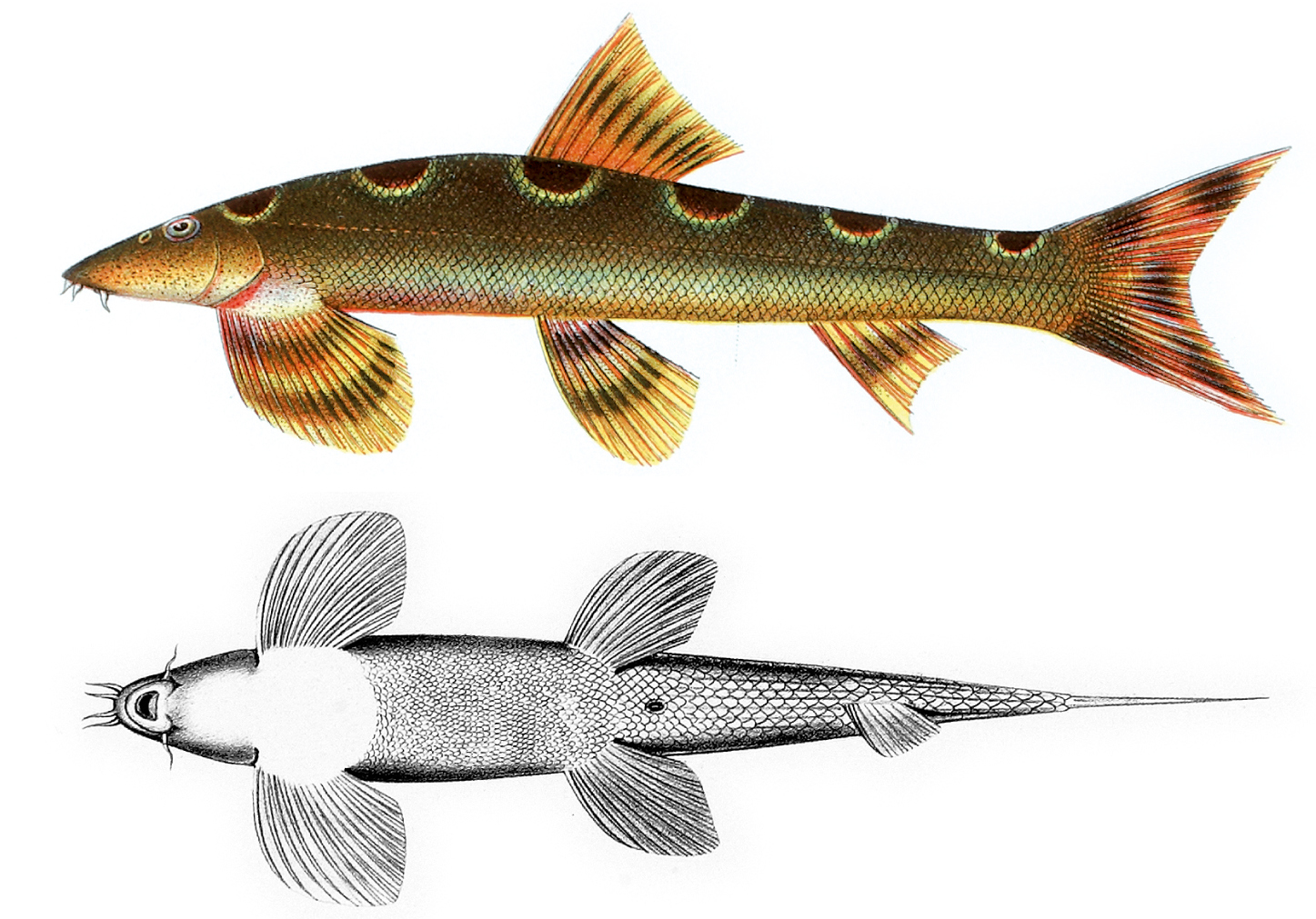

Conservation status
- Vulnerable (IUCN 3.1)

Scientific classification
- Kingdom: Animalia
- Phylum: Chordata
- Class: Actinopterygii
- Order: Cypriniformes
- Family: Balitoridae
- Genus: Balitoropsis
- Species: B. ophiolepis

Binomial name
- Balitoropsis ophiolepis (Bleeker, 1853)

Synonyms
- Homaloptera ophiolepis Bleeker, 1853

= Balitoropsis ophiolepis =

Species of fish

Balitoropsis ophiolepis, the slender lizard loach, is a species of freshwater ray-finned fish belonging to the family Balitoridae, species in this family are commonly called the hillstream loaches, although this common name also refers to the loaches in the family Gastromyzontidae. The slender lizard loch lives in rocky riffles in fast flowing hill streams in the basins of the Musi and Tulang Bawang Rivers in southern Sumatra and the Kapuas River in West Kalimantan on Borneo in Indonesia.
