= Pseudohomaloptera batek =

Scientific classification
- Kingdom: Animalia
- Phylum: Chordata
- Class: Actinopterygii
- Order: Cypriniformes
- Family: Balitoridae
- Genus: Pseudohomaloptera
- Species: P. batek

Binomial name
- Pseudohomaloptera batek (H. H. Tan, 2009)

Synonyms
- Homaloptera batek Tan, 2009; Balitoropsis batek Tan, 2009

Species of fish

Pseudohomaloptera batek is a fish species of the genus Pseudohomaloptera in the family Balitoridae.
