= Homaloptera ogilviei =

Conservation status
- Least Concern (IUCN 3.1)

Scientific classification
- Kingdom: Animalia
- Phylum: Chordata
- Class: Actinopterygii
- Order: Cypriniformes
- Family: Balitoridae
- Genus: Homaloptera
- Species: H. ogilviei

Binomial name
- Homaloptera ogilviei Alfred, 1967

Species of fish

Homaloptera ogilviei is a species of ray-finned fish in the genus Homaloptera found in Malaysia and western Borneo.
