= Hemimyzon elongata =

Scientific classification
- Kingdom: Animalia
- Phylum: Chordata
- Class: Actinopterygii
- Order: Cypriniformes
- Family: Balitoridae
- Genus: Hemimyzon
- Species: H. elongata

Binomial name
- Hemimyzon elongata (Y. R. Chen & Z. Y. Li, 1985)

Synonyms
- Balitora elongata Y. R. Chen & Z. Y. Li, 1985

Species of fish

Hemimyzon elongata is a species of ray-finned fish in the genus Hemimyzon. It has been found in the Mekong basin in Yunnan, China. It is a benthopelagic, freshwater fish.
