= Sinogastromyzon minutus =

Conservation status
- Data Deficient (IUCN 3.1)

Scientific classification
- Kingdom: Animalia
- Phylum: Chordata
- Class: Actinopterygii
- Order: Cypriniformes
- Family: Balitoridae
- Genus: Sinogastromyzon
- Species: S. minutus

Binomial name
- Sinogastromyzon minutus Đ. Y. Mai, 1978

Species of fish

Sinogastromyzon minutus is a species of ray-finned fish in the genus Sinogastromyzon. It is endemic to the Red River drainage in northwestern Vietnam. It lives in creeks and small rivers.
