= Sinogastromyzon szechuanensis =

Conservation status
- Least Concern (IUCN 3.1)

Scientific classification
- Kingdom: Animalia
- Phylum: Chordata
- Class: Actinopterygii
- Order: Cypriniformes
- Family: Balitoridae
- Genus: Sinogastromyzon
- Species: S. szechuanensis

Binomial name
- Sinogastromyzon szechuanensis P. W. Fang, 1930

Species of fish

Sinogastromyzon szechuanensis is a species of ray-finned fish in the genus Sinogastromyzon. It is endemic to the upper Yangtze River system in Gansu, Hubei, Guizhou, and Sichuan provinces, China. It lives in rapid flowing streams in hilly areas and is caught in local fisheries. It grows to 7.7 cm (3.0 in) SL.
