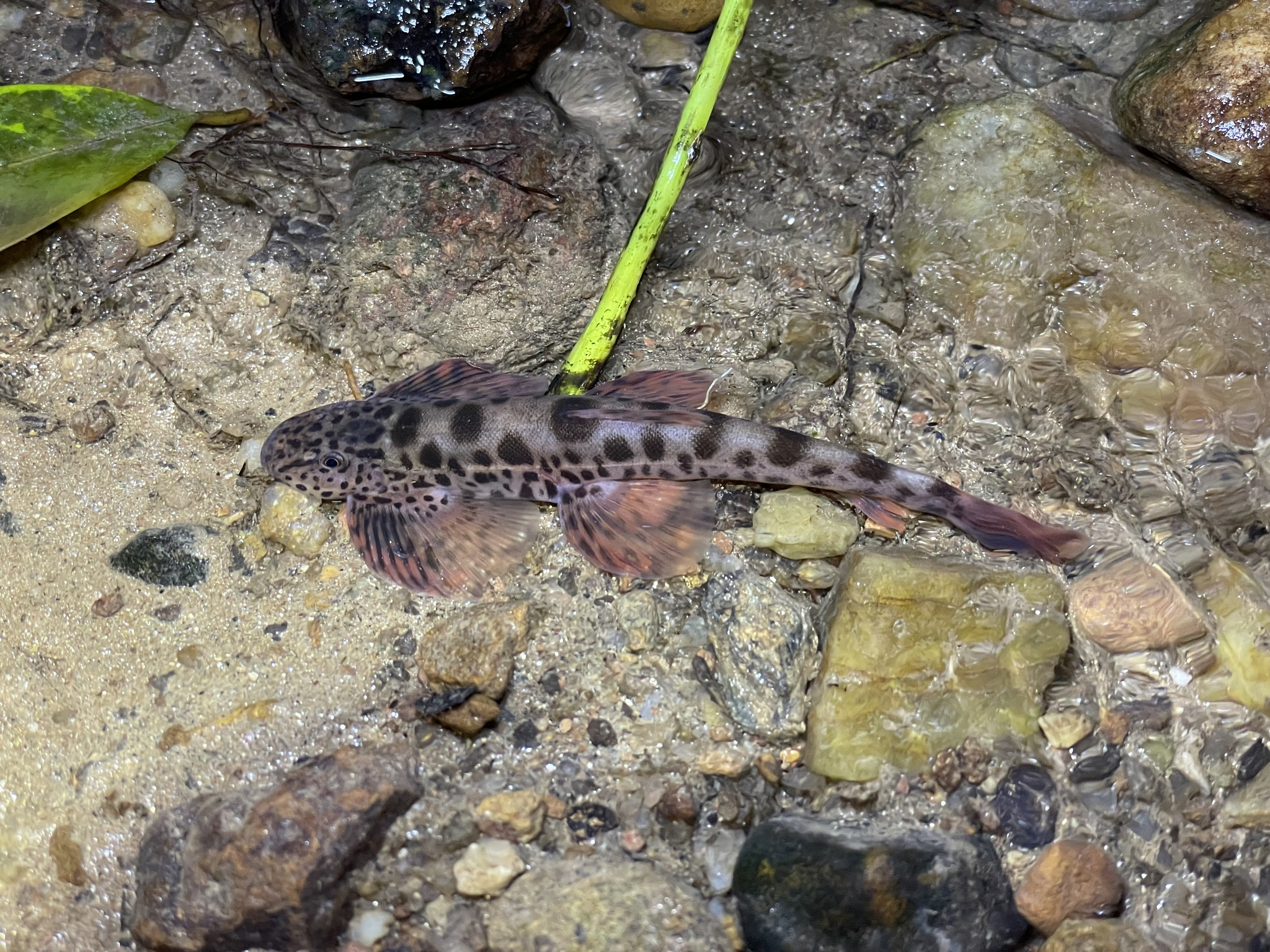
- From Sakleshpur, Hassan District, Karnataka, India.

Conservation status
- Least Concern (IUCN 3.1)

Scientific classification
- Kingdom: Animalia
- Phylum: Chordata
- Class: Actinopterygii
- Order: Cypriniformes
- Family: Balitoridae
- Genus: Bhavania
- Species: B. australis

Binomial name
- Bhavania australis Jerdon, 1849

Synonyms
- Platycara australis Jerdon, 1849; Homaloptera maculata Day, 1877; Homaloptera brucei Day, 1877

= Bhavania australis =

Species of fish

Bhavania australis, also known as the Western Ghats loach, is a species of hillstream loach endemic to the Western Ghats in southern Karnataka, Kerala, and Tamil Nadu, India. While it is considered least concern by the IUCN Red List, research shows it to be endangered due to habitat destruction, pollution and dynamite fishing.

It is usually dark on the dorsal surface, with black spots irregularly distributed on the body. It grows to a maximum size of 9 cm (3.5 in).

== In captivity ==
Bhavania australis is difficult to maintain in aquarium conditions. It has been observed that it cannot thrive well in aquariums for more than a month. It is generally peaceful, and tends to stick to the glass surface of tanks.
