= Hemimyzon confluens =

Conservation status
- Vulnerable (IUCN 3.1)

Scientific classification
- Kingdom: Animalia
- Phylum: Chordata
- Class: Actinopterygii
- Order: Cypriniformes
- Family: Balitoridae
- Genus: Hemimyzon
- Species: H. confluens

Binomial name
- Hemimyzon confluens Kottelat, 2000

Species of fish

Hemimyzon confluens is a species of ray-finned fish in the genus Hemimyzon. It is known from a single location in the Nam Ngum drainage in Laos, a tributary of the Mekong. The known material suggests a maximum standard length of about 47 mm (1.9 in). H. confluens is threatened by pollution from mining activities and hydro-power development.
