= Sinogastromyzon hsiashiensis =

Scientific classification
- Kingdom: Animalia
- Phylum: Chordata
- Class: Actinopterygii
- Order: Cypriniformes
- Family: Balitoridae
- Genus: Sinogastromyzon
- Species: S. hsiashiensis

Binomial name
- Sinogastromyzon hsiashiensis P. W. Fang, 1931

Species of fish

Sinogastromyzon hsiashiensis is a species of ray-finned fish in the genus Sinogastromyzon. It is endemic to China, and its type locality is in Guizhou. It grows to 6.3 cm (2.5 in) SL.
