= Hemimyzon papilio =

Conservation status
- Least Concern (IUCN 3.1)

Scientific classification
- Kingdom: Animalia
- Phylum: Chordata
- Class: Actinopterygii
- Order: Cypriniformes
- Family: Balitoridae
- Genus: Hemimyzon
- Species: H. papilio

Binomial name
- Hemimyzon papilio Kottelat, 1998

Species of fish

Hemimyzon papilio is a species of ray-finned fish in the genus Hemimyzon.
