= Homalopteroides stephensoni =

Scientific classification
- Kingdom: Animalia
- Phylum: Chordata
- Class: Actinopterygii
- Order: Cypriniformes
- Family: Balitoridae
- Genus: Homalopteroides
- Species: H. stephensoni

Binomial name
- Homalopteroides stephensoni (Hora, 1932)

Synonyms
- Balitoropsis stephensoni (Hora, 1932); Homaloptera stephensoni Hora, 1932

Species of fish

Homalopteroides stephensoni is a species of the genus Homalopteroides in the family Balitoridae. It can be found in the Kapuas and Mahakam rivers in Borneo.
