= Sinogastromyzon nantaiensis =

Scientific classification
- Kingdom: Animalia
- Phylum: Chordata
- Class: Actinopterygii
- Order: Cypriniformes
- Family: Balitoridae
- Genus: Sinogastromyzon
- Species: S. nantaiensis

Binomial name
- Sinogastromyzon nantaiensis I. S. Chen, C. C. Han & L. S. Fang, 2002

Species of fish

Sinogastromyzon nantaiensis is a species of hillstream loach (a ray-finned fish) in the genus Sinogastromyzon. It is endemic to Taiwan. It is found in the Kaoping and Tsengwen River basins in the southern Taiwan. Its maximum length is 8 cm (3.1 in).
