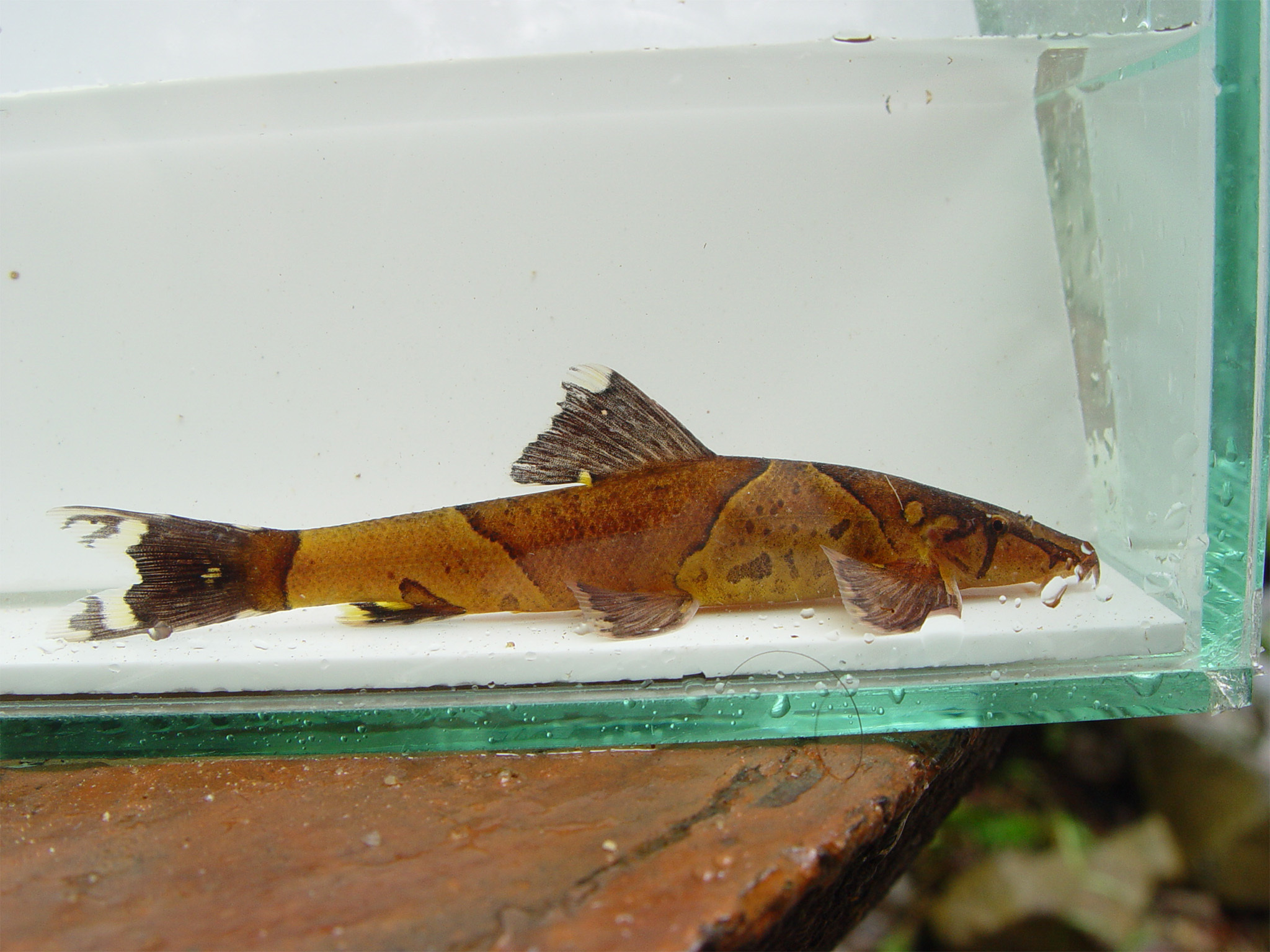

Conservation status
- Least Concern (IUCN 3.1)

Scientific classification
- Kingdom: Animalia
- Phylum: Chordata
- Class: Actinopterygii
- Order: Cypriniformes
- Family: Balitoridae
- Genus: Homaloptera
- Species: H. parclitella

Binomial name
- Homaloptera parclitella H. H. Tan & P. K. L. Ng, 2005

= Homaloptera parclitella =

Species of fish

Homaloptera parclitella is a species of ray-finned fish in the genus Homaloptera found in Malay Peninsula.
