= Hemimyzon megalopseos =

Scientific classification
- Kingdom: Animalia
- Phylum: Chordata
- Class: Actinopterygii
- Order: Cypriniformes
- Family: Balitoridae
- Genus: Hemimyzon
- Species: H. megalopseos

Binomial name
- Hemimyzon megalopseos Z. Y. Li & Y. R. Chen, 1985

Species of fish

Hemimyzon megalopseos is a species of ray-finned fish in the genus Hemimyzon.

== Footnotes ==
- Froese, Rainer; Pauly, Daniel (eds.). "Hemimyzon megalopseos". FishBase.
