= Homalopteroides modestus =

Conservation status
- Data Deficient (IUCN 3.1)

Scientific classification
- Domain: Eukaryota
- Kingdom: Animalia
- Phylum: Chordata
- Class: Actinopterygii
- Order: Cypriniformes
- Family: Balitoridae
- Genus: Homalopteroides
- Species: H. modestus

Binomial name
- Homalopteroides modestus (Vinciguerra, 1890)

Synonyms
- Helgia modesta Vinciguerra, 1890; Homaloptera modesta (Vinciguerra, 1890)

Species of fish

Homalopteroides modestus is a species of ray-finned fish in the genus Homalopteroides. It can be found in lower Myanmar and Thailand.
