= Vanderbilti =

Vanderbilti may refer to:

- Pycnochromis vanderbilti
- Malacocincla vanderbilti
- Homalopterula vanderbilti
- Cirripectes vanderbilti
- Machaerenchelys vanderbilti
