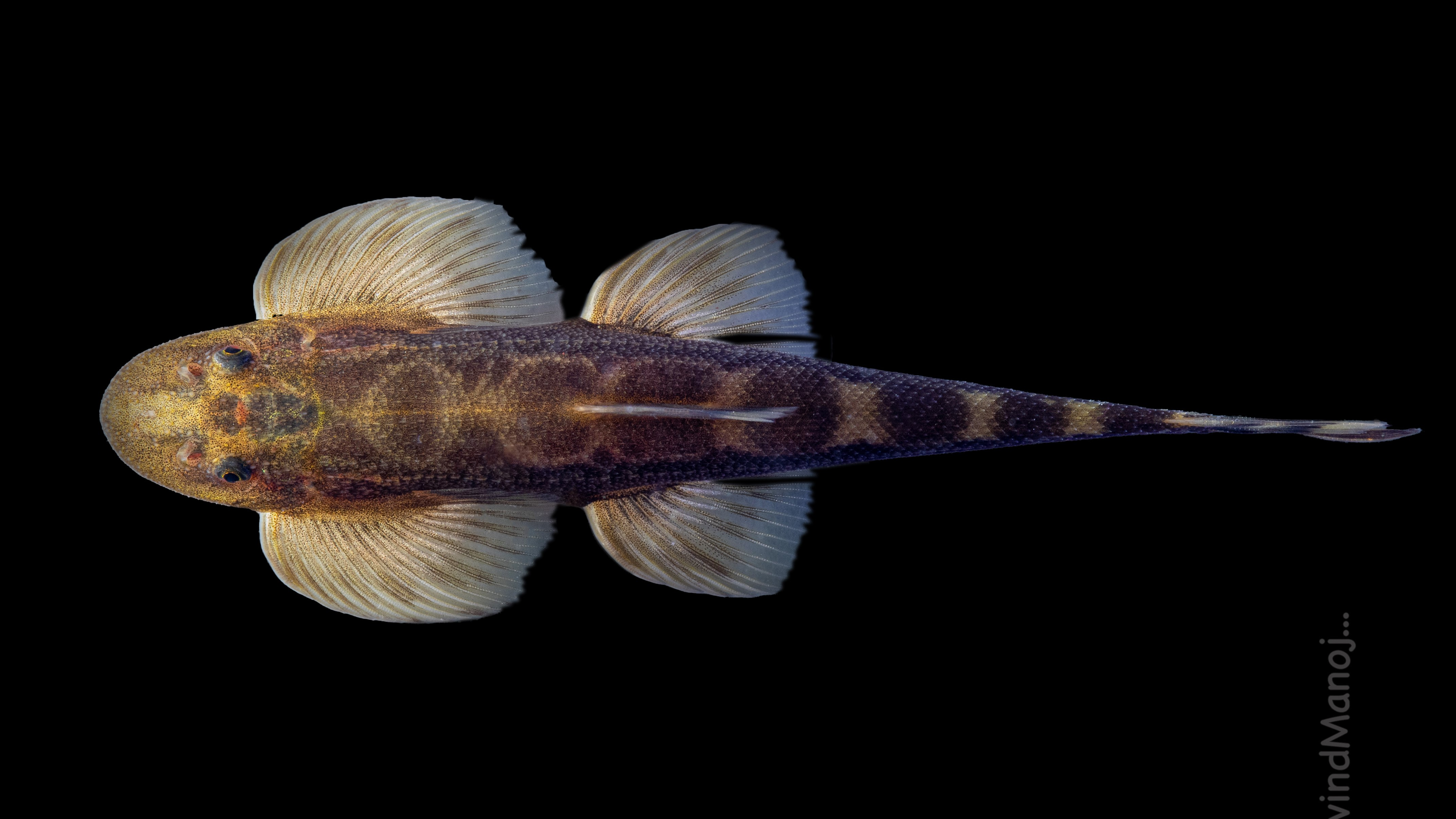

Conservation status
- Near Threatened (IUCN 3.1)

Scientific classification
- Kingdom: Animalia
- Phylum: Chordata
- Class: Actinopterygii
- Division: Teleostei
- Order: Cypriniformes
- Family: Balitoridae
- Genus: Balitora
- Species: B. brucei

Binomial name
- Balitora brucei J. E. Gray, 1830

Synonyms
- Balitora maculata Gray, 1830; Homaloptera brucei (Gray, 1830); Homaloptera maculata (Gray, 1830); Platycara maculata (Gray, 1830); Platycara anisura McClelland & Griffith, 1842

= Gray's stone loach =

Species of fish

Gray's stone loach (Balitora brucei) is a species of ray-finned fish in the family Balitoridae. It is endemic to India, Bhutan, Bangladesh, Nepal and Myanmar. It grows to a maximum length of 10.5 cm (4.1 in).

They are found in rapid streams in ditches. Females are more often plumper than males.
