= Hemimyzon nujiangensis =

Conservation status
- Data Deficient (IUCN 3.1)

Scientific classification
- Domain: Eukaryota
- Kingdom: Animalia
- Phylum: Chordata
- Class: Actinopterygii
- Order: Cypriniformes
- Family: Balitoridae
- Genus: Hemimyzon
- Species: H. nujiangensis

Binomial name
- Hemimyzon nujiangensis (W. Zhang & C. Y. Zheng, 1983)

Synonyms
- Balitoria nujiangensis W. Zhang & C. Y. Zheng, 1983

Species of fish

Hemimyzon nujiangensis is a species of hillstream loach endemic to Yunnan, China.
