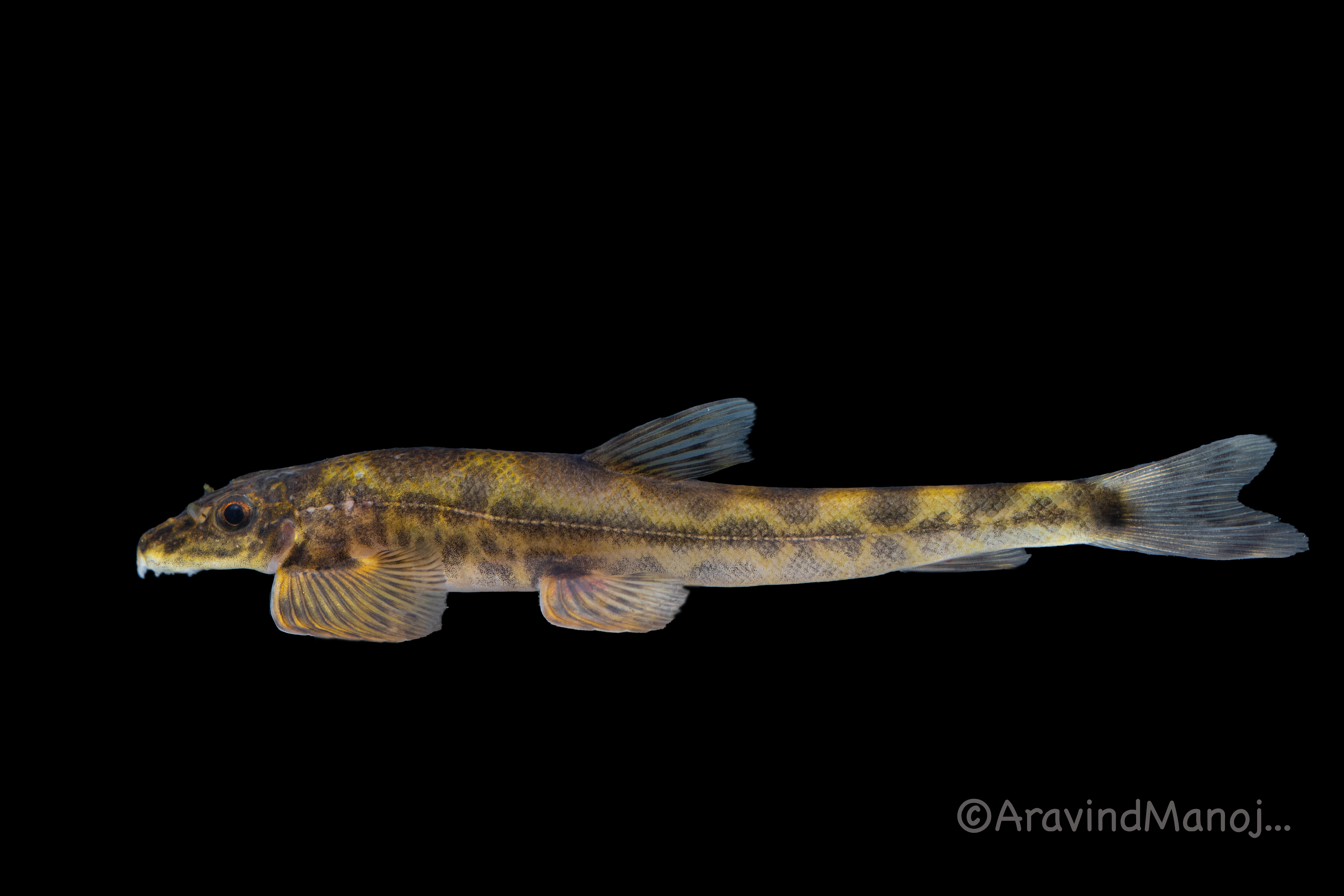
- Travancoria jonesi

Conservation status
- Endangered (IUCN 3.1)

Scientific classification
- Kingdom: Animalia
- Phylum: Chordata
- Class: Actinopterygii
- Order: Cypriniformes
- Family: Balitoridae
- Genus: Travancoria
- Species: T. jonesi

Binomial name
- Travancoria jonesi Hora, 1941

= Travancoria jonesi =

Species of fish

Travancoria jonesi, the Travancore loach, is a species of freshwater ray-finned fish belonging to the family Balitoridae, the river or hillstream loaches. This loach is endemic to the Western Ghats in Kerala.
