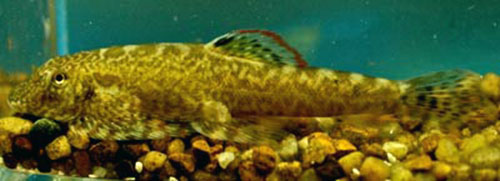

Scientific classification
- Kingdom: Animalia
- Phylum: Chordata
- Class: Actinopterygii
- Order: Cypriniformes
- Family: Balitoridae
- Genus: Jinshaia
- Species: J. sinensis

Binomial name
- Jinshaia sinensis (Sauvage & Dabry de Thiersant, 1874)

Synonyms
- Psilorhynchus sinensis Sauvage & Dabry de Thiersant, 1874; Hemimyzon sinensis (Sauvage & Dabry de Thiersant, 1874); Hemimzon sinensis (Sauvage & Dabry de Thiersant, 1874); Homaloptera sinensis (Sauvage & Darby de Thiersant, 1874)

= Jinshaia sinensis =

Species of fish

Jinshaia sinensis is a species of loach endemic to the Yangtze and the Jinsha Jiang drainages of China.
