= Pseudohomaloptera sexmaculata =

Conservation status
- Least Concern (IUCN 3.1)

Scientific classification
- Kingdom: Animalia
- Phylum: Chordata
- Class: Actinopterygii
- Order: Cypriniformes
- Family: Balitoridae
- Genus: Pseudohomaloptera
- Species: P. sexmaculata

Binomial name
- Pseudohomaloptera sexmaculata (Fowler, 1934)

Synonyms
- Homaloptera sexmaculata Fowler, 1934; Balitoropsis sexmaculata Fowler, 1934; Homaloptera septemmaculata Fowler, 1934

Species of fish

Pseudohomaloptera sexmaculata is a fish species of the genus Pseudohomaloptera in the family Balitoridae.
