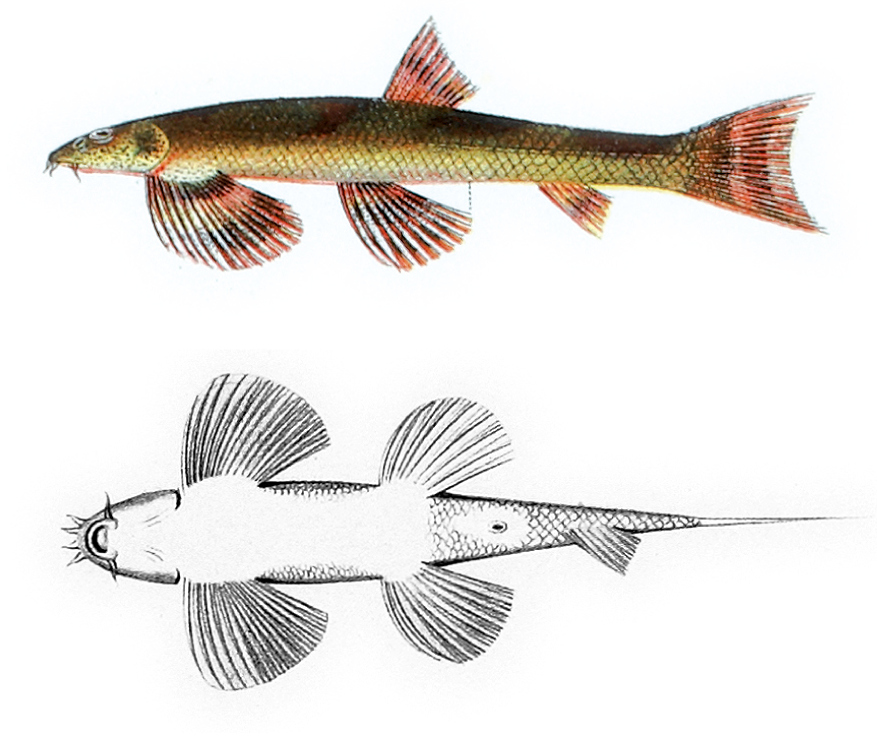

Conservation status
- Vulnerable (IUCN 3.1)

Scientific classification
- Domain: Eukaryota
- Kingdom: Animalia
- Phylum: Chordata
- Class: Actinopterygii
- Order: Cypriniformes
- Family: Balitoridae
- Genus: Homalopteroides
- Species: H. wassinkii

Binomial name
- Homalopteroides wassinkii (Bleeker, 1853)

Synonyms
- Homaloptera wassinkii Bleeker, 1853; Homaloptera fasciata Bleeker, 1860

= Homalopteroides wassinkii =

Species of fish

Homalopteroides wassinkii is a species of ray-finned fish in the genus Homalopteroides. It can be found in Sumatra, Borneo, and Java.
