= Hemimyzon pumilicorpora =

Scientific classification
- Domain: Eukaryota
- Kingdom: Animalia
- Phylum: Chordata
- Class: Actinopterygii
- Order: Cypriniformes
- Family: Balitoridae
- Genus: Hemimyzon
- Species: H. pumilicorpora

Binomial name
- Hemimyzon pumilicorpora C. Y. Zheng & W. Zhang, 1987

Species of fish

Hemimyzon pumilicorpora is a species of ray-finned fish in the genus Hemimyzon. it is a fresh water fish found in China. Males can reach up to 5.7 cm in length.

== Footnotes ==
- Froese, Rainer; Pauly, Daniel (eds.). "Hemimyzon pumilicorpora". FishBase.
