= Sinogastromyzon wui =

Conservation status
- Least Concern (IUCN 3.1)

Scientific classification
- Kingdom: Animalia
- Phylum: Chordata
- Class: Actinopterygii
- Order: Cypriniformes
- Family: Balitoridae
- Genus: Sinogastromyzon
- Species: S. wui

Binomial name
- Sinogastromyzon wui Fang, 1930

Species of fish

Sinogastromyzon wui is a species of ray-finned fish in the genus Sinogastromyzon. It is endemic to southern China including Hainan. It grows to 9.1 cm (3.6 in) SL and 14 cm (5.5 in) TL.
