= Pseudohomaloptera tatereganii =

Conservation status
- Data Deficient (IUCN 3.1)

Scientific classification
- Kingdom: Animalia
- Phylum: Chordata
- Class: Actinopterygii
- Order: Cypriniformes
- Family: Balitoridae
- Genus: Pseudohomaloptera
- Species: P. tatereganii

Binomial name
- Pseudohomaloptera tatereganii Popta, 1905

Synonyms
- Homaloptera tatereganii Popta, 1905

Species of fish

Pseudohomaloptera tatereganii is a fish species of the genus Pseudohomaloptera in the family Balitoridae.
