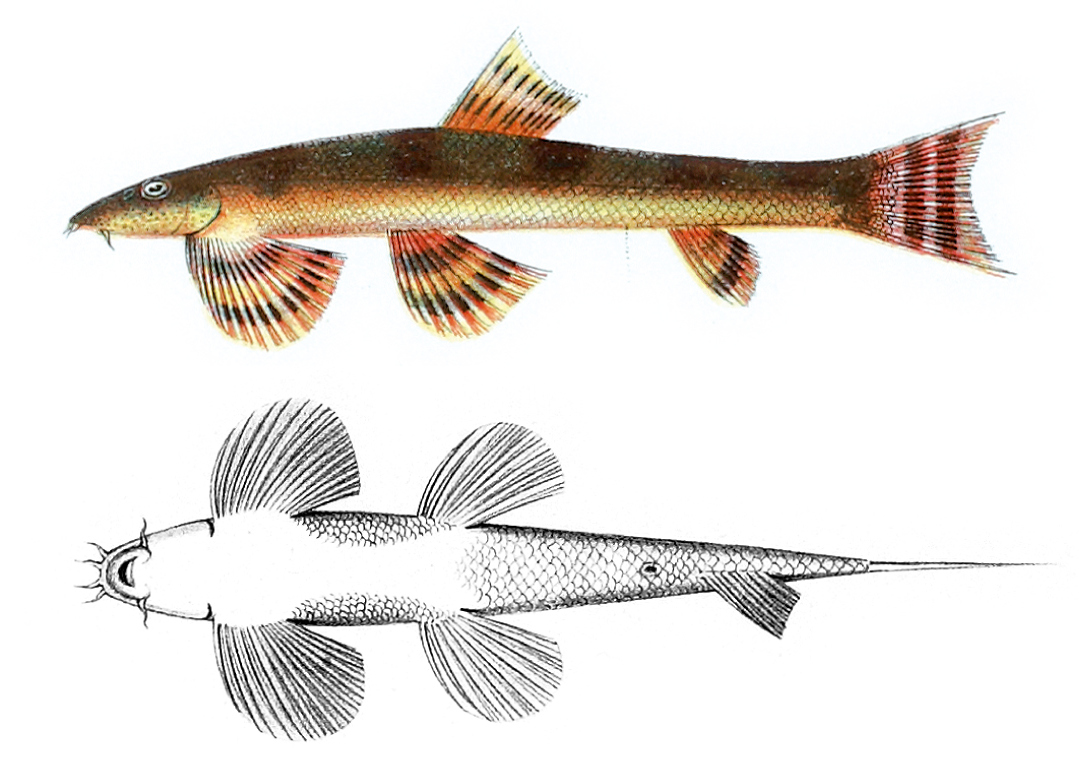

Scientific classification
- Domain: Eukaryota
- Kingdom: Animalia
- Phylum: Chordata
- Class: Actinopterygii
- Order: Cypriniformes
- Family: Balitoridae
- Genus: Homalopterula
- Species: H. gymnogaster

Binomial name
- Homalopterula gymnogaster (Bleeker, 1853)

Synonyms
- Homaloptera gymnogaster Bleeker, 1853; Homaloptera lepidogaster Weber & de Beaufort, 1916

= Homalopterula gymnogaster =

Species of fish

Homalopterula gymnogaster is a species of ray-finned fish in the genus Homalopterula. It is commonly found in freshwater lakes Maninjau in West Sumatra, Indonesia.
