= Jinshaia abbreviata =

Scientific classification
- Domain: Eukaryota
- Kingdom: Animalia
- Phylum: Chordata
- Class: Actinopterygii
- Order: Cypriniformes
- Family: Balitoridae
- Genus: Jinshaia
- Species: J. abbreviata

Binomial name
- Jinshaia abbreviata (Günther, 1892)

Synonyms
- Homaloptera abbreviata Günther, 1892; Hemimyzon abbreviate (Günther, 1892)

Species of fish

Jinshaia abbreviata is a species of hillstream loach endemic to China. It is one of two species in the genus Jinshaia.

== Habitat ==
Lives in demersal freshwater environments.
