= Sinogastromyzon chapaensis =

Conservation status
- Data Deficient (IUCN 3.1)

Scientific classification
- Kingdom: Animalia
- Phylum: Chordata
- Class: Actinopterygii
- Order: Cypriniformes
- Family: Balitoridae
- Genus: Sinogastromyzon
- Species: S. chapaensis

Binomial name
- Sinogastromyzon chapaensis Đ. Y. Mai, 1978

Species of fish

Sinogastromyzon chapaensis is a species of ray-finned fish in the genus Sinogastromyzon. It is endemic to the Red River drainage in northern Vietnam and Hunan, southern China. Very little is known about ecology of this species living in rivers.
