= Sinogastromyzon sichangensis =

Conservation status
- Least Concern (IUCN 3.1)

Scientific classification
- Kingdom: Animalia
- Phylum: Chordata
- Class: Actinopterygii
- Order: Cypriniformes
- Family: Balitoridae
- Genus: Sinogastromyzon
- Species: S. sichangensis

Binomial name
- Sinogastromyzon sichangensis H. W. Chang, 1944

Species of fish

Sinogastromyzon sichangensis is a species of ray-finned fish in the genus Sinogastromyzon. It is endemic to China and found in the upper Yangtze River system: Jinsha River and its tributaries Anning River and Qing River, in Hubei, Guizhou, Yunnan, and Sichuan provinces. It grows to 3 cm (1.2 in) SL.
