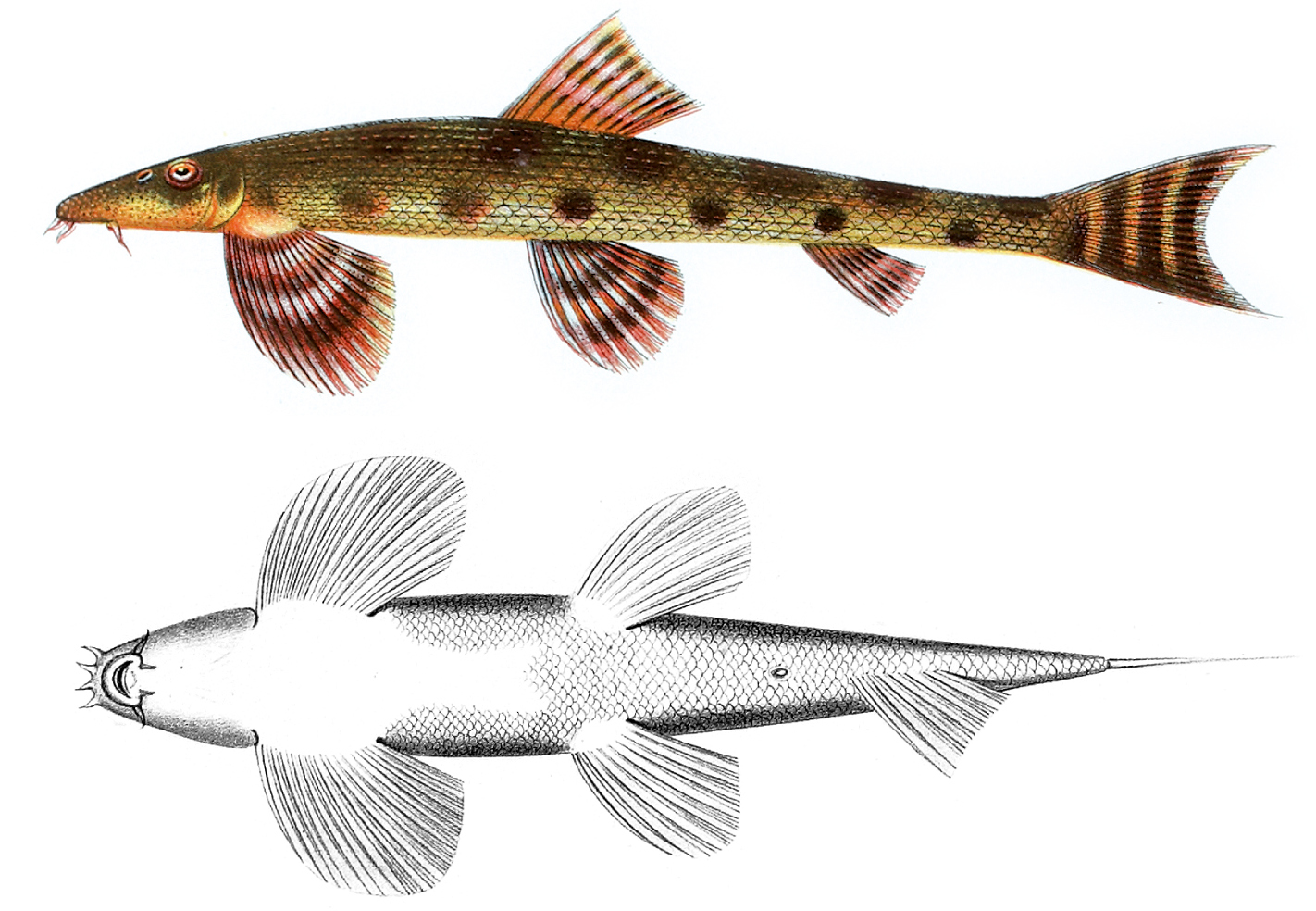

Conservation status
- Vulnerable (IUCN 3.1)

Scientific classification
- Domain: Eukaryota
- Kingdom: Animalia
- Phylum: Chordata
- Class: Actinopterygii
- Order: Cypriniformes
- Family: Balitoridae
- Genus: Homaloptera
- Species: H. ocellata

Binomial name
- Homaloptera ocellata van der Hoeven, 1833

= Homaloptera ocellata =

Species of fish

Homaloptera ocellata is a species of ray-finned fish in the genus Homaloptera found in Sumatra and Java in Indonesia.
