= Homalopteroides weberi =

Conservation status
- Data Deficient (IUCN 3.1)

Scientific classification
- Kingdom: Animalia
- Phylum: Chordata
- Class: Actinopterygii
- Order: Cypriniformes
- Family: Balitoridae
- Genus: Homalopteroides
- Species: H. weberi

Binomial name
- Homalopteroides weberi Hora, 1932

Synonyms
- Homaloptera weberi Hora, 1932

Species of fish

Homalopteroides weberi is a species of the genus Homalopteroides in the family Balitoridae. It is found in west Borneo.
