= Burmese stone loach =

Conservation status
- Least Concern (IUCN 3.1)

Scientific classification
- Kingdom: Animalia
- Phylum: Chordata
- Class: Actinopterygii
- Order: Cypriniformes
- Family: Balitoridae
- Genus: Balitora
- Species: B. burmanica

Binomial name
- Balitora burmanica Hora, 1932

Species of fish

The Burmese stone loach (Balitora burmanica) is a species of ray-finned fish in the genus Balitora. It occurs in the Irrawaddy, Salween, and Tenasserim basins in Burma, China, and Thailand. Its maximum length is 10 cm (3.9 in) TL.
