= Homalopteroides nebulosus =

Conservation status
- Least Concern (IUCN 3.1)

Scientific classification
- Domain: Eukaryota
- Kingdom: Animalia
- Phylum: Chordata
- Class: Actinopterygii
- Order: Cypriniformes
- Family: Balitoridae
- Genus: Homalopteroides
- Species: H. nebulosus

Binomial name
- Homalopteroides nebulosus (Alfred, 1969)

Synonyms
- Homaloptera nebulosa Alfred, 1969

Species of fish

Homalopteroides nebulosus is a species of ray-finned fish in the genus Homalopteroides. It can be found in Malaysia and Indonesia.
