= Pseudohomaloptera yunnanensis =

Conservation status
- Least Concern (IUCN 3.1)

Scientific classification
- Kingdom: Animalia
- Phylum: Chordata
- Class: Actinopterygii
- Order: Cypriniformes
- Family: Balitoridae
- Genus: Pseudohomaloptera
- Species: P. yunnanensis

Binomial name
- Pseudohomaloptera yunnanensis (Y. Y. Chen, 1978)

Synonyms
- Balitoropsis yunnanensis Chen, 1978; Homaloptera yunnanensis (Chen, 1978)

Species of fish

Pseudohomaloptera yunnanensis is a fish species of the genus Pseudohomaloptera in the family Balitoridae.
