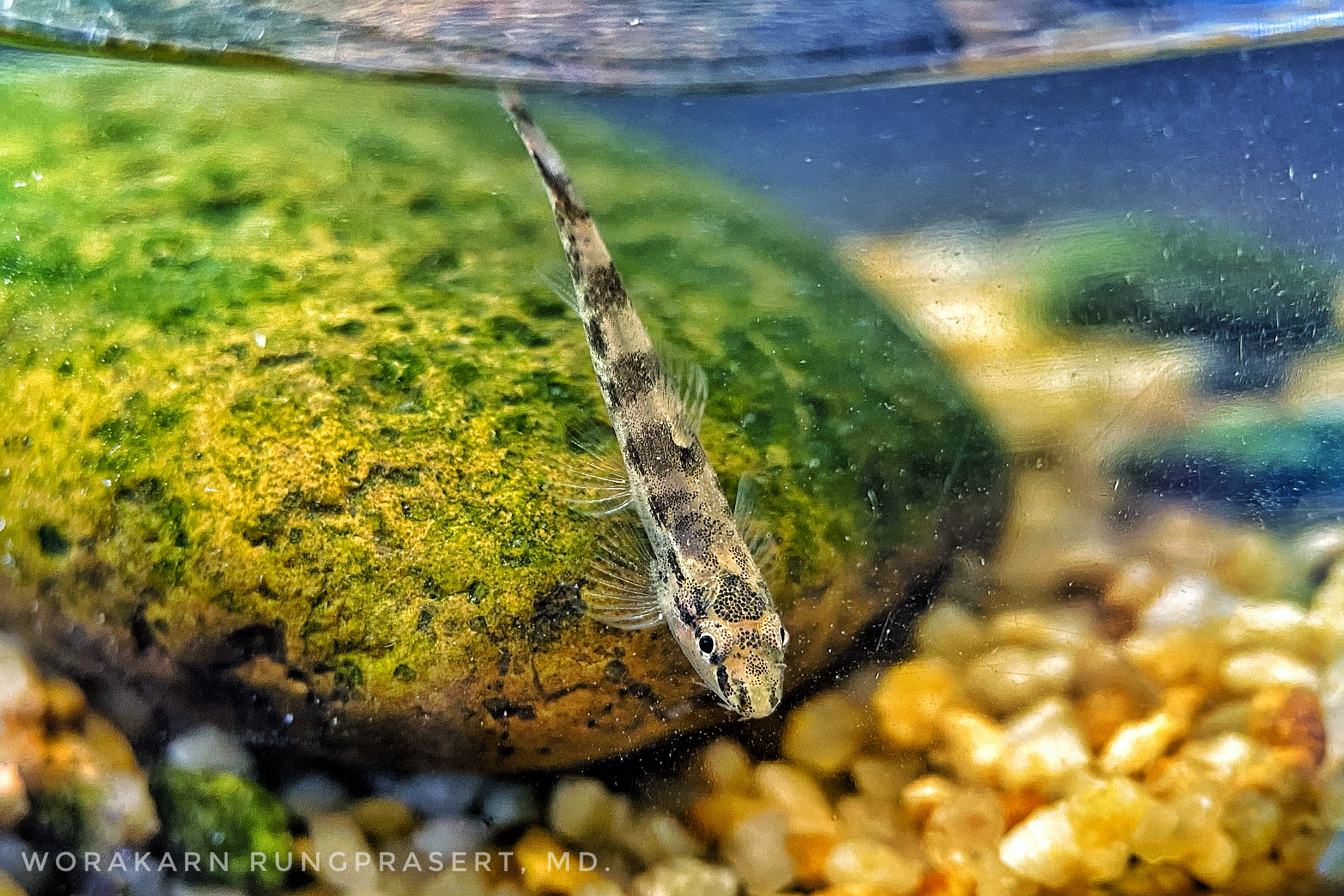

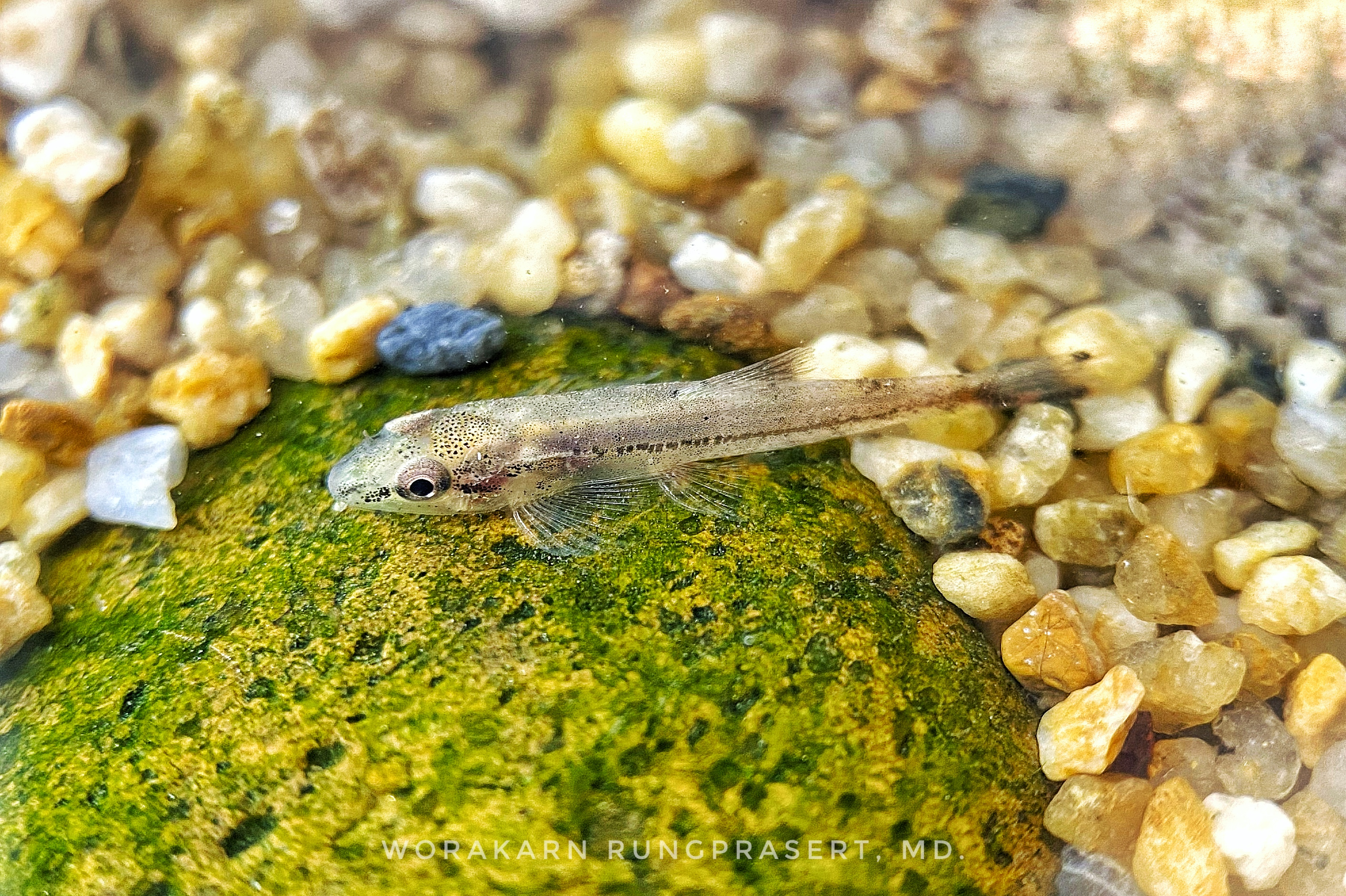

Conservation status
- Least Concern (IUCN 3.1)

Scientific classification
- Kingdom: Animalia
- Phylum: Chordata
- Class: Actinopterygii
- Order: Cypriniformes
- Family: Balitoridae
- Genus: Homalopteroides
- Species: H. tweediei

Binomial name
- Homalopteroides tweediei (Herre, 1940)

Synonyms
- Homaloptera tweediei Herre, 1940

= Homalopteroides tweediei =

Species of fish

Homalopteroides tweediei is a species of ray-finned fish in the genus Homalopteroides. It can be found in the Mekong basin, Malay Peninsula, and Borneo.
