= Homalopteroides rupicola =

Conservation status
- Least Concern (IUCN 3.1)

Scientific classification
- Domain: Eukaryota
- Kingdom: Animalia
- Phylum: Chordata
- Class: Actinopterygii
- Order: Cypriniformes
- Family: Balitoridae
- Genus: Homalopteroides
- Species: H. rupicola

Binomial name
- Homalopteroides rupicola (Prashad & Mukerji, 1929)

Synonyms
- Chopraia rupicola Prashad & Mukerji, 1929; Homaloptera rupicola (Prashad & Mukerji, 1929)

Species of fish

Homalopteroides rupicola is a species of ray-finned fish in the genus Homalopteroides. It can be found in Myanmar.
