= Hemimyzon pengi =

Scientific classification
- Domain: Eukaryota
- Kingdom: Animalia
- Phylum: Chordata
- Class: Actinopterygii
- Order: Cypriniformes
- Family: Balitoridae
- Genus: Hemimyzon
- Species: H. pengi

Binomial name
- Hemimyzon pengi (S. Y. Huang, 1982)

Synonyms
- Balitora pengi Huang, 1982

Species of fish

Hemimyzon pengi is a species of ray-finned fish in the genus Hemimyzon. Hemimyzon pengi is a freshwater fish, mainly found in China.
