= Sinogastromyzon tonkinensis =

Conservation status
- Data Deficient (IUCN 3.1)

Scientific classification
- Kingdom: Animalia
- Phylum: Chordata
- Class: Actinopterygii
- Order: Cypriniformes
- Family: Balitoridae
- Genus: Sinogastromyzon
- Species: S. tonkinensis

Binomial name
- Sinogastromyzon tonkinensis Pellegrin & Chevey, 1935

Species of fish

Sinogastromyzon tonkinensis is a species of ray-finned fish in the genus Sinogastromyzon. It is endemic to the Red River drainage in northern Vietnam and Yunnan, southern China. It grows to 3.8 cm (1.5 in) SL. Very little is known about ecology of this species that is used in some subsistence fisheries.
