= Hemimyzon khonensis =

Conservation status
- Data Deficient (IUCN 3.1)

Scientific classification
- Kingdom: Animalia
- Phylum: Chordata
- Class: Actinopterygii
- Order: Cypriniformes
- Family: Balitoridae
- Genus: Hemimyzon
- Species: H. khonensis

Binomial name
- Hemimyzon khonensis Kottelat, 2000

Species of fish

Hemimyzon khonensis is a species of hillstream loach in the genus Hemimyzon. It is known from a single specimen collected in the Mekong at the Khone Falls in Laos, near the Cambodian border; it is named for the falls. The specimen was 51 mm (2.0 in) in standard length.
