= Sinogastromyzon puliensis =

Conservation status
- Vulnerable (IUCN 2.3)

Scientific classification
- Kingdom: Animalia
- Phylum: Chordata
- Class: Actinopterygii
- Order: Cypriniformes
- Family: Balitoridae
- Genus: Sinogastromyzon
- Species: S. puliensis

Binomial name
- Sinogastromyzon puliensis Y. S. Liang, 1974

Species of fish

Sinogastromyzon puliensis is a species of ray-finned fish in the family Balitoridae. It is endemic to Taiwan. It is found in the Kaoping, Tsengwen, Choshui, Tatu, and Tachia Rivers in the western half of the island. It prefers running waters at low to middle elevations. Its maximum length is 10 cm (3.9 in).

== See also ==
- List of protected species in Taiwan
- List of endemic species of Taiwan
