= Balitora nantingensis =

Scientific classification
- Kingdom: Animalia
- Phylum: Chordata
- Class: Actinopterygii
- Order: Cypriniformes
- Family: Balitoridae
- Genus: Balitora
- Species: B. nantingensis

Binomial name
- Balitora nantingensis X. Y. Chen, G. H. Cui & J. X. Yang, 2005

Species of fish

Balitora nantingensis is a species of ray-finned fish in the genus Balitora.

== Footnotes ==
- Froese, Rainer; Pauly, Daniel (eds.). "Balitora nantingensis". FishBase.
