= Homalopterula ripleyi =

Scientific classification
- Domain: Eukaryota
- Kingdom: Animalia
- Phylum: Chordata
- Class: Actinopterygii
- Order: Cypriniformes
- Family: Balitoridae
- Genus: Homalopterula
- Species: H. ripleyi

Binomial name
- Homalopterula ripleyi Fowler, 1940

Synonyms
- Homaloptera ripleyi (Fowler, 1940)

Species of fish

Homalopterula ripleyi is a species of ray-finned fish in the genus Homalopterula.
