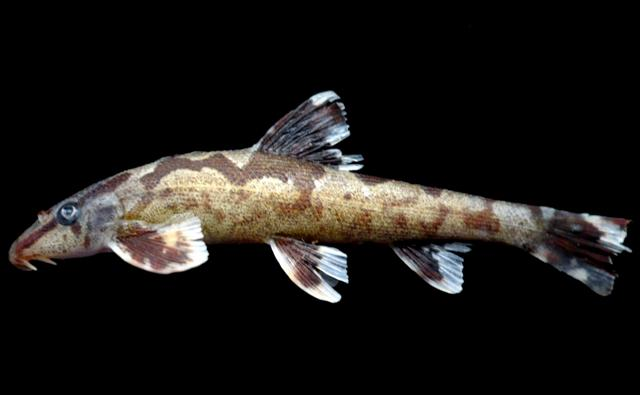

Conservation status
- Data Deficient (IUCN 3.1)

Scientific classification
- Domain: Eukaryota
- Kingdom: Animalia
- Phylum: Chordata
- Class: Actinopterygii
- Order: Cypriniformes
- Family: Balitoridae
- Genus: Homaloptera
- Species: H. bilineata

Binomial name
- Homaloptera bilineata Blyth, 1860

Synonyms
- Nemacheilus serpentarius Day, 1870

= Homaloptera bilineata =

Species of fish

Homaloptera bilineata is a species of ray-finned fish in the genus Homaloptera found in Myanmar and Thailand.
