= Balitora meridionalis =

Conservation status
- Data Deficient (IUCN 3.1)

Scientific classification
- Kingdom: Animalia
- Phylum: Chordata
- Class: Actinopterygii
- Order: Cypriniformes
- Family: Balitoridae
- Genus: Balitora
- Species: B. meridionalis

Binomial name
- Balitora meridionalis Kottelat, 1988

Species of fish

Balitora meridionalis is a species of ray-finned fish in the genus Balitora.
