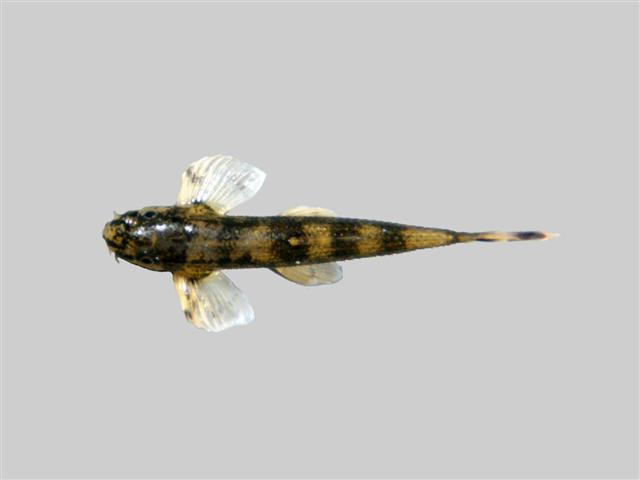

Conservation status
- Least Concern (IUCN 3.1)

Scientific classification
- Kingdom: Animalia
- Phylum: Chordata
- Class: Actinopterygii
- Order: Cypriniformes
- Family: Balitoridae
- Genus: Pseudohomaloptera
- Species: P. leonardi

Binomial name
- Pseudohomaloptera leonardi (Hora, 1941)

Synonyms
- Homaloptera leonardi Hora, 1941; Balitoropsis leonardi (Hora, 1941)

= Pseudohomaloptera leonardi =

Species of fish

Pseudohomaloptera leonardi is a fish species of the genus Pseudohomaloptera in the family Balitoridae. It lives in South East Asia.
