= Balitora annamitica =

Conservation status
- Least Concern (IUCN 3.1)

Scientific classification
- Kingdom: Animalia
- Phylum: Chordata
- Class: Actinopterygii
- Order: Cypriniformes
- Family: Balitoridae
- Genus: Balitora
- Species: B. annamitica

Binomial name
- Balitora annamitica Kottelat, 1988

Species of freshwater fish from south-east Asia

Balitora annamitica is a species of hill-stream loach from the Mekong River Basin in Cambodia, Thailand, and Laos, and possibly Vietnam. It might be more than one species.

Balitora annamitica grow to 12.0 cm (4.7 in) TL. It occurs in rapids and stretches of rivers with fast flow. It is locally common and present in subsistence fisheries.
