= Hemimyzon ecdyonuroides =

Conservation status
- Data Deficient (IUCN 3.1)

Scientific classification
- Kingdom: Animalia
- Phylum: Chordata
- Class: Actinopterygii
- Order: Cypriniformes
- Family: Balitoridae
- Genus: Hemimyzon
- Species: H. ecdyonuroides

Binomial name
- Hemimyzon ecdyonuroides Freyhof & Herder, 2002

Species of fish

Hemimyzon ecdyonuroides is a species of hillstream loach (a ray-finned fish) in the genus Hemimyzon. It is known from two tributaries of the Mekong, from Sekong River and Sesan River drainages in Vietnam and Laos.
