= Sinogastromyzon nanpanjiangensis =

Scientific classification
- Kingdom: Animalia
- Phylum: Chordata
- Class: Actinopterygii
- Order: Cypriniformes
- Family: Balitoridae
- Genus: Sinogastromyzon
- Species: S. nanpanjiangensis

Binomial name
- Sinogastromyzon nanpanjiangensis W. X. Li, 1987

Species of fish

Sinogastromyzon nanpanjiangensis is a species of ray-finned fish in the genus Sinogastromyzon. It is endemic to Yunnan, China, where it is known from its type locality, the Nanpan River. It grows to 5.5 cm (2.2 in) SL.
