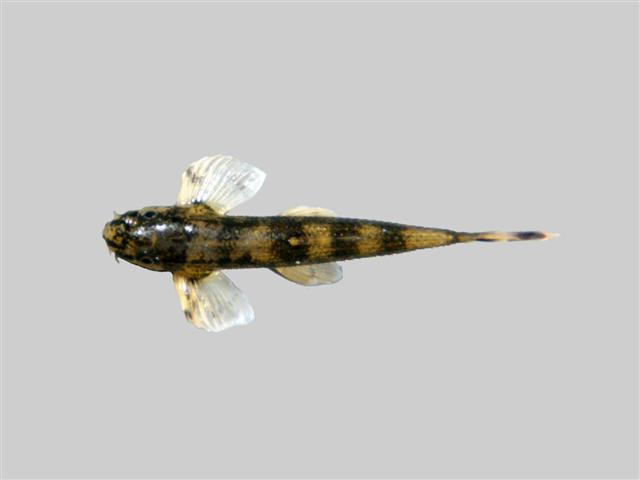
- Pseudohomaloptera leonardi

Scientific classification
- Kingdom: Animalia
- Phylum: Chordata
- Class: Actinopterygii
- Order: Cypriniformes
- Family: Balitoridae
- Genus: Pseudohomaloptera; Silas, 1953

Type species
- Homaloptera tatereganii Popta, 1905

= Pseudohomaloptera =

Genus of fishes

Pseudohomaloptera is a genus of freshwater ray-finned fish belonging to the family Balitoridae, the river or hillstream loaches. The species in this genus are found in eastern Asia.

== Species ==
There are seven recognized species in this genus:

- Pseudohomaloptera batek H. H. Tan, 2009
- Pseudohomaloptera leonardi Hora, 1941
- Pseudohomaloptera sexmaculata Fowler, 1934
- Pseudohomaloptera tatereganii Popta, 1905
- Pseudohomaloptera tecta Randall, Somarriba, Tongnunui & Page, 2022
- Pseudohomaloptera vulgaris Kottelat & X. L. Chu, 1988
- Pseudohomaloptera yunnanensis Y. Y. Chen, 1978
