= Lepturichthys =

Scientific classification
- Kingdom: Animalia
- Phylum: Chordata
- Class: Actinopterygii
- Order: Cypriniformes
- Family: Balitoridae
- Genus: Lepturichthys; Regan, 1911

Type species
- Homaloptera fimbriata Günther, 1888

Genus of fishes

Lepturichthys is a genus of freshwater ray-finned fishes belonging to the family Balitoridae, the loaches in this family are commonly known as hillstream loaches although this name also refers to the loaches in the family Gastromyzontidae. These loaches are endemic to China.

== Species ==
There are currently two recognized species in this genus:

- Lepturichthys dolichopterus D. Y. Dai, 1985
- Lepturichthys fimbriata (Günther, 1888)
