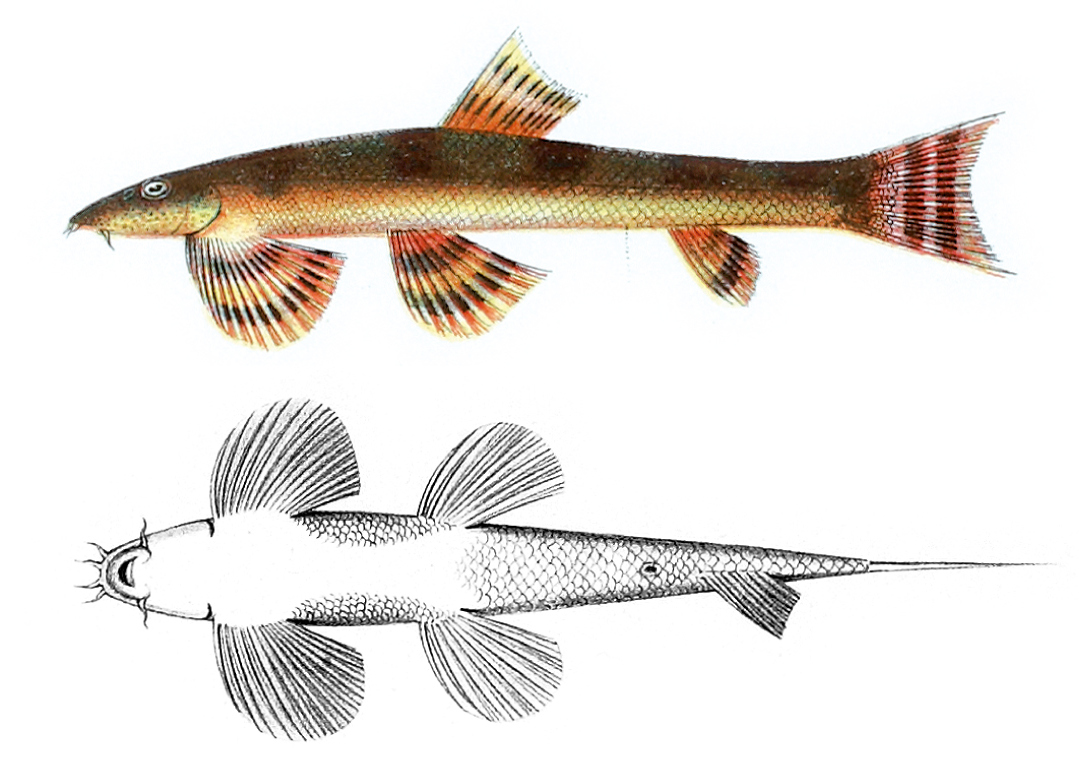
- Homalopterula gymnogaster

Scientific classification
- Kingdom: Animalia
- Phylum: Chordata
- Class: Actinopterygii
- Order: Cypriniformes
- Family: Balitoridae
- Genus: Homalopterula; Fowler, 1940

Type species
- Homalopterula ripleyi Fowler, 1940

= Homalopterula =

Genus of fishes

Homalopterula is a genus of freshwater ray-finned fishes belonging to the family Balitoridae, the loaches in this family are commonly known as hillstream loaches although this name also refers to the loaches in the family Gastromyzontidae. These loaches are found only in Sumatra in Indonesia.

== Species ==
There are currently 6 recognized species in this genus:

- Homalopterula amphisquamata M. C. W. Weber & de Beaufort, 1916
- Homalopterula gymnogaster Bleeker, 1853
- Homalopterula heterolepis M. C. W. Weber & de Beaufort, 1916
- Homalopterula modiglianii Perugia, 1893
- Homalopterula ripleyi Fowler, 1940
- Homalopterula vanderbilti Fowler, 1940
