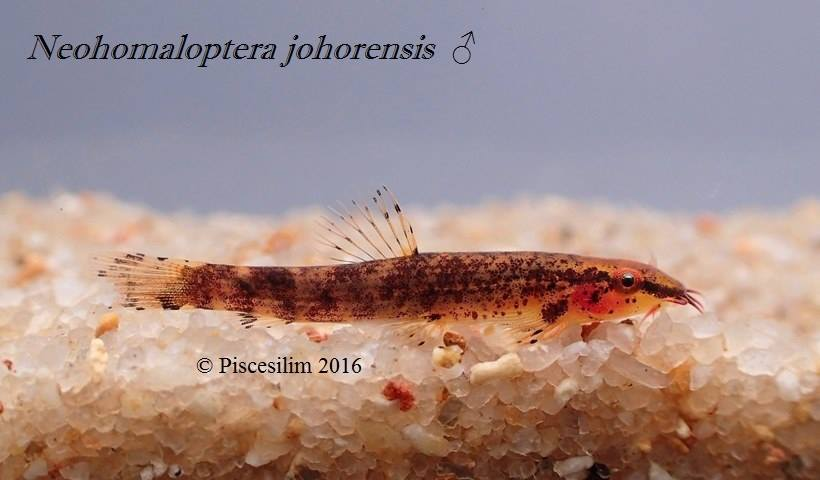

Conservation status
- Least Concern (IUCN 3.1)

Scientific classification
- Kingdom: Animalia
- Phylum: Chordata
- Class: Actinopterygii
- Order: Cypriniformes
- Family: Balitoridae
- Genus: Neohomaloptera; Herre, 1944
- Species: N. johorensis

Binomial name
- Neohomaloptera johorensis (Herre, 1944)

Synonyms
- Homaloptera johorensis Herre, 1944

= Neohomaloptera =

Genus of fishes

Neohomaloptera johorensis is a species of dwarf hillstream loach, it is the only member of its genus Neohomaloptera.

Named after the state it was discovered in, Johor, Malaysia. Although, it can still be found outside of the state. The species is previously known from only two specimens, the holotype and a topotype, both collected in 1940.

== Description ==
A very streamlined fish, growing to around 1.7 – 2.5 cm as adults.

The distinguishing feature of the genus from its family, Balitoridae is by the 3 pair of barbels, instead of 1 barbel on each corner of the mouth. Also, the pectoral rays number at 12 or 13 instead of 14 to 20, with 3 or 4 simple rays instead of 4 to 8. Finally, the ventral rays reduced to 7 instead of 8 to 10. The caudal is slightly rounded and the caudal peduncle is short and as deep as long.

Specimens from blackwater habitats appear much more orange than clearwater specimens.

== Distribution ==
Possibly used to be wildly spread across Peninsular Malaysia before, now only found in Johor, the North Selangor peat swamp forest, Selangor state and Perak. Its now smaller range is probably due to the degradation of peat swamps across Peninsular Malaysia.

Specimens have also been collected from the Kapuas River basin, and in West Kalimantan of Indonesian Borneo.

== Habitat ==
Most often found in black water habitats with lots of vegetation such as blackwater streams or pools, and often caught in congregations around areas of streams where there is more current, possibly attracted to the more oxygenated water.

== Diet ==
In the wild it can be seen grazing on biofilm, but it is also a micropredator that preys on small crustaceans, insect larvae and other aquatic invertebrates.
