= Sinogastromyzon =

Scientific classification
- Kingdom: Animalia
- Phylum: Chordata
- Class: Actinopterygii
- Order: Cypriniformes
- Family: Balitoridae
- Genus: Sinogastromyzon; P. W. Fang, 1930

Type species
- Sinogastromyzon wui P. W. Fang, 1930

Genus of fishes

Sinogastromyzon is a genus of hillstream loaches native to eastern Asia.

IUCN has assessed conservation status of 14 Sinogastromyzon species. Of these, ten are considered "Data Deficient", three of "Least Concern", and one (S. puliensis) "Vulnerable".

== Species ==
There is some dispute over the species in this genus. This list derives primarily from the work of Kottelat, 2012, with the addition of subsequently described species. There are currently 21 recognized species in this genus:

- Sinogastromyzon chapaensis Đ. Y. Mai, 1978
- Sinogastromyzon daduheensis Y. S. Guo & Jun Yang, 2013
- Sinogastromyzon daon V. H. Nguyễn, 2005 (species inquirenda in this genus)
- Sinogastromyzon dezeensis W. X. Li, W. N. Mao & Zong-Min Lu, 1999
- Sinogastromyzon hagiangensis V. H. Nguyễn, 2005 (species inquirenda in this genus)
- Sinogastromyzon hsiashiensis P. W. Fang, 1931
- Sinogastromyzon hypercorpus V. H. Nguyễn, 2005 (species inquirenda in this genus)
- Sinogastromyzon lixianjiangensis S. W. Liu, X. Y. Chen & J. X. Yang, 2010
- Sinogastromyzon macrostoma S. W. Liu, X. Y. Chen & J. X. Yang, 2010
- Sinogastromyzon maon V. H. Nguyễn & H. D. Nguyễn, 2005 (species inquirenda in this genus)
- Sinogastromyzon minutus Đ. Y. Mai, 1978 (species inquirenda in this genus)
- Sinogastromyzon multiocellum V. H. Nguyễn, 2005
- Sinogastromyzon namnaensis V. H. Nguyễn, 2005
- Sinogastromyzon nanpanjiangensis W. X. Li, 1987
- Sinogastromyzon nantaiensis I. S. Chen, C. C. Han & L. S. Fang, 2002
- Sinogastromyzon puliensis Y. S. Liang, 1974
- Sinogastromyzon rugocauda Đ. Y. Mai, 1978
- Sinogastromyzon sichangensis H. W. Chang, 1944
- Sinogastromyzon szechuanensis P. W. Fang, 1930
- Sinogastromyzon tonkinensis Pellegrin & Chevey, 1935
- Sinogastromyzon wui P. W. Fang, 1930
