= Homalopterula vanderbilti =

Scientific classification
- Domain: Eukaryota
- Kingdom: Animalia
- Phylum: Chordata
- Class: Actinopterygii
- Order: Cypriniformes
- Family: Balitoridae
- Genus: Homalopterula
- Species: H. vanderbilti

Binomial name
- Homalopterula vanderbilti (Fowler, 1940)

Synonyms
- Homaloptera vanderbilti Fowler, 1940; Homaloptera ulmeri Fowler, 1940

Species of fish

Homalopterula vanderbilti is a species of ray-finned fish in the genus Homalopterula.
