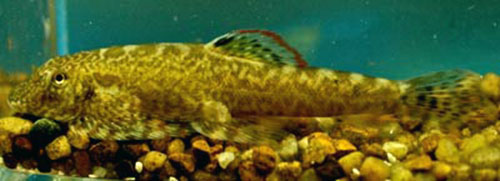
- Jinshaia sinensis

Scientific classification
- Kingdom: Animalia
- Phylum: Chordata
- Class: Actinopterygii
- Order: Cypriniformes
- Family: Balitoridae
- Genus: Jinshaia; Kottelat & X. L. Chu, 1988

Type species
- Psilorhynchus sinensis Sauvage & Dabry de Thiersant, 1874

= Jinshaia =

Genus of fishes

Jinshaia is a genus of freshwater ray-finned fishes belonging to the family Balitoridae, the loaches in this family are commonly known as hillstream loaches although this name also refers to the loaches in the family Gastromyzontidae. These loaches are endemic to China.

== Species ==
There are currently two recognized species in this genus:

- Jinshaia abbreviata (Günther, 1892)
- Jinshaia sinensis (Sauvage & Dabry de Thiersant, 1874)
