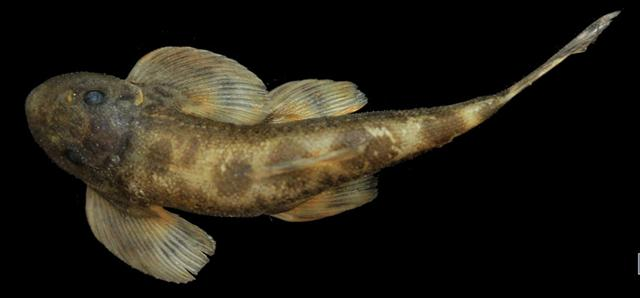

Conservation status
- Data Deficient (IUCN 3.1)

Scientific classification
- Kingdom: Animalia
- Phylum: Chordata
- Class: Actinopterygii
- Order: Cypriniformes
- Family: Balitoridae
- Genus: Hemimyzon
- Species: H. nanensis

Binomial name
- Hemimyzon nanensis A. Doi & Kottelat, 1998

= Hemimyzon nanensis =

Species of fish

Hemimyzon nanensis is a species of hillstream loach in the genus Hemimyzon. It occurs in the Chao Phraya basin, Thailand.

== Footnotes ==
- Froese, Rainer; Pauly, Daniel (eds.). "Hemimyzon nanensis". FishBase.
