= Bhavania =

- Western Ghats loach (Bhavania australis)

Scientific classification
- Kingdom: Animalia
- Phylum: Chordata
- Class: Actinopterygii
- Order: Cypriniformes
- Family: Balitoridae
- Genus: Bhavania; Hora, 1920

Type species
- Platycara australis Jerdon, 1849

Genus of fishes

Bhavania is a genus of freshwater ray-finned fishes belonging to the family Balitoridae, the loaches in this family are commonly known as hillstream loaches although this name also refers to the loaches in the family Gastromyzontidae. The loaches in this genus are found in southern India.

== Species ==
Bhavania contains three species:

- Bhavania annandalei Hora, 1920
- Balitora arunachalensis (Nath, Dam, Bhutia, Dey & Das, 2007)
- Bhavania australis (Jerdon, 1849) (Western Ghats loach)

B. arunachalensis is regarded as a species inquirenda and incertae sedis.
