= Metahomaloptera =

Scientific classification
- Kingdom: Animalia
- Phylum: Chordata
- Class: Actinopterygii
- Order: Cypriniformes
- Family: Balitoridae
- Genus: Metahomaloptera; H. W. Chang, 1944

Type species
- Metahomaloptera omeiensis H. W. Chang, 1944

Genus of fishes

Metahomaloptera is a genus of freshwater ray-finned fishes belonging to the family Balitoridae, the loaches in this family are commonly known as hillstream loaches although this name also refers to the loaches in the family Gastromyzontidae. These loaches are endemic to China.

== Species ==
There are currently two recognized species in this genus:

- Metahomaloptera longicauda Jian Yang, X. Y. Chen & J. X. Yang, 2007
- Metahomaloptera omeiensis H. W. Chang, 1944
