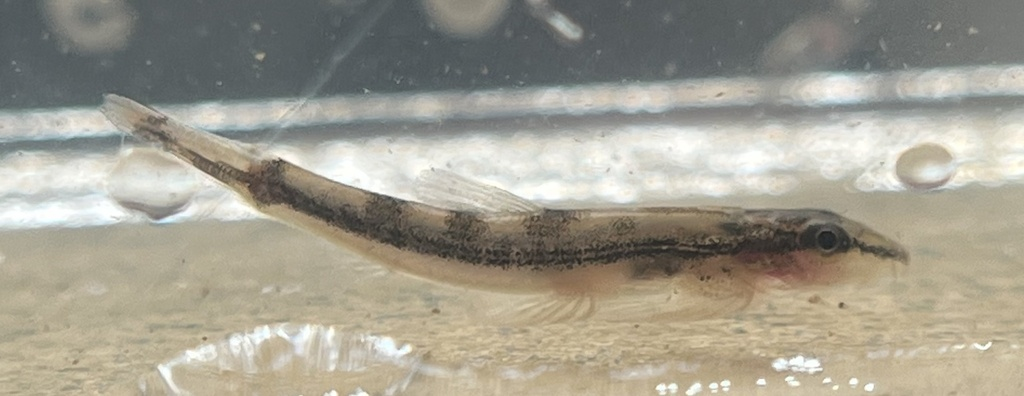
- Homalopteroides tweediei

Scientific classification
- Kingdom: Animalia
- Phylum: Chordata
- Class: Actinopterygii
- Order: Cypriniformes
- Family: Balitoridae
- Genus: Homalopteroides; Fowler, 1905

Type species
- Homaloptera wassinkii Bleeker, 1853

Synonyms
- Chopraia Prashad & Mukerji, 1929

= Homalopteroides =

Genus of fishes

Homalopteroides is a genus of freshwater ray-finned fishes belonging to the family Balitoridae, the loaches in this family are commonly known as hillstream loaches although this name also refers to the loaches in the family Gastromyzontidae. These loaches are found in Southeast Asia.

== Species ==
There are currently 13 recognized species in this genus:

- Homalopteroides avii Z. S. Randall & Page 2014
- Homalopteroides indochinensis Silas, 1953
- Homalopteroides lineatus (Smith, 1945)
- Homalopteroides manipurensis (Arunkumar, 1999)
- Homalopteroides modestus Vinciguerra, 1890
- Homalopteroides nebulosus Alfred, 1969
- Homalopteroides rupicola Prashad & Mukerji, 1929
- Homalopteroides smithi Hora, 1932
- Homalopteroides stephensoni Hora, 1932
- Homalopteroides tweediei Herre, 1940
- Homalopteroides wassinkii Bleeker, 1853
- Homalopteroides weberi Hora, 1932
- Homalopteroides yuwonoi Kottelat, 1998
