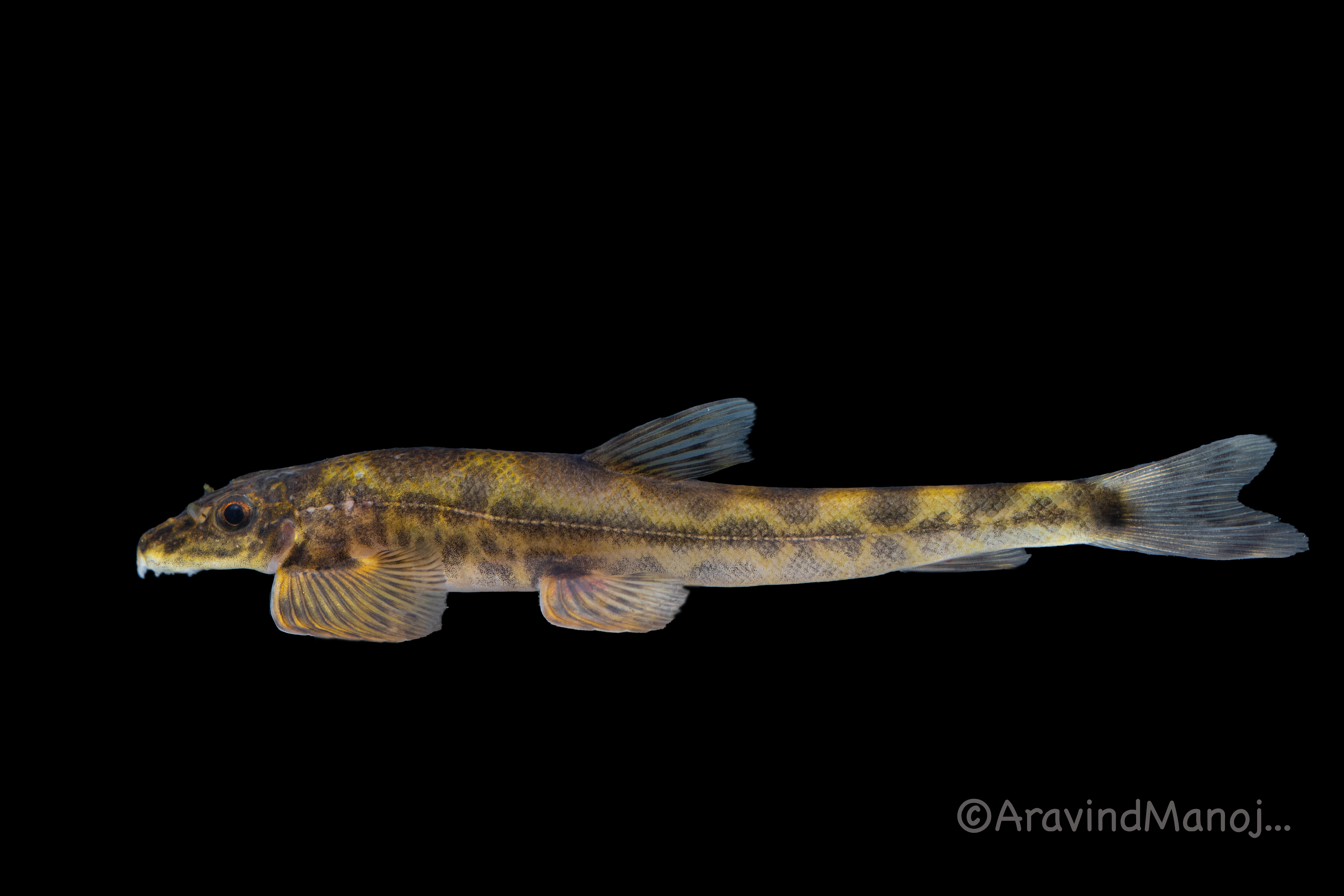
- T. jonesi

Scientific classification
- Domain: Eukaryota
- Kingdom: Animalia
- Phylum: Chordata
- Class: Actinopterygii
- Order: Cypriniformes
- Family: Balitoridae
- Genus: Travancoria; Hora, 1941

Type species
- Travancoria jonesi Hora 1941

= Travancoria =

Genus of fishes

Travancoria is a small genus of hillstream loaches endemic to India.

== Species ==
There are currently two recognized species in this genus:

- Travancoria elongata Pethiyagoda & Kottelat, 1994
- Travancoria jonesi Hora, 1941 (Travancore loach)
