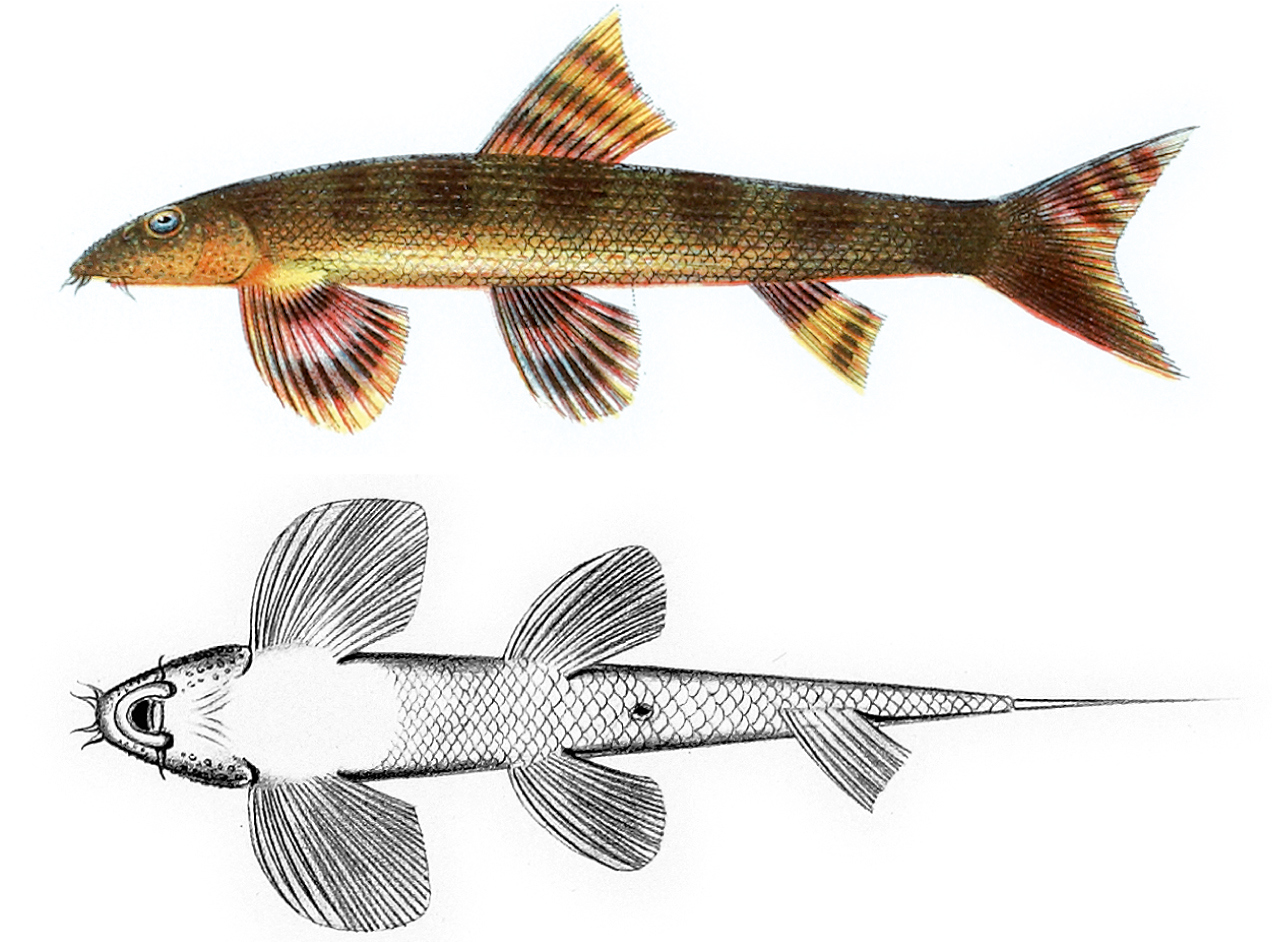
- Balitoropsis zollingeri

Scientific classification
- Kingdom: Animalia
- Phylum: Chordata
- Class: Actinopterygii
- Order: Cypriniformes
- Family: Balitoridae
- Genus: Balitoropsis; H. M. Smith, 1945

Type species
- Balitoropsis bartschi H. M. Smith 1945

= Balitoropsis =

Genus of fishes

Balitoropsis also known as the lizard loaches is a genus of freshwater ray-finned fishes belonging to the family Balitoridae, the loaches in this family are commonly known as hillstream loaches although this name also refers to the loaches in the family Gastromyzontidae. These loaches are found in mainland Southeast Asia, Sumatra and Borneo.

== Species ==
There are currently 2 recognized species in this genus:

- Balitoropsis ophiolepis (Bleeker, 1853) (slender lizard loach)
- Balitoropsis zollingeri (Bleeker, 1853) (black lizard loach)
