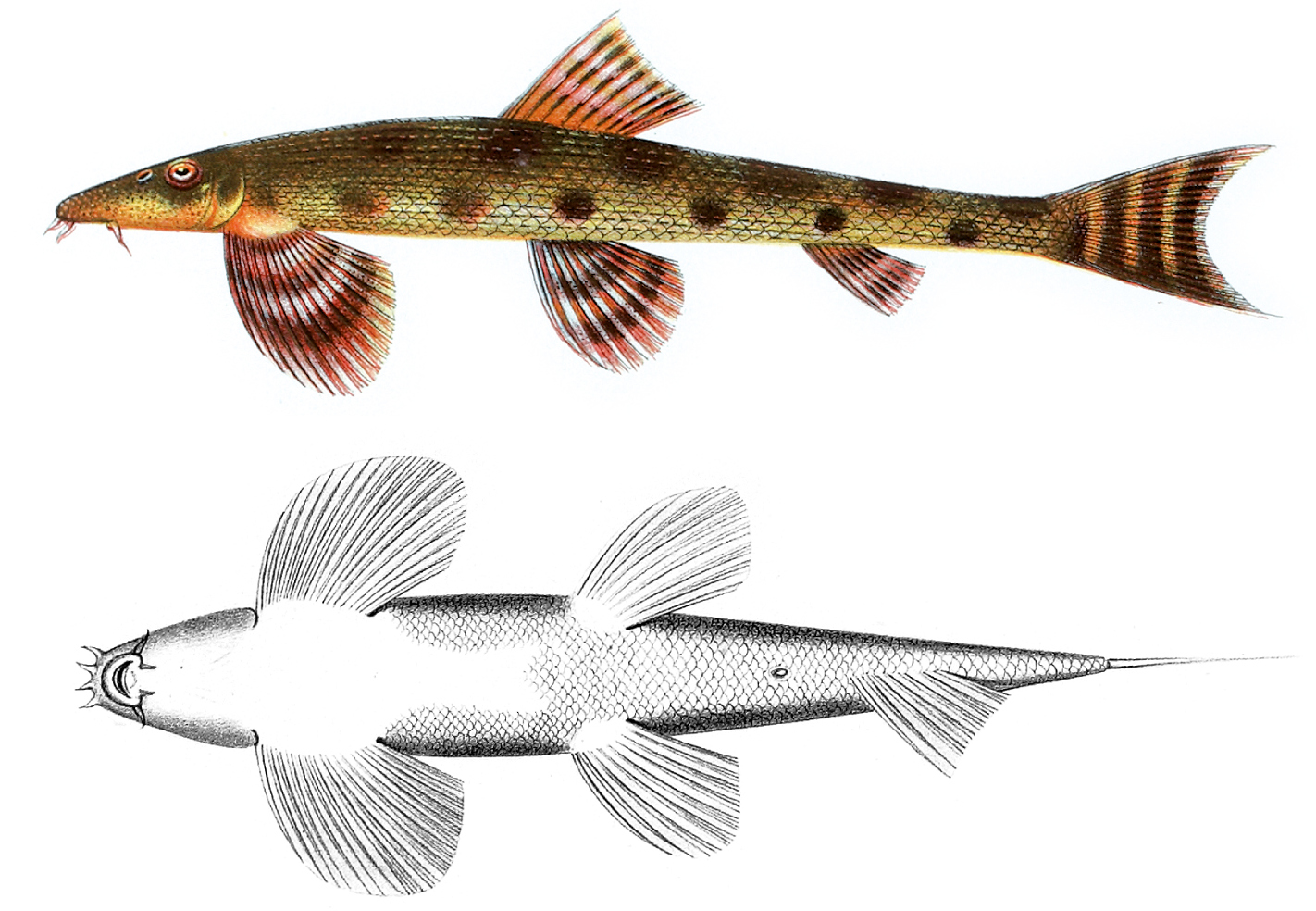
- Homaloptera ocellata

Scientific classification
- Kingdom: Animalia
- Phylum: Chordata
- Class: Actinopterygii
- Order: Cypriniformes
- Family: Balitoridae
- Genus: Homaloptera van Hasselt, 1823

Type species
- *Homaloptera ocellata Van der Hoeven, 1833

Synonyms
- Helgia Vinciguerra, 1890

= Homaloptera =

Genus of fishes

Homaloptera is a genus of ray-finned fish in the family Balitoridae.

== Species ==
There are currently 6 recognized species in this genus:

- Homaloptera bilineata Blyth, 1860
- Homaloptera confuzona Kottelat, 2000
- Homaloptera ocellata van der Hoeven, 1833
- Homaloptera ogilviei Alfred, 1967
- Homaloptera orthogoniata Vaillant, 1902
- Homaloptera parclitella H. H. Tan & P. K. L. Ng, 2005
