= Liu Shuwei =

Chinese economist and researcher

- Born: December 1952 (age 73); China, Harbin, Heilongjiang
- Resting place: Beijing
- Education: Master's Degree in economics
- Occupations: Central University of Finance and Economics Director and Researcher of China Enterprise Research Center
- Awards: 2002 Touching China Annual Person of the Year Award; 2003 National May 1st Labor Medal

Liu Shuwei (Chinese: 刘姝威; born December 1952) is a Chinese economist and researcher, best known for her role in exposing financial irregularities in the early 2000s. She is currently the Director of the China Enterprise Research Center at the Central University of Finance and Economics in Beijing. Liu Shuwei born in Harbin, Heilongjiang Province. She graduated from Heilongjiang University in March 1980. In October 1984, she began her graduate studies in the Department of Economics at Peking University, studying under prominent economists Chen Daisun and Li Yining. Her academic focus was on financial theory, and she received her master's degree in 1986.

Since then, Liu has worked as a researcher at the Central University of Finance and Economics (formerly the Central Institute of Finance and Banking), specializing in credit theory. Liu gained national recognition in 2001 when she published a short 600-character article titled Loans to Lantian Co. Must Be Stopped Immediately, in which she raised concerns about financial misconduct at Lantian Co., a major Chinese agribusiness firm. Her public criticism ultimately led to the collapse and bankruptcy of Lantian Group, and her actions were widely regarded as a landmark moment for financial accountability in China. In 2002, Liu was named one of China's "Touching China Annual Person of the Year Award", a national honor recognizing individuals for extraordinary contributions to society. The following year, in 2003, she was awarded the prestigious May 1 Labor Medal.

== Financial investigation ==
Liu Shuwei is known for actively participating in real-world financial investigations rather than remaining solely within academia. Her work in exposing corporate fraud and financial misconduct has gained her significant media attention and made her a controversial public figure in China.

=== Lantian Case ===
While working on her book Techniques for Identifying False Financial Statements of Listed Companies, Liu focused her research on the financial situation of Lantian Co., a publicly listed agricultural company. During her investigation, she discovered that Lantian had extremely weak short-term solvency, high leverage, and was heavily dependent on loans to survive—posing serious financial risks. In response, Liu Shuwei wrote a short article of approximately 600 Chinese characters titled Loans to Lantian Co. Must Be Stopped Immediately.

On October 26, 2001, the article was published in Financial Internal Reference (《金融内参》), a classified newsletter circulated only among senior officials at the Central Financial Work Committee and the People's Bank of China. Shortly after the article's publication, under central government guidance, banks ceased issuing loans to Lantian, directly leading to what later became known nationwide as the "Lantian Incident." During the investigation of Lantian by regulatory authorities, Liu Shuwei received threats from the company, including death threats and legal action. Despite the pressure, she refused to back down and stood by her findings. Her testimony became a key part of the eventual exposure and collapse of Lantian. Her courage in confronting corporate and political power led to her recognition as one of CCTV's Touching China Annual Person of the Year Award Persons of the Year in 2002 and the recipient of the May 1st Labor Medal in 2003.

=== LeEco Case ===
In 2015, Liu Shuwei criticized LeEco (Leshi Internet Information & Technology Corp), describing the company's rapid rise as a "scam" after a detailed financial analysis. Key points of her analysis included:

- The board and executive team lacked the professional background and academic qualifications necessary to achieve their ambitious global vision.
- LeEco's profitability was declining, and its "ecosystem" strategy showed signs of collapse.
- Major shareholders were cashing out through questionable means under various pretexts.
- The company's core content offerings were unremarkable and inconsistent with its reported financial performance.

Her warnings proved prescient, as LeEco fell into severe financial crisis starting in 2017.

=== Baoneng Case ===
On January 30, 2018, Liu Shuwei an open letter addressed to the China Securities Regulatory Commission (CSRC), and its chairman Liu Shiyu. In the letter, she expressed concerns over Baoneng Group's subsidiary, Jushenghua, which held a 10.34% stake in Vanke through nine asset management plans. Liu pointed out that seven of those plans had expired and requested that the CSRC order immediate liquidation of the expired plans to prevent extension. Jushenghua responded that it had already signed supplemental agreements to extend the clearing period of the plans, in accordance with relevant laws and regulations. In April 2018, Liu Shuwei further criticized Baoneng Group, accusing it of manipulating large sums of insurance and bank capital through opaque and potentially illegal means to engage in hostile takeovers, property speculation, and stock market manipulation—actions she believed posed threats to China's real economy. She called for the seizure of Baoneng's gains and shares, recommending they be returned to the state.

Liu identified three allegedly illegal sources of Baoneng's capital:

- Control of Qianhai Life Insurance through proxy holding arrangements, under suspicious internal conditions.
- Irregular financing from Zhejiang Commercial Bank, implying collusion with financial institutions.
- Questionable land transactions with China Resources during the tenure of its former chairman, Song Lin, who had been dismissed and investigated for serious disciplinary violations.
