= Hemimyzon formosanus =

Scientific classification
- Kingdom: Animalia
- Phylum: Chordata
- Class: Actinopterygii
- Order: Cypriniformes
- Family: Balitoridae
- Genus: Hemimyzon
- Species: H. formosanus

Binomial name
- Hemimyzon formosanus (Boulenger, 1894)

Synonyms
- Homaloptera formosana Boulenger, 1894

Species of fish

Hemimyzon formosanus is a species of hillstream loach (a ray-finned fish) in the genus Hemimyzon. It is endemic to western portion of Central Mountain Range of Taiwan. Its maximum length is 10 cm (3.9 in). Variations in nucleotide sequences within the mitochondrial control region show strong geographic structuring suggestive of a cryptic species complex.
