= Fang Ping-Wen =

Chinese ichthyologist (1903–1944)

Ping-Wen Fang
- 方炳文
- Born: 1903; She County, Anhui, Qing China
- Died: 26 August 1944 (aged 40–41); Paris, German-occupied France
- Known for: Pioneering research on Chinese freshwater fishes
- Scientific career
- Fields: Ichthyology, zoology
- Workplaces: National Museum of Natural History, France

Ping-Wen Fang (Chinese: 方炳文; 1903 – 26 August 1944) was a Chinese ichthyologist and zoologist. He was a pioneer in the study of Chinese fishes, particularly in the fields of fish morphology, anatomy and systematic taxonomy.

Fang worked as a technician in the zoology department of the Natural History Museum of the National Central Research Institute in China, where he conducted zoological research. In 1938, he accepted an invitation from the National Museum of Natural History in Paris, France, to conduct research on fishes.

He was killed during an Allied bombing of Paris on the evening of 26 August 1944.

== Taxonomic contributions ==
Fang described or named several new genera and species of animals, particularly freshwater fishes. His zoological author abbreviation is Fang.

The following list includes taxa attributed to Fang, with English translations of their Chinese names. Where an established English common name is unavailable, a literal translation is provided for identification.

=== Fishes ===
- Sinogastromyzon (Chinese mountain-stream suckers), 1930
  - Sinogastromyzon wui – Wu's Chinese sucker (刺臀华吸鳅), 1930
  - Sinogastromyzon szechuanensis – Sichuan Chinese sucker (四川华吸鳅), 1930
  - Sinogastromyzon hsiashiensis – Hsiashi Chinese sucker (下司华吸鳅), 1931
  - Hemimyzon – Yantan stream loach (窑滩间吸鳅), 1935
- Short-bodied loach gudgeon (短身鳅鮀), 1931
- Liniparhomaloptera – Chinese false stream loaches, 1935
- Yellow River plateau loach (黄河高原鳅), 1935
- Small-bladder plateau loach (小鳔高原鳅), 1935
- Pingzhou sucker-belly loach (平舟原缨口鳅), 1935
- Sinocyclocheilus – Golden-line barbel genus (金线鲃属), 1936
  - Sinocyclocheilus tingi – Fuxian golden-line barbel (抚仙金线鲃)
- Fine-scaled schizothoracin (细鳞裂腹鱼), 1936
- Hu gudgeon (胡鮈), 1938
- Huo's madtom (霍氏疯鲿), 1940
- Lun's false catfish (伦氏拟鲿), 1940
- An's plateau loach (安氏高原鳅), 1941
- Zhang's gizzard shad (张氏鲚), 1942

=== Amphibians ===
- Tylototriton kweichowensis – Guizhou crocodile newt (贵州疣螈), 1932.

The Fuxian golden-line barbel and the Guizhou crocodile newt were included in China's 2021 List of National Key Protected Wild Animals as Class II protected species.
