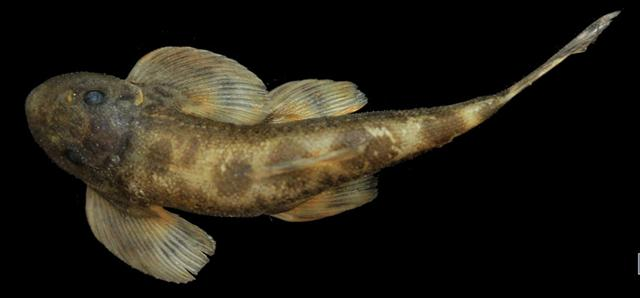
- Hemimyzon nanensis

Scientific classification
- Kingdom: Animalia
- Phylum: Chordata
- Class: Actinopterygii
- Order: Cypriniformes
- Family: Balitoridae
- Genus: Hemimyzon; Regan, 1911

Type species
- Homaloptera formosana Boulenger, 1894

Species
- see text

= Hemimyzon =

Genus of fishes

Hemimyzon is a genus of freshwater ray-finned fish belonging to the family Balitoridae, the river or hillstream loaches. The species in this genus are found in eastern Asia.

== Species ==
Hemimyzon contains the following species:

- Hemimyzon confluens Kottelat, 2000
- Hemimyzon ecdyonuroides Freyhof & Herder, 2002
- Hemimyzon formosanus (Boulenger, 1894)
- Hemimyzon indicus Lalramliana, Solo, Lalronunga & Lalnuntluanga, 2018
- Hemimyzon khonensis Kottelat, 2000
- Hemimyzon macropterus C.-Y. Zheng, 1982
- Hemimyzon megalopseos Z.-Y. Li & Y.-R. Chen, 1985
- Hemimyzon nanensis Doi & Kottelat, 1998
- Hemimyzon nujiangensis (C.-Y. Zhang & W. Zheng, 1983)
- Hemimyzon papilio Kottelat, 1998
- Hemimyzon pengi (S. Huang, 1982)
- Hemimyzon pumilicorpora C.-Y. Zheng & W. Zhang, 1987
- Hemimyzon sheni I.-S. Chen & L.-S. Fang, 2009
- Hemimyzon taitungensis C.-S. Tzeng & S.C. Shen, 1982
- Hemimyzon yaotanensis (P. W. Fang, 1931)
- Hemimyzon yushanensis I.-S. Chen, Harefa, Y.-C. Chang & C.-C. Han, 2022
