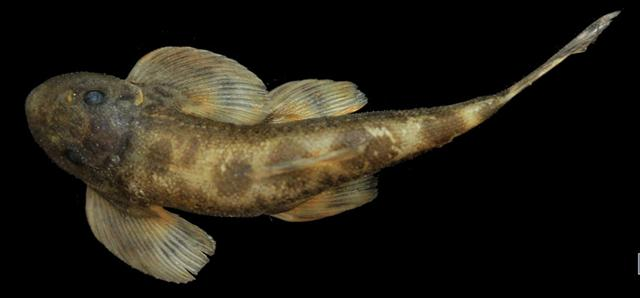
- Hemimyzon nanensis

Scientific classification
- Kingdom: Animalia
- Phylum: Chordata
- Class: Actinopterygii
- Order: Cypriniformes
- Suborder: Cobitoidei
- Family: Balitoridae; Swainson, 1839

Genera
- see text

= Balitoridae =

Family of fishes

Balitoridae, the hillstream loaches or river loaches, is a family, of small fish from South, Southeast and East Asia. The family includes about 202 species. They are sometimes sold as "lizardfish" or (in Germany) "flossensaugers". Many of the species are popular for aquaria; species in the genus Sewellia are most commonly sold in the aquaria trade. They have a number of similarities with the Cobitidae, their sibling family of "loaches", such as multiple barbels around the mouth. They should not be confused with the loricariids, which look similar but are a family of catfish.

Most species are rheophilic, living in swift, clear and well-oxygenated streams. Several species of the family live in fast-flowing streams or torrents and have modified ventral fins used for clinging to rocks.

The subfamily Nemacheilinae has recently been separated as a distinct family, Nemacheilidae (stone loaches) and several genera have been separated into the family Gastromyzontidae.

== Genera ==
Balitoridae contains the following genera:

- Balitora Gray, 1830
- Balitoropsis H. M. Smith, 1945
- Bhavania Hora, 1920
- Cryptotora Kottelat, 1998
- Ghatsa Z. S. Randall & Page, 2015
- Hemimyzon Regan, 1911
- Homaloptera van Hasselt, 1823
- Homalopteroides Fowler, 1905
- Homalopterula Fowler, 1940
- Jinshaia Kottelat & Chu, 1988
- Lepturichthys Regan, 1911
- Metahomaloptera H.-W. Chang, 1944
- Neohomaloptera Herre, 1944
- Pseudohomaloptera Silas, 1953
- Sinogastromyzon P.-W. Fang, 1930
- Travancoria Hora, 1941
