= Oriental Basin =

Valley in Mexico

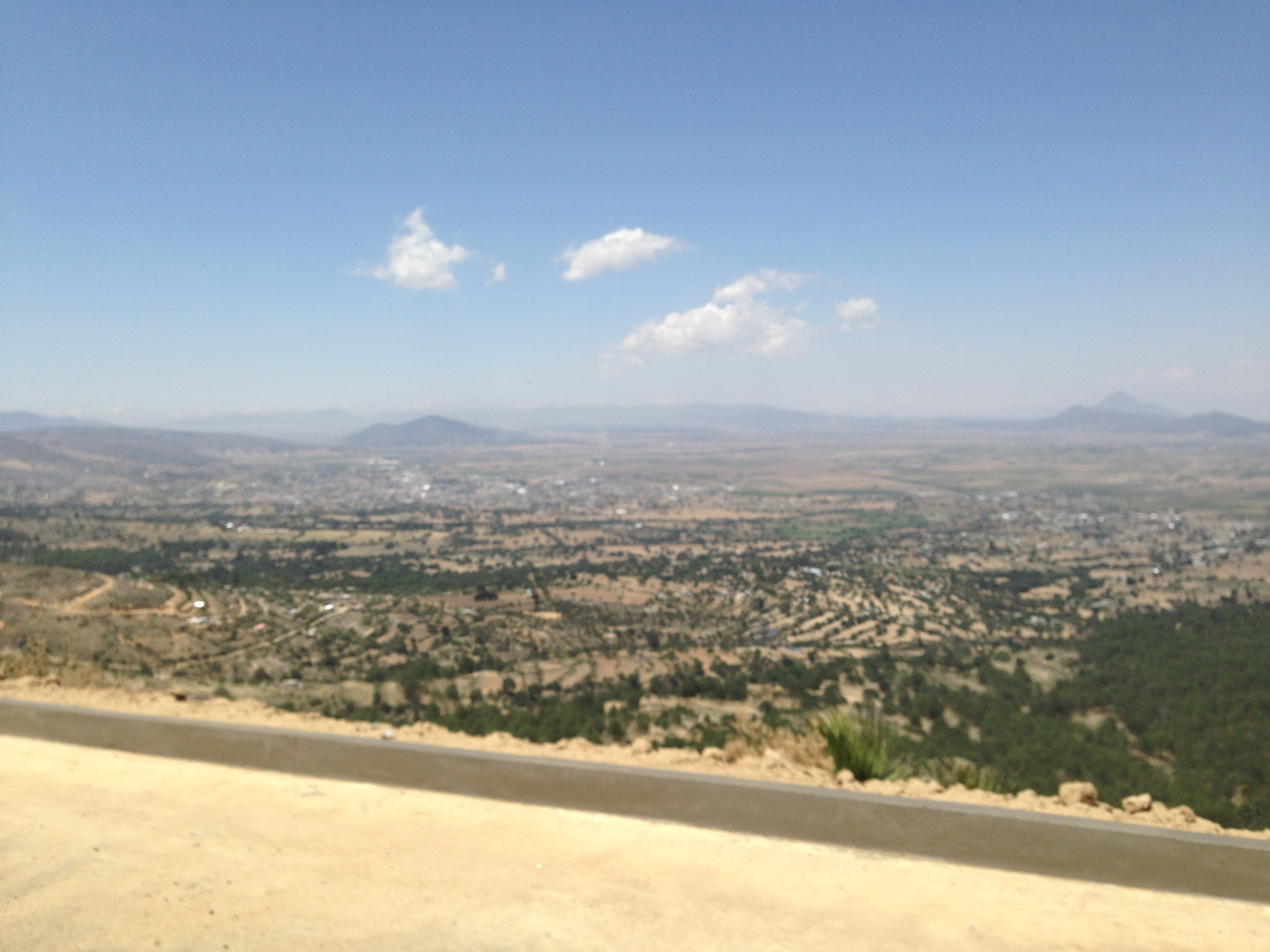
- Valley of Libres

- Location within Mexico
- Floor elevation: 2,360 m (7,740 ft)

Geography
- Location: Mexico
- Coordinates: 19°25′00″N 97°24′00″W
- Rivers: Río Salado
- Interactive map of Oriental Basin

The Oriental Basin, also known as the Libres-Oriental Basin, Oriental-Serdán Basin or San Juan Plains (in Spanish, Llanos de San Juan or Cuenca de Libres-Oriental), is an endorheic basin in east-central Mexico. It covers an area of 4,958.60 square kilometers, lying in the states of Puebla, Tlaxcala, and Veracruz.

The climate is temperate and subtropical, semi-arid to subhumid, with summer rains. Average annual temperature 12-16 °C, and annual total precipitation is 400–800 mm. The Trans-Mexican Volcanic Belt pine-oak forests ecoregion covers the mountains surrounding the basin to the west, north, and east. The mountains to the north and west, including the Cofre de Perote volcano, leave the valley in a rain shadow, and the xeric shrublands of the Tehuacán Valley matorral ecoregion occupies the center of the basin, and extend south into the Tehuacán and Cuicatlán valleys. Vegetation includes pine-oak forests and pine-fir forests at higher elevations, with dry scrub pine forests, oak forests, juniper scrub, yucca scrub, halophytic vegetation, and grassland. It includes the Llanos de San Juan and Llanos de San Andres.

The basin contains several shallow, mostly alkaline lakes. Two ephemeral playa lakes, Totolcinco (El Carmen or Totolcingo) and Tepeyahualco (El Salado), lie in the lowest part of the basin (2300 meters elevation), and remain dry for most of the year. The basin includes six maar lakes, locally called axalpazcos, lying in shallow volcanic craters and sustained by underground water. A northern group of lakes – Alchichica, Quechulac, Atexcac, and La Preciosa – lie southeast of Lake Tepeyahualco, and the southern lakes, Aljojuca and San Miguel Tecuitlapa, lie southeast of Lake Totolcinco. The basin also has five dry maars, called xalapazcos.

Chief towns in the basin include El Carmen Tequexquitla, Tlaxcala; Perote, Veracruz; and Oriental, Puebla.

Groundwater levels in the basin have been dropping in recent years because of over-exploitation for irrigation and destruction of natural recharging areas. In addition, the government is considering pumping freshwater from the Oriental basin to Mexico City to the west and Puebla to the south.

== Maar lakes ==
The maar lakes, or axalpazcos, of the Oriental Basin are home to a closely knit set of endemic species, one at each crater lake. Some of these include the Atherinopsid fishes Alchichica silverside (Poblana alchichica), La Preciosa silverside (P. letholepis), Chignahuapan silverside (P. ferdebueni), and Quechulac silverside (P. squamata). Three species of dace (Evarra bustamantei, E. eigenmanni, and E. tlahuacensis) formerly native to the basin are presumed extinct since about 1970.

The WWF-Nature Conservancy system of freshwater ecoregions includes the Oriental Basin with the Valley of Mexico, Lerma River, and Lake Chapala in their Lerma-Chapala freshwater ecoregion, based on faunal similarities, especially among the Atherinopsids.

lake	surface area (square kilometers)	volume (millions of cubic meters)	maximum depth (meters)
Alchichica	1.81	69.9	64.6
La Preciosa	0.78	16.2	45.5
Quechulac	0.50	10.9	40.0
Aljojuca	0.44	11.6	50.6
Atexcac	0.29	6.1	39.1
Tecuitlapa	0.26	0.35	2.5

=== Lake Alchichica ===
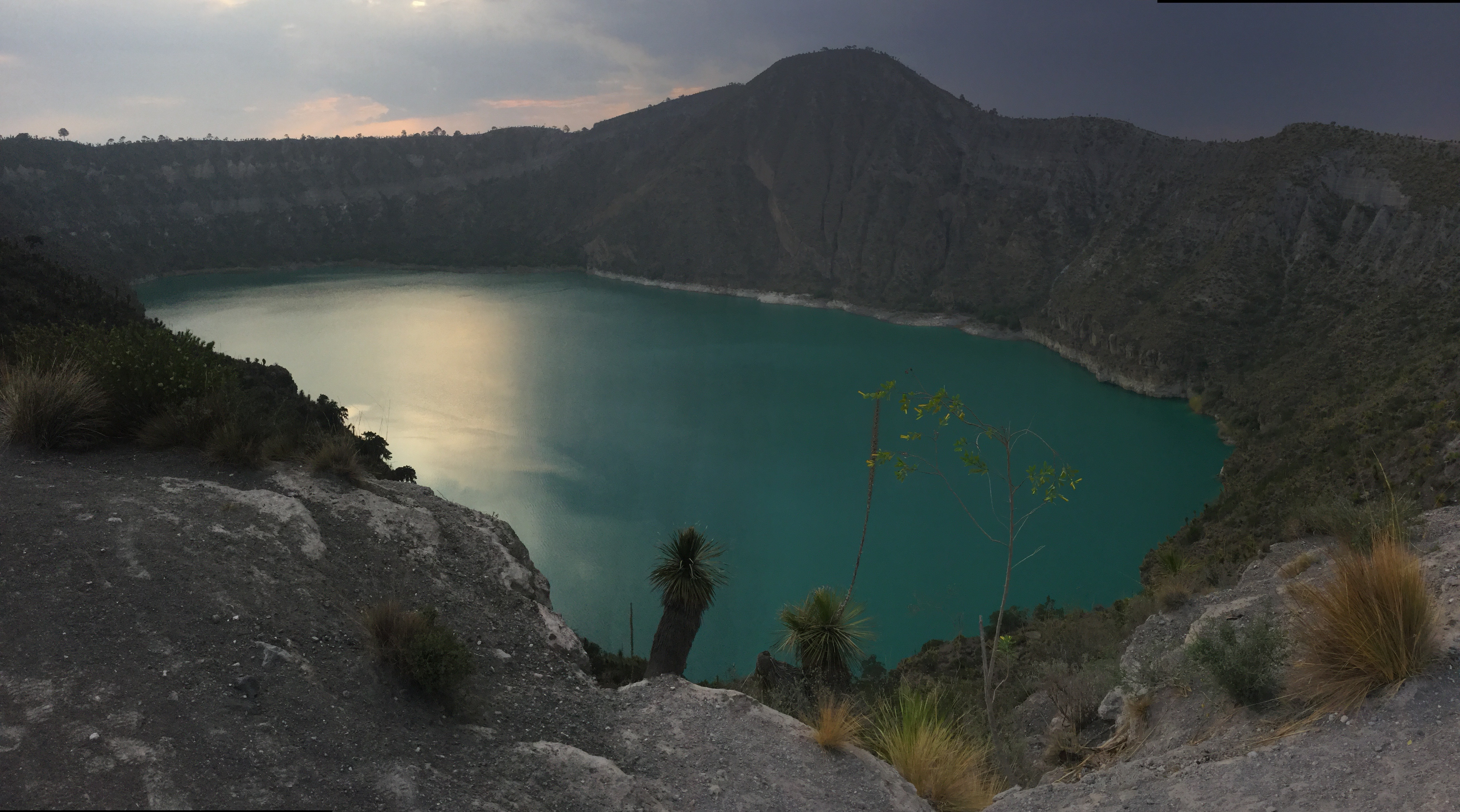
Atexcac Lake

Lake Alchichica (19°25′N 97°24′W) in Tepeyahualco (municipality), Puebla, is the largest of the maar lakes of the Oriental Basin, and lies at an elevation of 2320 meters. It is Mexico's deepest natural lake, with a maximum depth of 64 meters, and a mean depth of 38.6 meters. The lake has an area of 1.81 square kilometers. It is both saline and alkaline (pH 8.7-9.2).

Lake Alchichica is ecologically unique, with stromatolite deposits and a high degree of endemism. The biota has adapted to extreme conditions characterized by high ionic concentrations of water and poor nutrient content. The dominant stromatolite species are the spongy type Enthophysalis atrata, Enthophysalis sp. Calothrix cf. Parletina and Calothrix sp. and the columnar stromatolites Enthophysalis lithophyla and Nitzschia sp. In the deep parts of the lake, abundant cladophores develop on the spongy stromatolites, with many cyanobacterial epiphytes Chamaesiphon halophilus, Heteroleibleinia profunda, Mantellum rubrum and Xenococcus candelariae. 23 genera of phytoplankton have been found: fourteen genera of Chrysophyta, five of Cyanophyta and four of Chlorophyta.

The dominant species throughout the year are Agmenellum sp., Amphora sp., Chaetoceros similis, Coscinodiscus sp., Cyclotella striata, Nodularia spumigena, Stephanodiscus niagarae and Synechocystis sp. The best represented species best of vascular plants in the axalpazcos are rooted emergent hydrophytes Eleocharis montevidensis, Juncus andicola, J. balticus subsp. mexicanus (syn. J. mexicanus), Phragmites australis, Scirpus californicus and Typha domingensis, the submerged rooted hydrophytes Cyperus laevigatus, Potamogeton pectinatus and Ruppia maritima, and the free-floating hydrophyte Lemna gibba.

Animals endemic to Lake Alchichica include the Taylor's Salamander (Ambystoma taylori), the fish Poblana alchichica (Alchichica silverside, Charal de Alchichica), and the isopod Caecidotea williamsi.
