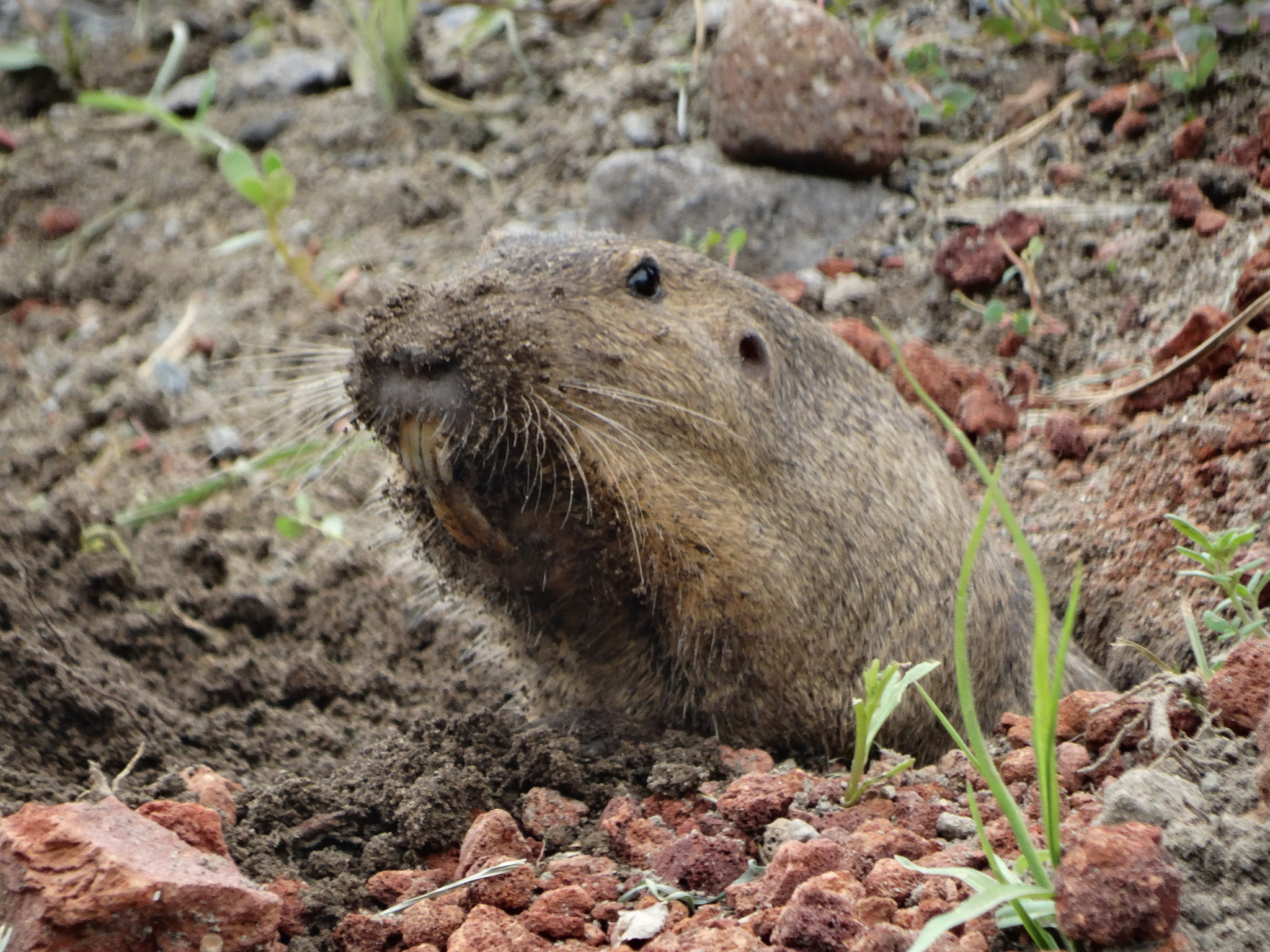

Conservation status
- Least Concern (IUCN 3.1)

Scientific classification
- Kingdom: Animalia
- Phylum: Chordata
- Class: Mammalia
- Order: Rodentia
- Family: Geomyidae
- Genus: Cratogeomys
- Species: C. fulvescens

Binomial name
- Cratogeomys fulvescens Merriam, 1895
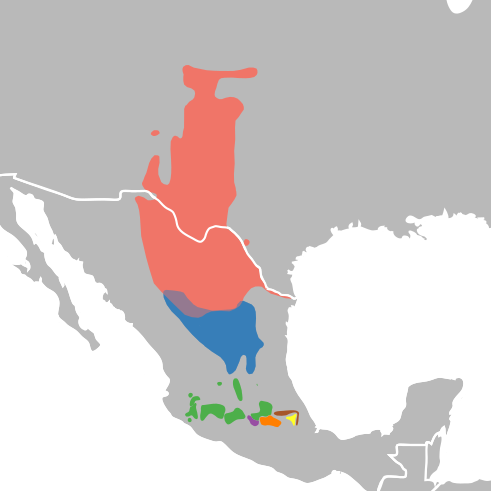
- Cratogeomys distribution C. fulvescens in yellow

Synonyms
- Pappogeomys (Cratogeomys) merriami fulvescens (Merriam, 1895); Cratogeomys fulvescens subluteus Nelson and Goldman, 1934; Cratogeomys merriami fulvescens Merriam, 1895

= Oriental Basin pocket gopher =

Species of rodent

The Oriental Basin pocket gopher (Cratogeomys fulvescens) is a species of pocket gopher which is endemic to Mexico. It was first described in 1895 by Clinton Hart Merriam. It was considered to be a subspecies of Merriam's pocket gopher (Cratogeomys merriami) in the late 20th and early 21st century but has been reinstated as its own species. The IUCN Red List has evaluated it to be of least concern.

== Description ==
C. fulvescens is mid-sized for the genus Cratogeomys and exhibits sexual dimorphism in size. Adult males weigh 250–550 g (8.8–19.4 oz) and adult females weigh 250–350 g (8.8–12.3 oz). Its fur coloration is "grizzled yellowish-brown" with "a strong mixture of black-tipped hairs"; the underside is paler than the dorsal fur. The cranial width of its skull is typically less than 26 mm (1.0 in), making it small for the genus. The dental formula is 1.0.1.31.0.1.3 × 2 = 20. Each upper incisor has a longitudinal groove along its anterior surface. The total body length is 290–350 mm (11–14 in).

== Distribution ==
This species is endemic to a small region in the southern half of Mexico. Its range is in the Oriental Basin of the Trans-Mexican Volcanic Belt, and is within the Mexican states of Puebla, Tlaxcala, and Veracruz. The elevation in its distribution spans 2,300–2,700 m (7,500–8,900 ft). Merriam noted the type locality as: "Chalchicomula, State of Puebla, Mexico"; this city is now known as Ciudad Serdán. The type locality for the formerly-recognized subspecies C. f. subluteus is Perote, Veracruz.

== Taxonomic history ==
The American zoologist Clinton Hart Merriam wrote the species description for C. fulvescens in 1895. Merriam based his description on eleven specimens from Puebla and Veracruz, Mexico. In Merriam's classification of Cratogeomys, C. fulvescens was grouped with C. castanops on the basis of cranial morphology.

In 1968, Robert J. Russell reclassified Cratogeomys to be a subgenus of Pappogeomys. Russell also analyzed Merriam's C. fulvescens as being a subspecies of what was in his work called Pappogeomys (Cratogeomys) merriami. Russell stated that of the seven subspecies he recognized for P. (C.) merriami, "the most divergent" was P. (C.) m. fulvescens due to differences in coloration, size, and cranial morphology. This classification in E. Raymond Hall's 1981 The Mammals of North America also used the combination P. (C.) m. fulvescens for this taxon. Cratogeomys was reinstated as a genus in 1982; the third edition of Mammal Species of the World refers to this taxon as C. m. fulvescens.

C. fulvescens was reinstated as its own species in 2005 due to a genetic and morphological study by Mark S. Hafner and colleagues. They placed it in the C. castanops species group.

No subspecies are presently recognized. A subspecies, C. f. subluteus had been described in 1934 by Edward William Nelson and Edward Alphonso Goldman. This subspecies was also known by the common names "yellow pocket gopher" and "fulvous pocket gopher".

The holotypes for C. fulvescens and for C. f. subluteus are both in the collections of the U.S. National Museum of Natural History, Washington, DC. Each specimen consists of its preserved skin and its skull. Nelson and Goldman collected both holotypes: The C. fulvescens holotype was collected in 1894, and the C. f. subluteus holotype was collected in 1893.

The specific epithet fulvescens (fulv-esc-ens, "yellowing") is the Latin present participle of the inchoative form of the verb meaning "to become tawny". The epithet of its formerly recognized subspecies, subluteus (sub-luteus), is a Latin adjective meaning "yellowish". The common name for the species, Oriental Basin pocket gopher, refers to the Oriental Basin in Mexico, where it is found. Its common name in Spanish is gran tuza de la Cuenca de Oriental.

== Biology ==
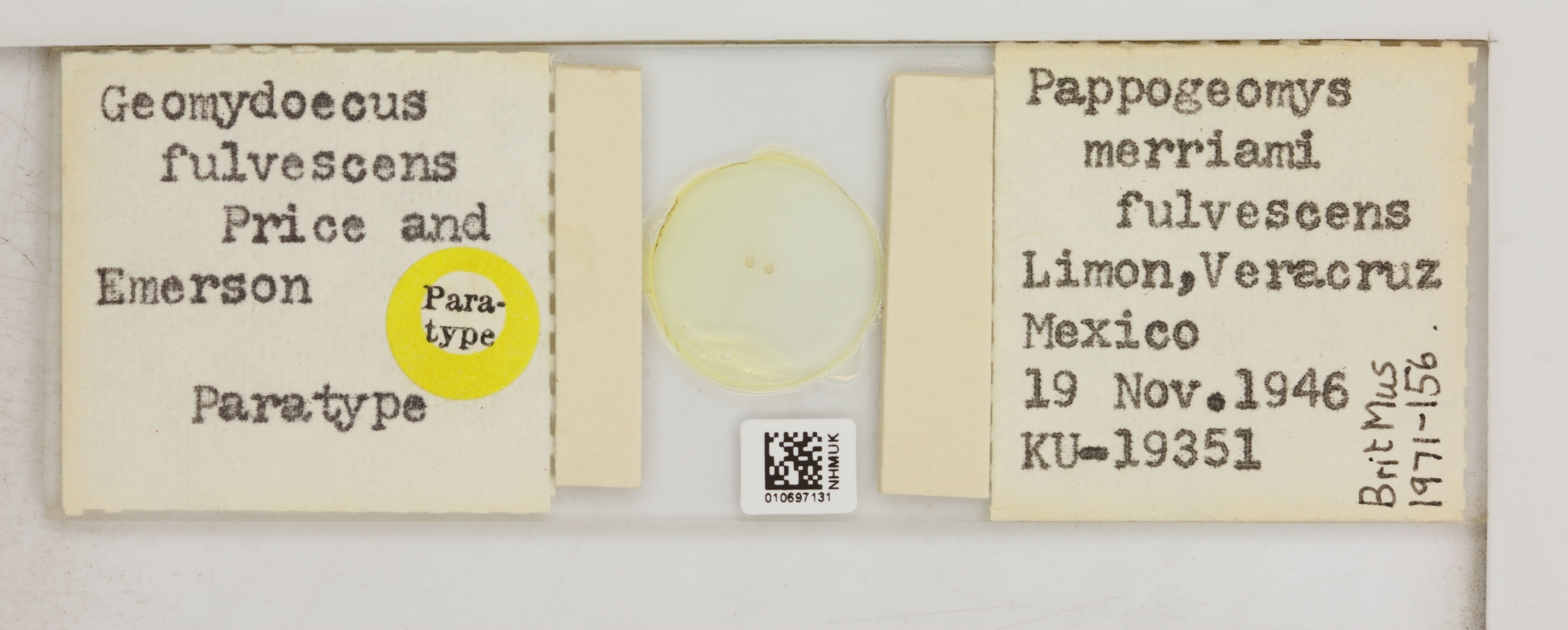
G. fulvescens paratypes in the Natural History Museum, London

C. fulvescens's diet consists of rhizomes, bulbs, and roots. Pregnancy has been observed from December through February. Because pregnancy was not observed in July, it is thought they only have one litter each year.

Two species of chewing lice in the genus Geomydoecus have C. fulvescens as a host: G. fulvescens and G. veracruzensis. Both species were described in 1971 by Roger D. Price and K. C. Emerson. The flea species Dasypsyllus megasoma and Meringis altipecten were also observed on C. fulvescens; although it is thought the presence of M. altipecten is thought to have been accidental rather than due to being a typical ectoparasite for the species. The nematode species Vexillata convoluta is also a parasite of C. fulvescens.

== Genetics ==
Its diploid number is 2n=40 and its fundamental number is FN=72. C. fulvescens contains an autapomorphic allele for the gene RAG1 distinguishing it from C. perotensis and C. merriami.

== Conservation status and relationship with humans ==
The IUCN Red List has classified this species as a least-concern species, and SEMARNAT did not include it in its 2010 list of threatened or endangered mammals of Mexico. Although its observed habitat is less than 20,000 km^{2} (7,700 sq mi), it is believed to be "common and adaptable". Part of its range is affected by habitat loss due to human expansion. C. fulvescens were found as roadkill along a highway going through its range. Mark S. Hafner wrote there ought to be further studies on its conservation status, particularly as its geographic range is smaller than that of other Mexican pocket gophers. C. fulvescens have been observed in farmland and might be considered to be a pest as they destroy crops including wheat, corn, and beans.
