= Geomyphilus coronadoi =

Scientific classification
- Kingdom: Animalia
- Phylum: Arthropoda
- Clade: Pancrustacea
- Class: Insecta
- Order: Coleoptera
- Suborder: Polyphaga
- Infraorder: Scarabaeiformia
- Family: Scarabaeidae
- Genus: Geomyphilus
- Species: G. coronadoi

Binomial name
- Geomyphilus coronadoi (Islas, 1955)

Synonyms
- Aphodius (Platyderides) coronadoi Islas, 1955

Species of beetle

Geomyphilus coronadoi is a species of beetle of the family Scarabaeidae. It is found in Mexico (México, Morelos).

== Description ==
Adults reach a length of about 5–5.5 mm (0.20–0.22 in). They have an oblong, moderately convex, shiny, glabrous, rufo-piceous body. Part of the head, margins of the elytra and legs are reddish, while the antennal club is brownish.

== Life history ==
Specimens have been collected in the nests of Cratogeomys merriami.
