= Geomyphilus barrerai =

Scientific classification
- Kingdom: Animalia
- Phylum: Arthropoda
- Clade: Pancrustacea
- Class: Insecta
- Order: Coleoptera
- Suborder: Polyphaga
- Infraorder: Scarabaeiformia
- Family: Scarabaeidae
- Genus: Geomyphilus
- Species: G. barrerai

Binomial name
- Geomyphilus barrerai (Islas, 1955)

Synonyms
- Aphodius (Platyderides) barrerai Islas, 1955

Species of beetle

Geomyphilus barrerai is a species of beetle of the family Scarabaeidae. It is found in Mexico (México, Tlaxcala, Veracruz).

== Description ==
Adults reach a length of about 5–6 mm (0.20–0.24 in). They have a moderately elongate, moderately convex, weakly shiny, nearly glabrous, reddish-brown body. The margin of the clypeus and sides of the pronotum are paler and the legs are reddish-brown. The antennal club is dark brown.

== Life history ==
Specimens have been collected in the nests of Cratogeomys merriami and Orthogeomys.
