= Marsh organ =

Device used in coastal ocean science

The marsh organ is a collection of plastic pipes attached to a wooden framework that is placed in marshes to measure the effects of inundation time and flood frequency on the productivity of marsh vegetation. The information is used for scientific research purposes.

The marsh organ was developed by James Morris from the University of South Carolina with support from the National Science Foundation and NOAA's National Centers for Coastal Ocean Science. Their objective was to quantify short-term and long-term effects of sea level rise on coastal processes such as plant productivity, decomposition of organic matter in soil, sedimentation that contribute to the structuring of wetland stability.

== Climate change ==
The marsh organ is used to determine how well various coastal processes will respond to sea level rise. Climate change impacts such as accelerated sea level rise causes coastal marshes to experience higher water levels than normal, which leads to higher salinity inland, sediment and elevation loss, and change to the plant community structure.

These consequences will affect stress-gradients that are imposed on coastal vegetation, but the tolerances of these plant species and the trade-offs they may experience are unclear. This device is a way to directly manipulate what marsh vegetation may experience in the future and provide better insight into the restoration efforts needed to prevent detrimental consequences to coastal marshes.

== Design ==
The marsh organ is a structure with rows of pipes at different vertical elevations. These pipes are filled with mud and marsh plant species are planted into each pipe. The various vertical levels represent varying water-level "elevation" that the marsh plants would experience. As the tides ebb and flow, the pipes are exposed to rising and falling water levels. Scientists can adjust various factors, such as the total elevation of the setup, flooding duration, added nutrients and much more.

Over time, scientists can gather information such as total plant biomass accumulation, total organic matter, peat formation, decomposition rates, and sedimentation. The data can be used to forecast the future health of the marsh being studied, and to infer how the marsh will respond to sea level rise in the future.

== Species-specific effects ==
With many different marsh organ study designs and approaches, researchers have found that marsh plants may respond to future sea level rise differently, therefore it is entirely species-specific.

Researchers studying marsh plant responses in Northeast Pacific tidal marshes utilized a marsh organ and found that species typically found in the high marsh (flooded only during high tide or extreme weather events) like Salicornia pacifica and Juncus balticus were sensitive to increased flooding. Other species such as Bolboschoenus maritimus and Carex lyngbyei were abundant in marshes at or above the elevation corresponding with their maximum productivity. Another group using the marsh organ also found that increased inundation reduced biomass for species commonly found at higher marsh elevations. The presence of neighbors reduced total biomass even more.

A group of researchers used a marsh organ to evaluate the effects of an invasive grass to the native plant communities of an estuary in China. They found that the invasive grass survived well in optimal elevations, and not very well in extreme high and low elevations. When mixed with native species, the invasive grass suppressed the native biomass by 90% at intermediate elevation where biomass was typically the greatest. Another group who used the marsh organ in the Pacific Northwest of North America to study its role in field testing seed recruitment niches found that species common to the area like S. tabernaemontani exhibited nearly significant higher germination rates around the average tidal height, while the species Carex lyngbyei survived significantly better around the highest tidal height. Both species also showed sensitivity to competitors, with S. tabernaemontani being the only species to germinate in the presence of competition.

== External stressors ==
Along with the stress of rising sea levels, marsh vegetation is also influenced by many outside sources such as storms, drought, nutrient enrichment, and elevation change with subsidence. The responses of marsh plants to these stressors have been tracked in various studies using the marsh organ.

A group using the marsh organ to study Spartina alterniflora, an abundant low marsh (typically flooded throughout the day) grass found that storm and drought stressors led to significantly less above-ground biomass and below-ground biomass than those planted in ambient rain conditions. Plants flooded at high inundations additionally had finer roots and shoots resulting in a plant that is structurally weaker.

Nutrient addition has the potential to aid in the growth of many plant species, but excess nutrients can have the reverse effect and be detrimental to the success of many marsh plants. In one marsh organ study, researchers found a positive relationship where added nitrogen enhanced plant growth at sea levels where plants are most stressed by flooding, and the effects were larger in combination with elevated carbon dioxide. However, they noted that chronic nitrogen addition from pollution reduces the availability of propagules (a bud of a new plant) of flood-tolerant species which would shift species dominance making marshes more susceptible to collapse. This trade-off has also been found in marsh organ studies where nutrient addition has to potential to increase primary productivity, but can adversely impact organic matter accumulation and peat formation.

Marsh plants can be sensitive to elevation change accompanying sea level rise due to the altering of their desired habitats. Using the marsh organ setup, researchers discovered that for marsh elevations higher than optimum expected at low sea level rise rates, acceleration in the rate of sea level rise will enhance root growth, organic accretion and wetland stability altogether. But, for sub-optimum marsh elevations expected at rapid sea level rise rates with low sediment supply, increases in water level will lead to reduced root growth and a decrease in the rate of elevation gain. This could lead to a rapidly deteriorating marsh. Coinciding with elevation, a group of researchers utilizing the marsh organ found that soil subsided less in planted treatments than unplanted control treatments suggested that plants potentially help alleviate the loss of marsh elevation due to sea level rise

Researchers have also found that water level variability in a specified time period affects the growth of coastal marshes, with emphasis on anomalies in sea level. These consist of slow changes that do not affect sediment transport, but do affect marsh flooding and vegetation growth.
