= Coelotrachelus kuntzeni =

Scientific classification
- Kingdom: Animalia
- Phylum: Arthropoda
- Clade: Pancrustacea
- Class: Insecta
- Order: Coleoptera
- Suborder: Polyphaga
- Infraorder: Scarabaeiformia
- Family: Scarabaeidae
- Genus: Coelotrachelus
- Species: C. kuntzeni

Binomial name
- Coelotrachelus kuntzeni (Schmidt, 1914)

Synonyms
- Aphodius (Coelotrachelus) kuntzeni Schmidt, 1914; Aphodius (Coelotrachelus) michiliensis Deloya, 1991; Aphodius amplinotum Gordon & Howden, 1972

Species of beetle

Coelotrachelus kuntzeni is a species of beetle of the family Scarabaeidae. It is found in Mexico (Durango).

== Description ==
Adults reach a length of about 7–8 mm (0.28–0.31 in). They have an elongate, shiny, moderately convex, glabrous, piceous-black body, with the head and pronotum shadowy piceous-reddish. The antennae are brown-reddish with a blackish club and the legs are piceous.

== Life history ==
Specimens have been collected in the tunnels of Thomomys species, in dung in the nests of Thomomys umbrinus, as well as in the nest of Cratogeomys merriami.
