= Poblana =

Scientific classification
- Kingdom: Animalia
- Phylum: Chordata
- Class: Actinopterygii
- Order: Atheriniformes
- Family: Atherinopsidae
- Subfamily: Menidiinae
- Tribe: Mendiniini
- Genus: Poblana; F. de Buen, 1945

Type species
- Poblana alchichica F. de Buen, 1945

Genus of fishes

Poblana is a genus of Neotropical silversides that are endemic to Mexico, with each of the four threatened species restricted to a single Oriental Basin maar lake. They are small fish that do not surpass 8 cm (3 in) in standard length.

== Species ==
FishBase recognizes four species in this genus, although genetic differences between them are very limited and some regard all as subspecies of P. alchichica. Poblana is sometimes included in Chirostoma instead of being regarded a separate genus.

- Poblana alchichica F. de Buen, 1945 (Alchichica silverside)
- Poblana ferdebueni Solórzano & Y. López, 1965 (Chignahuapan silverside)
- Poblana letholepis Álvarez, 1950 (La Preciosa silverside)
- Poblana squamata Álvarez, 1950 (Quechulac silverside)
