= Lago Colina Dam =

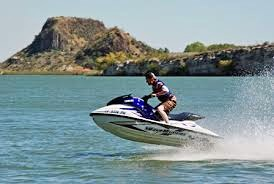

- Location within Mexico
- Location: San Francisco de Conchos Municipality, Chihuahua
- Coordinates: 27°34′34″N 105°22′56″W
- Purpose: Irrigation, competition and recreational fishing of black bass, catfish, bluegill, crab

Dam and spillways
- Type of dam: Gravity
- Impounds: Rio Conchos

Reservoir
- Creates: Lake Colina

Lago Colina Dam (Spanish: Presa Lago Colina) is a concrete and earth-embankment gravity dam on the Rio Conchos in Chihuahua, Mexico. The dam forms Lake Colina. Its primary purpose is to divert water for irrigation, and regulate the outflow of the larger La Boquilla Dam upstream.

== See also ==
- List of dams and reservoirs § Mexico
- List of lakes in Mexico
