= La Boquilla Dam =

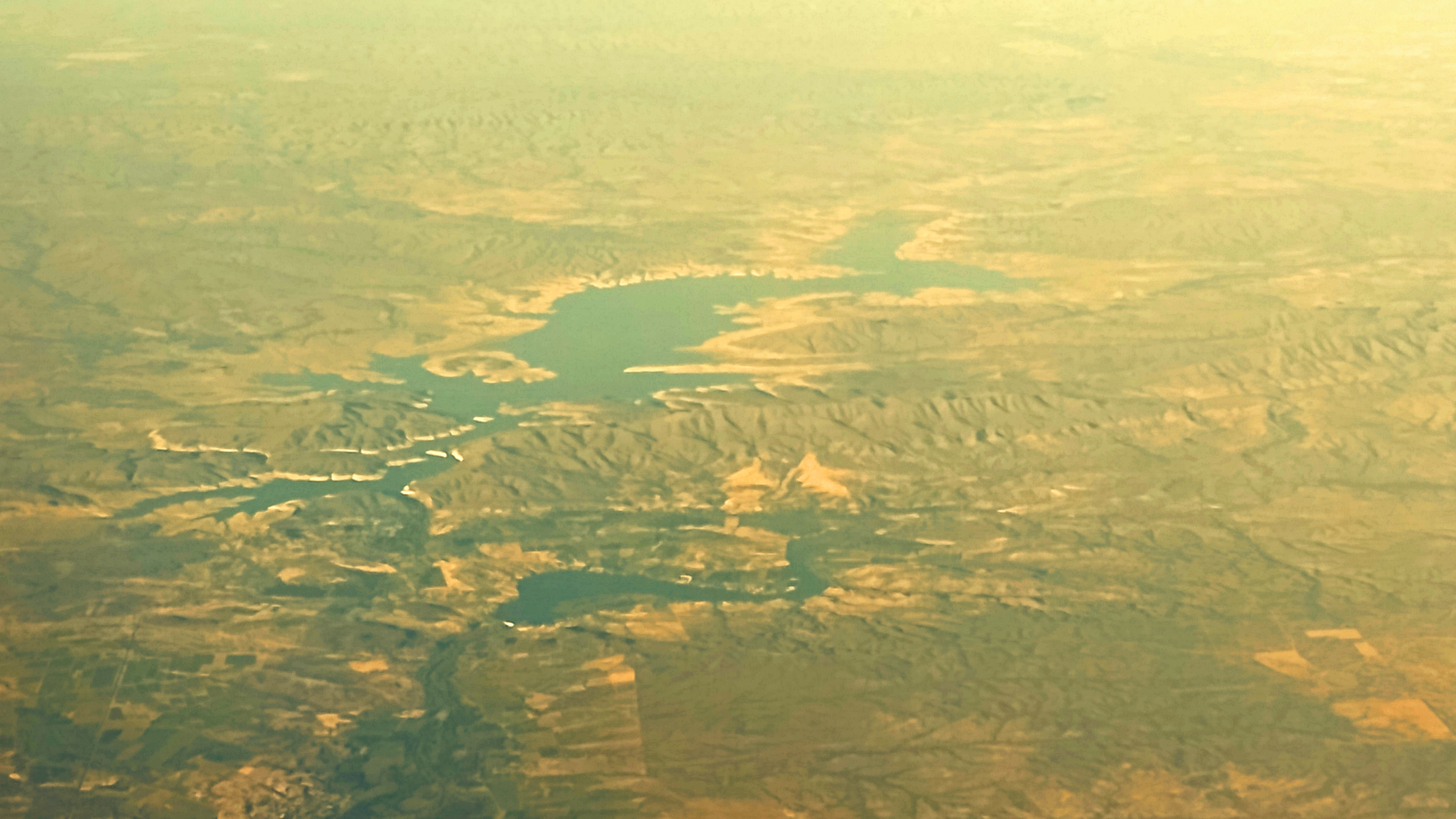

- Location within Mexico Location within Chihuahua
- Official name: Presa de la Boquilla
- Location: San Francisco de Conchos Municipality, Chihuahua
- Coordinates: 27°32′41″N 105°24′51″W
- Construction began: 1910
- Opening date: 1915
- Owner: Comisión Federal de Electricidad

Dam and spillways
- Type of dam: Gravity
- Impounds: Rio Conchos
- Height (foundation): 80 m (260 ft)

Reservoir
- Creates: Toronto Lake
- Total capacity: 2.903 km^{3} (2,354,000 acre⋅ft)

Power Station
- Installed capacity: 25 MW
- Annual generation: 164.6 GWh

La Boquilla Dam (Spanish: Presa de la Boquilla) is a masonry arch-gravity dam on the Rio Conchos in Chihuahua, Mexico. It was built in 1910 to provide hydroelectricity, irrigation and flood control, and forms Toronto Lake with a capacity of 2.903 cubic kilometres (2,354,000 acre⋅ft). The dam and the nearby town of Boquilla de Conchos are named for the abrupt narrowing of the Conchos valley where the dam was built: boquilla means "nozzle" or "mouth".

Construction began in 1910 and was completed in 1915. The dam has overflowed several times throughout its history, most notably in 1917 and 2008, causing severe flooding downstream.

The power plant at the dam has a generating capacity of 25 megawatts. In 2004 it produced 164,660,000 kilowatt hours of energy.

One demonstrator was killed and another injured in September 2020 during a protest by farmers against sending water from La Boquilla Dam to the United States as stipulated in a Treaty relating to the utilization of waters of the Colorado and Tijuana Rivers and of the Rio Grande signed in 1944. Locals blamed the Mexican National Guard, who responded they did not do it and that the event needed to be investigated.

The National Guard later withdrew from the site.

== See also ==
- Lago Colina Dam
- List of dams and reservoirs § Mexico
- List of lakes in Mexico
