= Geomyphilus pierai =

Scientific classification
- Kingdom: Animalia
- Phylum: Arthropoda
- Clade: Pancrustacea
- Class: Insecta
- Order: Coleoptera
- Suborder: Polyphaga
- Infraorder: Scarabaeiformia
- Family: Scarabaeidae
- Genus: Geomyphilus
- Species: G. pierai

Binomial name
- Geomyphilus pierai (Lobo & Deloya, 1996)

Synonyms
- Aphodius (Platyderides) pierai Lobo & Deloya, 1996

Species of beetle

Geomyphilus pierai is a species of beetle of the family Scarabaeidae. It is found in Mexico (Tlaxcala, Veracruz).

== Description ==
Adults reach a length of about 5–5.5 mm (0.20–0.22 in). They have an elongate-oval, moderately convex, shiny, glabrous, piceous body. The margin of the clypeus, sides of the pronotum and the elytra are reddish-brown, while the legs are brownish and the antennal club is blackish.

== Life history ==
Specimens have been collected in the nests of Cratogeomys merriami.
