= Coelotrachelus ixtapalapaensis =

Scientific classification
- Kingdom: Animalia
- Phylum: Arthropoda
- Clade: Pancrustacea
- Class: Insecta
- Order: Coleoptera
- Suborder: Polyphaga
- Infraorder: Scarabaeiformia
- Family: Scarabaeidae
- Genus: Coelotrachelus
- Species: C. ixtapalapaensis

Binomial name
- Coelotrachelus ixtapalapaensis Dellacasa, Dellacasa & Gordon, 2009

Species of beetle

Coelotrachelus ixtapalapaensis is a species of beetle of the family Scarabaeidae. It is found in Mexico (Distrito Federal).

== Description ==
Adults reach a length of about 6.5–7.5 mm (0.26–0.30 in). They have an elongate, moderately convex, shiny, glabrous, chestnut-brown body, with the legs and antennal club somewhat darker.

== Life history ==
Specimens have been collected in the nest of Cratogeomys merriami.

== Etymology ==
The species is named for the type locality, Ixtapalapa (Distrito Federal, Mexico).
