= Geomyphilus russeus =

Scientific classification
- Kingdom: Animalia
- Phylum: Arthropoda
- Clade: Pancrustacea
- Class: Insecta
- Order: Coleoptera
- Suborder: Polyphaga
- Infraorder: Scarabaeiformia
- Family: Scarabaeidae
- Genus: Geomyphilus
- Species: G. russeus

Binomial name
- Geomyphilus russeus (Brown, 1928)

Synonyms
- Aphodius (Platyderides) russeus Brown, 1928

Species of beetle

Geomyphilus russeus is a species of beetle of the family Scarabaeidae. It is found in the United States (Arizona, Illinois, Iowa, Kansas, Nebraska, New Mexico, North Dakota, Oklahoma).

== Description ==
Adults reach a length of about 6–7.5 mm (0.24–0.30 in). They have an oblong, moderately convex. shiny, glabrous, pale reddish-brown body, with the head and pronotum slightly darker.

== Life history ==
Specimens have been collected in the burrows of Geomys bursarius.
