= Poblana squamata =

Conservation status
- Critically Endangered (IUCN 3.1)

Scientific classification
- Kingdom: Animalia
- Phylum: Chordata
- Class: Actinopterygii
- Order: Atheriniformes
- Family: Atherinopsidae
- Genus: Poblana
- Species: P. squamata

Binomial name
- Poblana squamata Álvarez, 1950

Species of fish

Poblana squamata, the Quechulac silverside, is a species of neotropical silverside endemic to Mexico. It is only found in the volcanic crater lake of Quechulac which is 6.5 kilometres (4.0 miles) southeast of Alchichica, Puebla State, Mexico at an elevation of 2,365 metres (7,759 ft). It was first described by Jose Álvarez del Villar in 1950 from types collected from the lake.

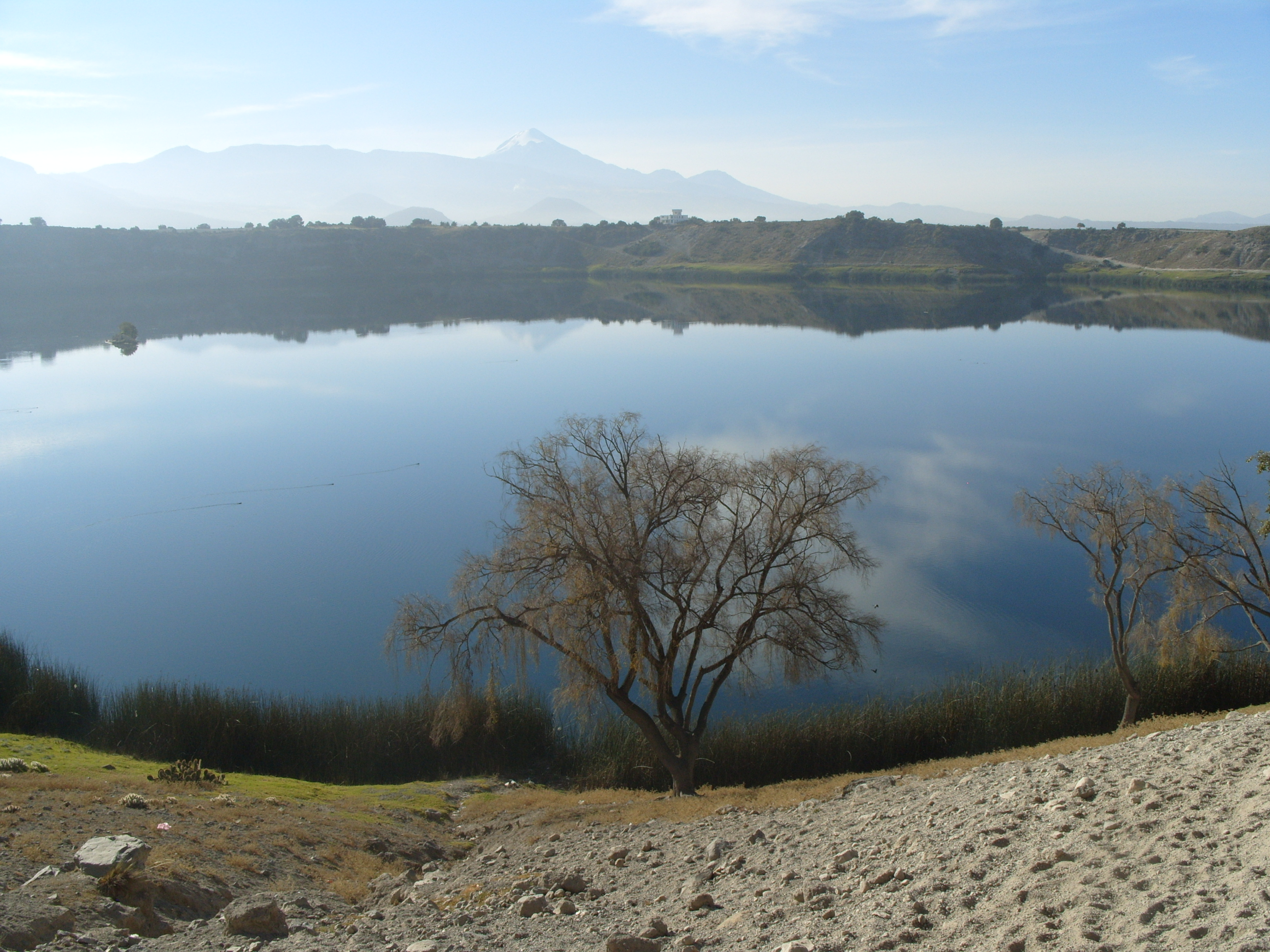
Laguna de Quechulac, Poblana squamata's habitat

The lake is approximately half a kilometre square and 39 metres (128 ft) deep. The fish only inhabit some areas of the lake, avoiding the steep slopes and preferring areas where sedges grow. Due to this extremely small habitat area, the species is listed as Critically Endangered on the IUCN Red List. While the lake is not affected by human alteration, there is danger of overfishing.

It prefers pelagic (open water) areas. Its diet is omnivorous and consists of crustaceans. algae, insects, and sometimes its own larvae.
