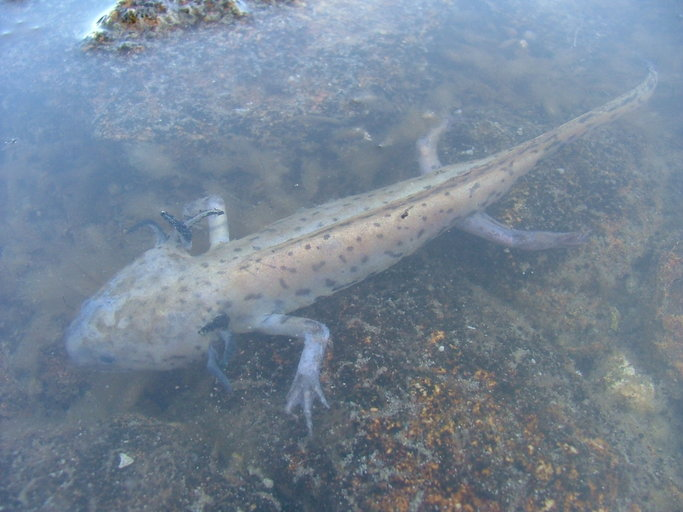

Conservation status
- Critically Endangered (IUCN 3.1)

Scientific classification
- Kingdom: Animalia
- Phylum: Chordata
- Class: Amphibia
- Order: Urodela
- Family: Ambystomatidae
- Genus: Ambystoma
- Species: A. taylori

Binomial name
- Ambystoma taylori Brandon, Maruska, and Rumph, 1982

= Taylor's salamander =

Species of amphibian

Taylor's salamander (Ambystoma taylori) is a species of salamander found only in Laguna Alchichica, a high-altitude (2,290 m (7,510 ft) above sea level) crater lake to the southwest of Perote, Mexico. It was first described in 1982 but had been known to science prior to that. It is a neotenic salamander, breeding while still in the larval state and not undergoing metamorphosis. The lake in which it lives is becoming increasingly saline and less suitable for the salamander, which is declining in numbers. The International Union for Conservation of Nature (IUCN) has rated it as being "critically endangered".

== Taxonomy ==
It was described in 1982 by Brandon, Maruska, and Rumph, and named for Edward Harrison Taylor (1889–1978), an American herpetologist. However, the species had been known to science long before then. Taylor himself attempted to describe the species as Ambystoma subsalsum in 1943, but mistakenly used a Mexican or plateau tiger salamander as the holotype. This rendered the name invalid, and made it into a synonym for the tiger salamander.

== Ecology ==
This salamander is moderately sized, with most individuals measuring 70 mm (2.8 in) being mature, while the largest one being 102–113 mm (4.0–4.4 in) in snout–vent length. It is a neotenic species, which means it retains its caudal fin and external gills into adulthood, never undergoing complete metamorphosis. It is entirely aquatic, breeding and laying its eggs in the same lake where it lives. Taylor's salamanders are pale yellowish in color, with dark spots along their dorsal sides. They have relatively short, thick external gill stalks. Their heads are quite large, and their limbs are underdeveloped, as in most Ambystoma neotenes. They feed by buccal suction, and are omnivores.

== Habitat ==
The A. taylori habitat in Lake Alchichica is brackish, with a salinity of 9.2 g/L (0.00033 lb/cu in). It is also very alkaline, with a pH of 8.5–10. The lake's water has a temperature range of 18–21 °C (64–70 °F). The salamanders typically hide below the water line, under overhangs in the crater's edge, and into the deep water.

== Status ==
Lake Alchichica is becoming more saline as water is extracted for irrigation and drinking. The level of the lake has fallen and if this deterioration in water quality continues, this salamander is likely to become extinct. The International Union for Conservation of Nature has assessed the salamander's conservation status as being "critically endangered" and has proposed that a captive breeding programme be established.
