= Coelotrachelus symbius =

Scientific classification
- Kingdom: Animalia
- Phylum: Arthropoda
- Clade: Pancrustacea
- Class: Insecta
- Order: Coleoptera
- Suborder: Polyphaga
- Infraorder: Scarabaeiformia
- Family: Scarabaeidae
- Genus: Coelotrachelus
- Species: C. symbius

Binomial name
- Coelotrachelus symbius (Gordon & Howden, 1973)

Synonyms
- Aphodius symbius Gordon & Howden, 1973

Species of beetle

Coelotrachelus symbius is a species of beetle of the family Scarabaeidae. It is found in Mexico (Durango, Sinaloa).

== Description ==
Adults reach a length of about 6–7 mm (0.24–0.28 in). They have an elongate-oval, moderately convex, shiny, glabrous, dark reddish to light brown body. The legs are brown-reddish and the antennal club is testaceous.

== Life history ==
Specimens have been collected in the burrows of gophers.
