= Coelotrachelus burgosi =

Scientific classification
- Kingdom: Animalia
- Phylum: Arthropoda
- Clade: Pancrustacea
- Class: Insecta
- Order: Coleoptera
- Suborder: Polyphaga
- Infraorder: Scarabaeiformia
- Family: Scarabaeidae
- Genus: Coelotrachelus
- Species: C. burgosi

Binomial name
- Coelotrachelus burgosi (Deloya & Mccarty, 1992)

Synonyms
- Aphodius (Coelotrachelus) burgosi Deloya & Mccarty, 1992

Species of beetle

Coelotrachelus burgosi is a species of beetle of the family Scarabaeidae. It is found in Mexico (Morelos).

== Description ==
Adults reach a length of about 6 mm (0.24 in). They have an elongate, moderately convex, strongly shiny, glabrous, reddish body, with the legs and antennal club somewhat darker.
