= List of lakes of Mexico =

The following is a list of lakes of Mexico.

== Chihuahua ==
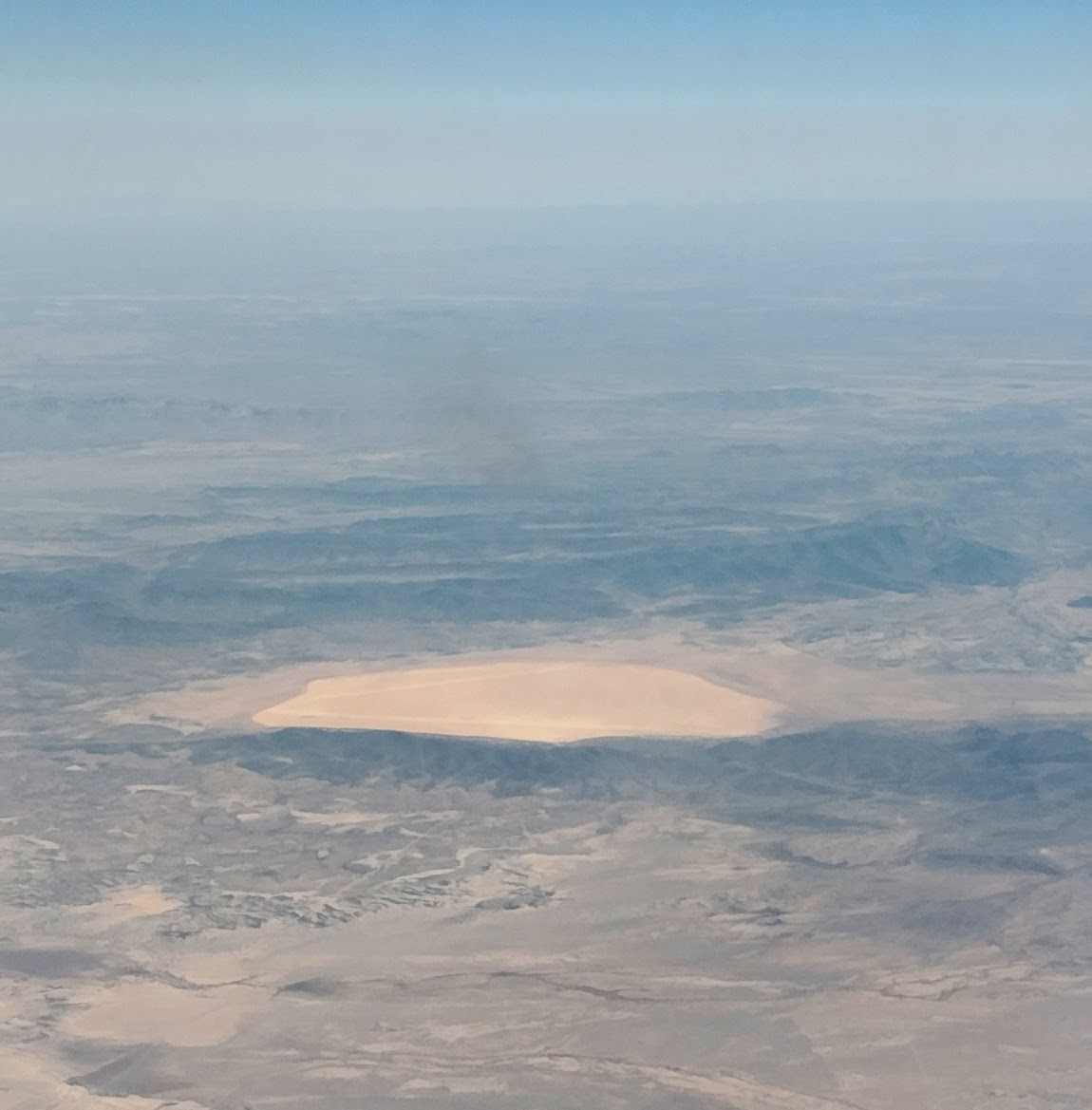
Chincuas Lake, in La Cruz Municipality.

- Arareko lake
- Babícora lake
- Bustillos lake
- Chincuas lake
- Fierro Lake
- Guzmán lake
- Hormigas lake
- Lakes las chivas
- La Colina lake
- Mexicanos lake

== Durango ==
- Lake Palmito
- Lake Santiaguillo

== Jalisco ==
- Lake Chapala (also in Michoacán)
- Lake Sayula
- Lake Cajititlán
- Lake San Marcos
- Lake Atotonilco

== Mexico City ==
- Lake Xochimilco
- Lake Xico
- Lake Cacho
- Lake Ceko

== Michoacán ==
- Lake Cuitzeo
- Lake Pátzcuaro
- Lake Zirahuén

== Nayarit ==
- Lake Agua Milpa
- Lake Cerro Prieto
- Lake Cuchillo
- Lake Marychivas

== Puebla ==
- Lake Alchichica
- Lake Aljojuca
- Lake Atexcac
- Lake La Preciosa
- Lake Quechulac
- Lake Tecuitlapa
- Lake Tepeyahualco
- Lake Totolcinco

== Quintana Roo ==
- Lake Bacalar
- Lake Chichancanab

== Sinaloa ==
- Lake Baccarac
- Lake Comedero
- Lake Dominguez
- Lake Hidalgo
- Lake Huites
- Lake Mateos
- Lake Salto

== Tamaulipas ==
- Lake Guerrero

== Veracruz ==
- Lake Catemaco

== Uncategorized ==
- Lake Espanolia
- Lake Lavaderosa
- Lake Méndezi
- Lake Mimbresa
- Lake Mocuzaria
- Laguna Tortugaio

== See also ==
- List of lakes
