= Alchichica silverside =

Conservation status
- Critically Endangered (IUCN 3.1)

Scientific classification
- Kingdom: Animalia
- Phylum: Chordata
- Class: Actinopterygii
- Order: Atheriniformes
- Family: Atherinopsidae
- Genus: Poblana
- Species: P. alchichica

Binomial name
- Poblana alchichica F. de Buen, 1945

Species of fish

The Alchichica silverside (Poblana alchichica) is a species of neotropical silverside endemic to Lake Alchichica in Mexico.

Poblana achichica measures up to 10 in. (25 cm). According to a 2001 book, information on its breeding habits are not widely known and its primary food source is small aquatic invertebrates. The threats to Poblana achichica are largemouth bass and the habitat destruction from people.

This species was described by Fernando de Buen y Lozano in 1945 from a type locality of Lake Alchichica.
