= Geomyphilus geronimo =

Scientific classification
- Kingdom: Animalia
- Phylum: Arthropoda
- Clade: Pancrustacea
- Class: Insecta
- Order: Coleoptera
- Suborder: Polyphaga
- Infraorder: Scarabaeiformia
- Family: Scarabaeidae
- Genus: Geomyphilus
- Species: G. geronimo

Binomial name
- Geomyphilus geronimo Gordon & Skelley, 2007

Species of beetle

Geomyphilus geronimo is a species of beetle of the family Scarabaeidae. It is found in the United States (Arizona).

== Description ==
Adults reach a length of about 4.5–5 mm (0.18–0.20 in). They have an elongate-oval, convex, weakly shiny, almost glabrous, yellowish-brown body. The head, pronotum and elytral suture are reddish-brown, the legs are yellowish and the antennal club is testaceous.

== Life history ==
Specimens have been collected in decomposing litter of Dipodomys spectabilis.
