= Geomyphilus viceversus =

Scientific classification
- Kingdom: Animalia
- Phylum: Arthropoda
- Clade: Pancrustacea
- Class: Insecta
- Order: Coleoptera
- Suborder: Polyphaga
- Infraorder: Scarabaeiformia
- Family: Scarabaeidae
- Genus: Geomyphilus
- Species: G. viceversus

Binomial name
- Geomyphilus viceversus (Paulsen, 2006)

Synonyms
- Aphodius viceversus Paulsen, 2006

Species of beetle

Geomyphilus viceversus is a species of beetle of the family Scarabaeidae. It is found in the United States (Kansas, Nebraska).

== Description ==
Adults reach a length of about 4.4–5.4 mm (0.17–0.21 in). They have an elongate body. The head, pronotum, elytra and ventral surface are dark brown, while the margin of the clypeus, lateral margin of the pronotum, elytral suture, legs and antennae are lighter brown.

== Life history ==
Specimens have been collected in the burrows of Cynomys ludovicianus.

== Etymology ==
The species name is derived from Latin vice versa (meaning turned about) and refers to the male protibial spur, which is turned the other way when compared to the similar species Geomyphilus leptotarsis.
