= Coelotrachelus rudis =

Scientific classification
- Kingdom: Animalia
- Phylum: Arthropoda
- Clade: Pancrustacea
- Class: Insecta
- Order: Coleoptera
- Suborder: Polyphaga
- Infraorder: Scarabaeiformia
- Family: Scarabaeidae
- Genus: Coelotrachelus
- Species: C. rudis

Binomial name
- Coelotrachelus rudis (LeConte, 1878)

Synonyms
- Aphodius rudis LeConte, 1878; Aphodius fenyesi Van Dyke, 1947

Species of beetle

Coelotrachelus rudis is a species of beetle of the family Scarabaeidae. It is found in the United States (Arizona, Colorado, New Mexico) and Mexico (Chihuahua, Sonora).

== Description ==
Adults reach a length of about 6–7.5 mm (0.24–0.30 in). They have an elongate, moderately convex, shiny, glabrous, chestnut-brown body, with the disc of the pronotum somewhat darker and with the antennal club pale testaceous.

== Life history ==
Specimens have been collected in the burrows of Cynomys gunnisoni and Thomomys species.
