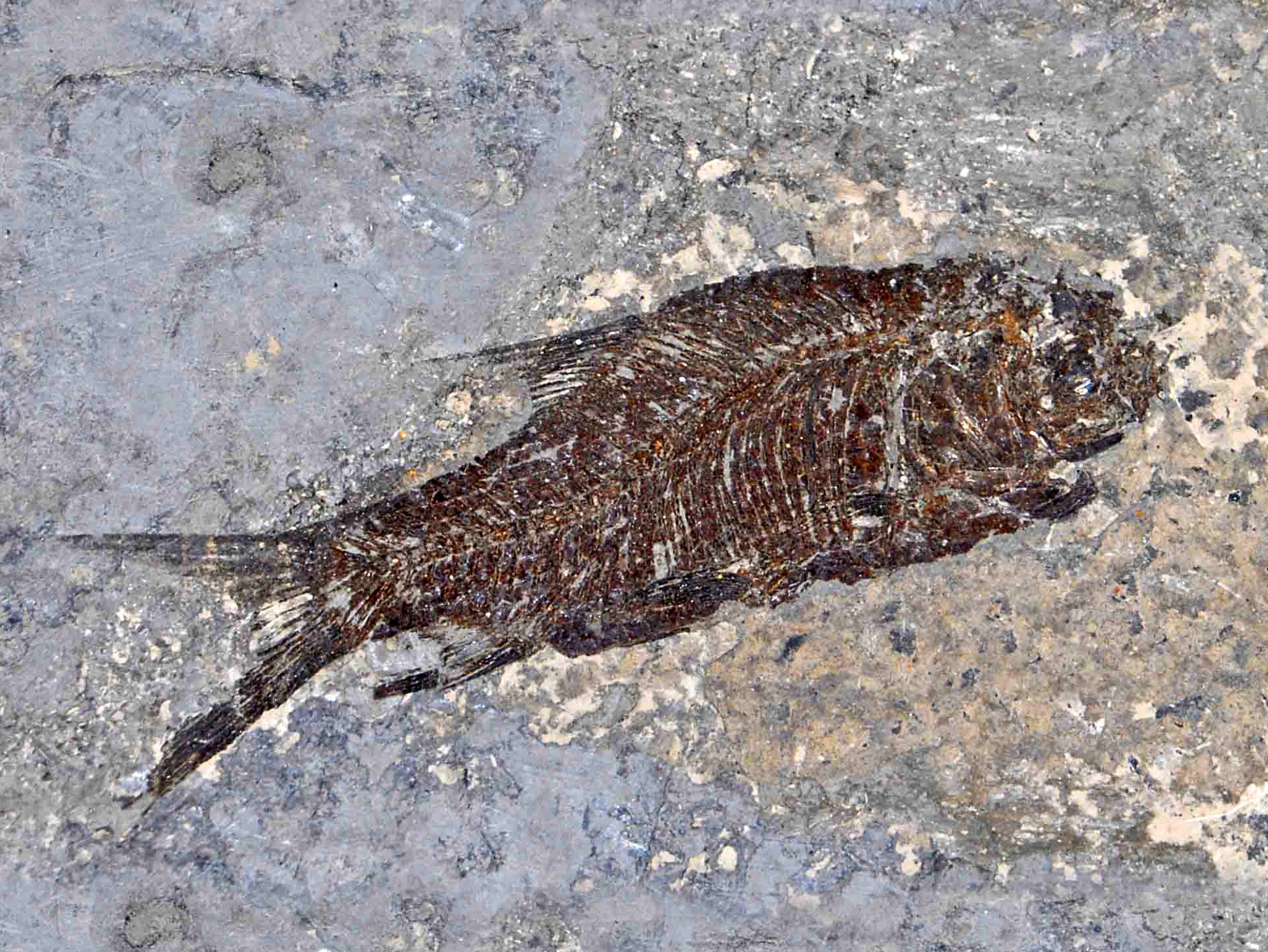
- Fossil of J. hubeiensis from China

Scientific classification
- Kingdom: Animalia
- Phylum: Chordata
- Class: Actinopterygii
- Division: Teleostei
- Order: Cypriniformes
- Family: †Jianghanichthyidae; Liu, Chang, Wilson & Murray, 2015
- Genus: †Jianghanichthys; Lei, 1987

Type species
- †Osteochilus hubeiensis Lei, 1977

Species
- †J. huachongensis Liu & Zhang, 2026; †J. hubeiensis (Lei, 1977); †J. sanshuiensis (Li & Wang, 1979)

= Jianghanichthys =

Jianghanichthys Temporal range: Late Paleocene to Middle Eocene

Extinct genus of fishes

Jianghanichthys is an extinct genus of freshwater cypriniform fish from the Late Paleocene to Early Eocene of central and southern China, and the only member of the family Jianghanichthyidae. It is the oldest cypriniform fish known from body fossils, and the most basal known cypriniform.

The genus name Jianghanichthys derives from "Jianghan", the place where the first fossil remains of J. hubeiensis were found, and "ichthys" derives from the Greek word for 'fish'. It is also known as the "Chan Han fish" in the fossil trade.

== Taxonomy ==
Three species are known, two of which were previously placed in Osteochilus:

- †J. huachongensis Liu & Zhang, 2026 - middle-late Eocene of Guangdong, China (Huachong Formation)
- †J. hubeiensis (Lei, 1977) (type species) - Early Eocene (Ypresian) of Hubei, China (Yangxi Formation)
- †J. sanshuiensis (Li & Wang, 1979) - Late Paleocene (Thanetian) and Ypresian of Guangdong, China (Buxin Formation) (=Osteochilus laticorpus Li & Wang, 1979, O. longipinnatus Li & Wang, 1979)

There are still disagreements as to the scientific classification, name and age of this genus. However the body shape of Jianghanichthys differs from that of all Amyzon species. J. hubeiensis was reclassified from Osteochilus into the new genus Jianghanichthys in 1987, and in 2015 it was moved from the Catostomidae to the new, basal family Jianghanichthyidae. In 2024, the slightly older species J. sanshuiensis was also reclassified into this genus from Osteochilus, marking both a slight temporal extension and a range extension for the genus. A new slightly younger species, J. huachongensis, was described in 2026. Specimens of J. huachongensis, are known to have exceptionally well-preserved sensory canals that differ from those of other species in the genus, suggesting that there was a much greater degree of morphological diversity within early-diverging cypriniform clades.

== Distribution ==
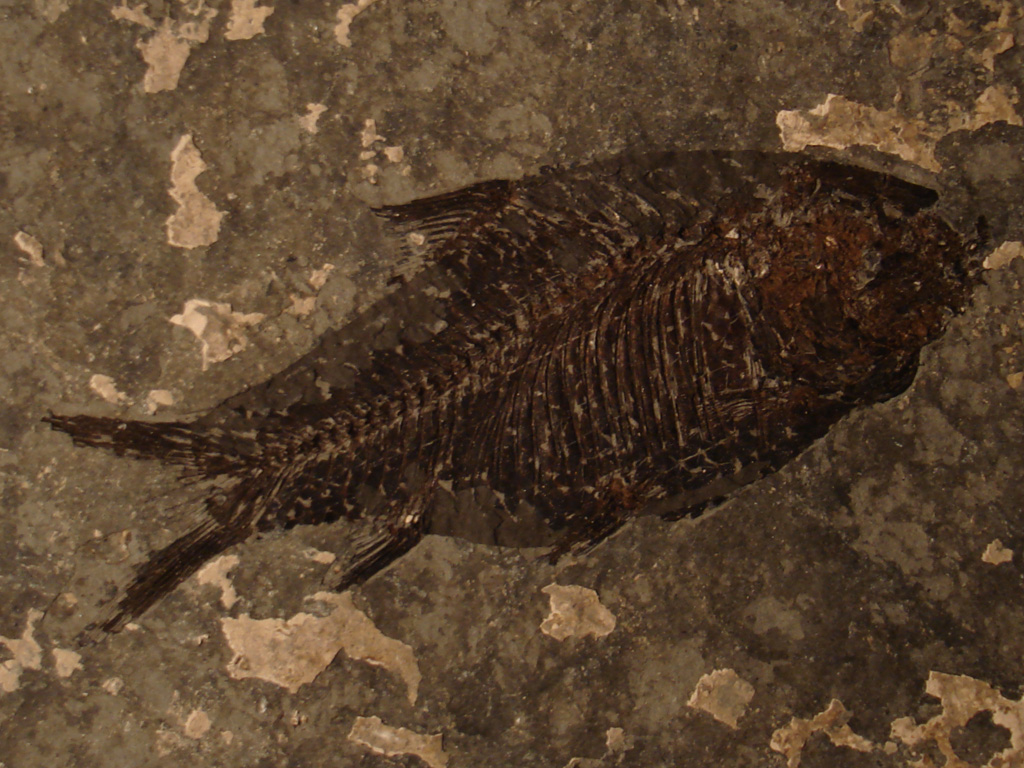
Fossil of J. hubeiensis

These fishes lived in the early Paleogene period. Fossils of Jianghanichthys have been found in Hubei and Guangdong, China.

Fossils of J. hubeiensis are quite common and can be found in most shops. Most of these are among the thousands of well-preserved J. hubeiensis fossils which were discovered in an outcrop in a farm near Songzi in the 1980s. However, overcollection by commercial fossil collectors had destroyed this locality by 2005, though some new specimens have since been discovered with later fieldwork.
