= Coelotrachelus venustus =

Scientific classification
- Kingdom: Animalia
- Phylum: Arthropoda
- Clade: Pancrustacea
- Class: Insecta
- Order: Coleoptera
- Suborder: Polyphaga
- Infraorder: Scarabaeiformia
- Family: Scarabaeidae
- Genus: Coelotrachelus
- Species: C. venustus

Binomial name
- Coelotrachelus venustus (Schmidt, 1910)

Synonyms
- Aphodius venustus Schmidt, 1910

Species of beetle

Coelotrachelus venustus is a species of beetle of the family Scarabaeidae. It is found in Mexico (México).

== Description ==
Adults reach a length of about 8 mm (0.31 in). They have an elongate, moderately convex, strongly shiny, glabrous, brown-reddish body, with the antennal club pale testaceous.
