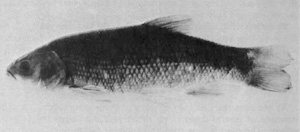

Conservation status
- Critically endangered, possibly extinct (IUCN 3.1)

Scientific classification
- Kingdom: Animalia
- Phylum: Chordata
- Class: Actinopterygii
- Division: Teleostei
- Order: Cypriniformes
- Family: Leuciscidae
- Genus: Gila
- Species: †G. crassicauda

Binomial name
- †Gila crassicauda (S. F. Baird & Girard in Girard, 1854)

Synonyms
- Lavinia crassicauda S. F. Baird & Girard, 1854; Lavinia conformis S. F. Baird & Girard, 1854; Leuciscus gibbosus Ayres, 1854; Lavinia gibbosa (Ayres, 1854); Tigoma crassa Girard, 1856

= Thicktail chub =

Species of fish

The thicktail chub (Gila crassicauda) was a type of minnow that inhabited the lowlands and weedy backwaters of the Sacramento and San Joaquin Rivers in the Central Valley of California. It was once abundant in lowland lakes, marshes, ponds, slow-moving stretches of river, and, during years of heavy run-off, the surface waters of San Francisco Bay. The thicktail chub was one of the most common fish in California. Within Native American middens it represented 40% of the fish.

The chub was a favored food of the indigenous peoples of Clear Lake and the Central Valley before being heavily exploited by commercial fishermen supplying the San Francisco market. A heavy-bodied fish with a thick tail and a small, cone-shaped head, the backs of the thicktail chub ranged in color from greenish brown to purplish black, while the sides and belly were yellow. It could reach a length of nearly ten inches. Although little is known about its behavior, it was probably carnivorous, feeding on small fish and invertebrates.

The primary cause of the thicktailed chub's extinction was the conversion of much of the Central Valley to agricultural use. Most of its habitat was destroyed by the drainage of sloughs and marshes, dam-building, and water diversion for irrigation. All this resulted in the loss of the sluggish water the species preferred. Competition from exotic species also contributed to its extinction. The last known example was caught on April 16, 1957.
