= Geomyphilus ungulatus =

Scientific classification
- Kingdom: Animalia
- Phylum: Arthropoda
- Clade: Pancrustacea
- Class: Insecta
- Order: Coleoptera
- Suborder: Polyphaga
- Infraorder: Scarabaeiformia
- Family: Scarabaeidae
- Genus: Geomyphilus
- Species: G. ungulatus

Binomial name
- Geomyphilus ungulatus (Fall, 1901)

Synonyms
- Aphodius ungulatus Fall, 1901

Species of beetle

Geomyphilus ungulatus is a species of beetle of the family Scarabaeidae. It is found in the United States (California).

== Description ==
Adults reach a length of about 5–6 mm (0.20–0.24 in). They have an oblong, moderately convex, moderately shiny, glabrous body. The head and pronotum are piceous, the margin of the clypeus and sides of the pronotum are reddish and the elytra are dirty yellow. The legs are pale brown and the antennal club is fuscous.
