= Geomyphilus tuzincola =

Scientific classification
- Kingdom: Animalia
- Phylum: Arthropoda
- Clade: Pancrustacea
- Class: Insecta
- Order: Coleoptera
- Suborder: Polyphaga
- Infraorder: Scarabaeiformia
- Family: Scarabaeidae
- Genus: Geomyphilus
- Species: G. tuzincola

Binomial name
- Geomyphilus tuzincola Dellacasa, Dellacasa, Skelley & Gordon, 2017

Species of beetle

Geomyphilus tuzincola is a species of beetle of the family Scarabaeidae. It is found in Mexico (México, Querétaro).

== Description ==
Adults reach a length of about 4.5–5 mm (0.18–0.20 in). They have an elongate, moderately convex, shiny, glabrous, piceous body. The margin of the clypeus, sides of the pronotum and apical margins of the elytra are reddish-brown, while the legs are reddish and the antennal club is piceous.

== Life history ==
Specimens have been collected in the nests of rodents.

== Etymology ==
The species name is a combination of Mexican tuza (which is used for several species of rodents) and Latin incola (meaning inhabitant).
