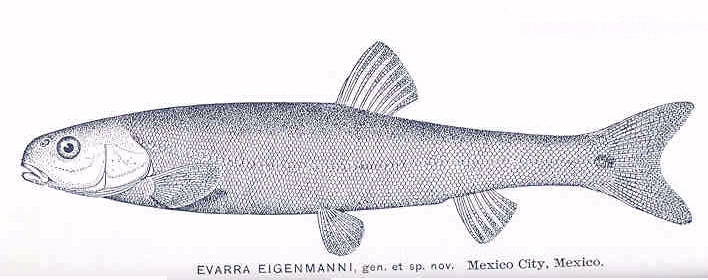
- Plateau chub (Evarra eigenmanni)

Scientific classification
- Kingdom: Animalia
- Phylum: Chordata
- Class: Actinopterygii
- Order: Cypriniformes
- Family: Leuciscidae
- Subfamily: Laviniinae
- Genus: †Evarra; Woolman, 1894

Type species
- †Evarra eigenmanni Woolman, 1895

Species
- See text

= Evarra =

Extinct genus of fishes

Evarra was a genus of small ray-finned fish in the family Leuciscidae. All species in the genus were restricted to waters in the Valley of Mexico and are now extinct due to habitat loss (their habitat dried out with remaining waters in the region highly polluted).

== Species ==
- †Evarra bustamantei Navarro, 1955 (Mexican dace)
- †Evarra eigenmanni Woolman, 1894 (plateau chub)
- †Evarra tlahuacensis Meek, 1902 (endorheic chub)
