= Geomyphilus =

Scientific classification
- Kingdom: Animalia
- Phylum: Arthropoda
- Clade: Pancrustacea
- Class: Insecta
- Order: Coleoptera
- Suborder: Polyphaga
- Infraorder: Scarabaeiformia
- Family: Scarabaeidae
- Subfamily: Aphodiinae
- Tribe: Aphodiini
- Genus: Geomyphilus; Gordon & Skelley, 2007

Genus of beetles

Geomyphilus is a genus of beetles of the family Scarabaeidae.

== Species ==
- Geomyphilus alabama (Skelley & Gordon, 1995)
- Geomyphilus barrerai (Islas, 1955)
- Geomyphilus coronadoi (Islas, 1955)
- Geomyphilus essigi (Saylor, 1935)
- Geomyphilus geronimo Gordon & Skelley, 2007
- Geomyphilus insolitus (Brown, 1928)
- Geomyphilus kiowensis (Gordon & Salsbury, 1999)
- Geomyphilus leptotarsis (Brown, 1928)
- Geomyphilus pierai (Lobo & Deloya, 1996)
- Geomyphilus pinolus Gordon & Skelley, 2007
- Geomyphilus rubiginosus (Horn, 1870)
- Geomyphilus russeus (Brown, 1928)
- Geomyphilus thomomysi (Brown, 1928)
- Geomyphilus tuzincola Dellacasa, Dellacasa, Skelley & Gordon, 2017
- Geomyphilus ungulatus (Fall, 1901)
- Geomyphilus viceversus (Paulsen, 2006)
