= Geomyphilus rubiginosus =

Scientific classification
- Kingdom: Animalia
- Phylum: Arthropoda
- Clade: Pancrustacea
- Class: Insecta
- Order: Coleoptera
- Suborder: Polyphaga
- Infraorder: Scarabaeiformia
- Family: Scarabaeidae
- Genus: Geomyphilus
- Species: G. rubiginosus

Binomial name
- Geomyphilus rubiginosus (Horn, 1870)

Synonyms
- Aphodius rubiginosus Horn, 1870

Species of beetle

Geomyphilus rubiginosus is a species of beetle of the family Scarabaeidae. It is found in the United States (Arizona).

== Description ==
Adults reach a length of about 4–5 mm (0.16–0.20 in). They have a moderately elongate, moderately convex, feebly shiny, glabrous, red to dark brown body. The disc of the pronotum is somewhat darker. The antennal club is rufo-testaceous.

== Life history ==
Specimens have been collected in the burrows (and reared from dung) of Thomomys bottae.
