= Coelotrachelus =

Scientific classification
- Kingdom: Animalia
- Phylum: Arthropoda
- Clade: Pancrustacea
- Class: Insecta
- Order: Coleoptera
- Suborder: Polyphaga
- Infraorder: Scarabaeiformia
- Family: Scarabaeidae
- Subfamily: Aphodiinae
- Tribe: Aphodiini
- Genus: Coelotrachelus; Schmidt, 1914

Synonyms
- Aphodius (Coelotrachelus) Schmidt, 1914

Genus of beetles

Coelotrachelus is a genus of beetles of the family Scarabaeidae.

== Species ==
- Coelotrachelus burgosi (Deloya & Mccarty, 1992)
- Coelotrachelus ixtapalapaensis Dellacasa, Dellacasa & Gordon, 2009
- Coelotrachelus kuntzeni (Schmidt, 1914)
- Coelotrachelus macgregori (Islas, 1955)
- Coelotrachelus rudis (LeConte, 1878)
- Coelotrachelus symbius (Gordon & Howden, 1973)
- Coelotrachelus venustus (Schmidt, 1910)
