= Geomyphilus kiowensis =

Scientific classification
- Kingdom: Animalia
- Phylum: Arthropoda
- Clade: Pancrustacea
- Class: Insecta
- Order: Coleoptera
- Suborder: Polyphaga
- Infraorder: Scarabaeiformia
- Family: Scarabaeidae
- Genus: Geomyphilus
- Species: G. kiowensis

Binomial name
- Geomyphilus kiowensis (Gordon & Salsbury, 1999)

Synonyms
- Aphodius kiowensis Gordon & Salsbury, 1999

Species of beetle

Geomyphilus kiowensis is a species of beetle of the family Scarabaeidae. It is found in the United States (Kansas, Nebraska, Texas).

== Description ==
Adults reach a length of about 4.5–5 mm (0.18–0.20 in). They have an elongate, convex, moderately shiny, almost glabrous, yellowish-brown body, with the head and pronotum reddish-brown and slightly darker. The legs are yellowish-brown and the antennal club is dark brown.

== Life history ==
Specimens have been collected near rodent communities.
