= Geomyphilus insolitus =

Scientific classification
- Kingdom: Animalia
- Phylum: Arthropoda
- Clade: Pancrustacea
- Class: Insecta
- Order: Coleoptera
- Suborder: Polyphaga
- Infraorder: Scarabaeiformia
- Family: Scarabaeidae
- Genus: Geomyphilus
- Species: G. insolitus

Binomial name
- Geomyphilus insolitus (Brown, 1928)

Synonyms
- Aphodius (Platyderides) insolitus Brown, 1928

Species of beetle

Geomyphilus insolitus is a species of beetle of the family Scarabaeidae. It is found in the United States (Arkansas, Illinois, Indiana, Iowa, Kansas, Louisiana, Oklahoma, Wisconsin, Texas, Wisconsin).

== Description ==
Adults reach a length of about 4.5–6 mm (0.18–0.24 in). They have an elongate-oblong, moderately convex, shiny, glabrous, pale reddish-brown body. Part of the head and the disc of the pronotum are brownish and the legs and antennal club are pale reddish-brown.

== Life history ==
Specimens have been collected in the burrows of Geomys bursarius.
