= Coelotrachelus macgregori =

Scientific classification
- Kingdom: Animalia
- Phylum: Arthropoda
- Clade: Pancrustacea
- Class: Insecta
- Order: Coleoptera
- Suborder: Polyphaga
- Infraorder: Scarabaeiformia
- Family: Scarabaeidae
- Genus: Coelotrachelus
- Species: C. macgregori

Binomial name
- Coelotrachelus macgregori (Islas, 1955)

Synonyms
- Aphodius (Coelotrachelus) macgregori Islas, 1955; Geomyphilus macgregori

Species of beetle

Coelotrachelus macgregori is a species of beetle of the family Scarabaeidae. It is found in Mexico (Distrito Federal, México, Morelos).

== Description ==
Adults reach a length of about 4–6 mm (0.16–0.24 in). They have a moderately shiny, strongly dark reddish-brown body, with the sides of the pronotum paler.
