= Geomyphilus essigi =

Scientific classification
- Kingdom: Animalia
- Phylum: Arthropoda
- Clade: Pancrustacea
- Class: Insecta
- Order: Coleoptera
- Suborder: Polyphaga
- Infraorder: Scarabaeiformia
- Family: Scarabaeidae
- Genus: Geomyphilus
- Species: G. essigi

Binomial name
- Geomyphilus essigi (Saylor, 1935)

Synonyms
- Aphodius essigi Saylor, 1935

Species of beetle

Geomyphilus essigi is a species of beetle of the family Scarabaeidae. It is found in the United States (California).

== Description ==
Adults reach a length of about 4–4.5 mm (0.16–0.18 in). They have an oblong, convex, moderately shiny, glabrous body. Part of the head, the sides of the pronotum and legs are reddish-brown, while the elytra are dark yellowish-brown and the antennal club is rufo-piceous.

== Life history ==
Specimens have been collected in the nests of gophers.
