= Lake Arareco =

Lake in the Chihuahua state, Mexico

Lake Arareko
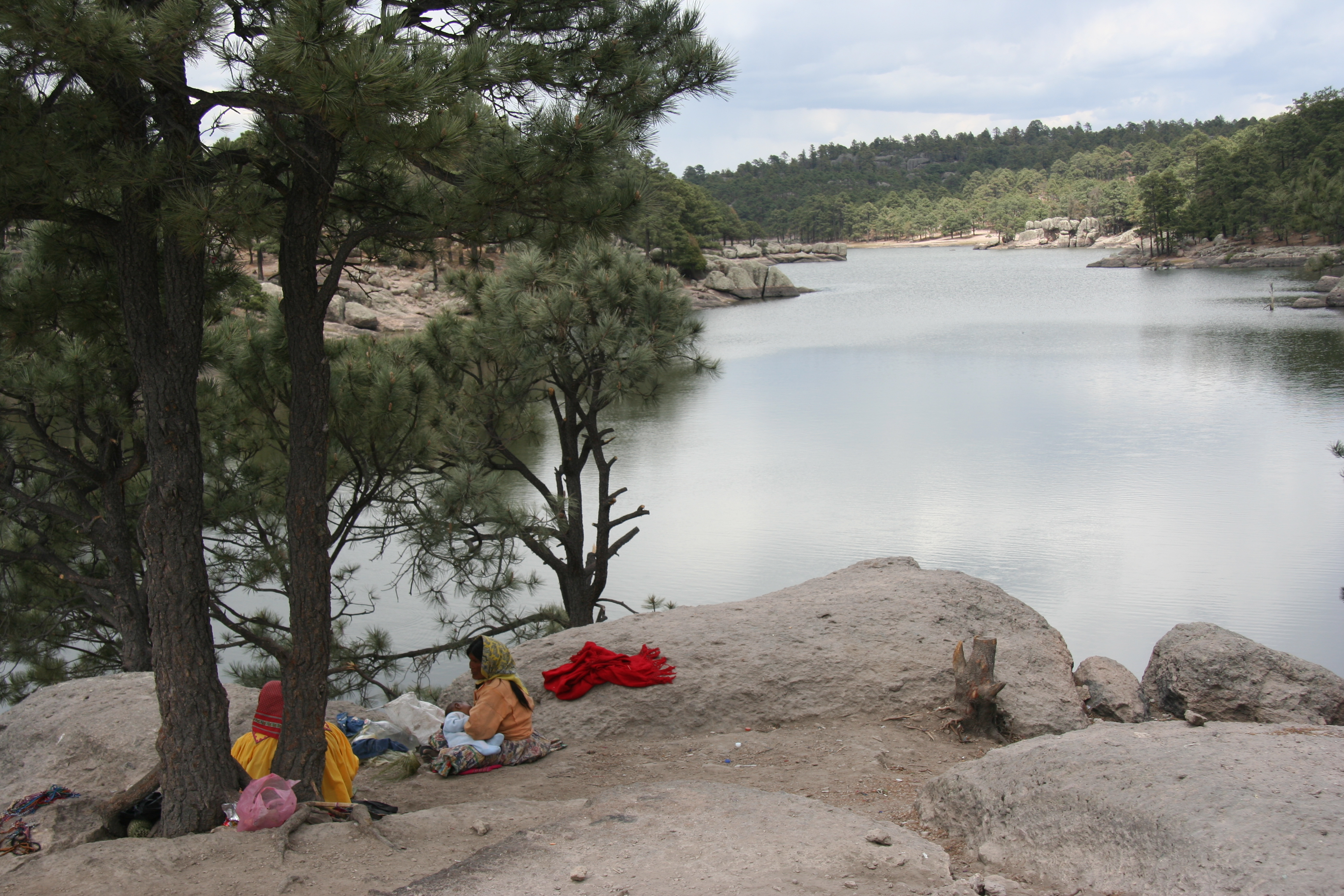

- Location within Chihuahua Location within Mexico
- Location: Bocoyna Municipality, Chihuahua
- Coordinates: 27°42′42″N 107°35′31″W
- Basin countries: Mexico

Lake Arareco is a lake high in the Sierra Madre Occidental range, within Chihuahua state in northwestern Mexico.

The lake is U-shaped. It is surrounded by unusual rock formations, and a fragrant pine forest.

It is located about 14 km (8.7 mi) south of Creel. A few kilometres away a scenic canyon has the Cascada Cusárare waterfall, which drops 30 m (98 ft).

== See also ==
- Sierra Madre Occidental pine-oak forests
