= Endorheic chub =

Conservation status
- Extinct (IUCN 3.1)

Scientific classification
- Kingdom: Animalia
- Phylum: Chordata
- Class: Actinopterygii
- Division: Teleostei
- Order: Cypriniformes
- Family: Leuciscidae
- Genus: †Evarra
- Species: †E. tlahuacensis

Binomial name
- †Evarra tlahuacensis Meek, 1902

Extinct species of fish

The endorheic chub (Evarra tlahuacensis) is an extinct species of ray-finned fish in the family Leuciscidae. It was found only in Mexico.
