= Poblana letholepis =

Conservation status
- Critically Endangered (IUCN 3.1)

Scientific classification
- Kingdom: Animalia
- Phylum: Chordata
- Class: Actinopterygii
- Order: Atheriniformes
- Family: Atherinopsidae
- Genus: Poblana
- Species: P. letholepis

Binomial name
- Poblana letholepis Álvarez, 1950

Species of fish

Poblana letholepis, the La Preciosa silverside is a species of neotropical silverside endemic to Mexico. It was described by Jose Álvarez del Villar in 1950 from types collected from the crater lake of La Preciosa which is 4 kilometres (2.5 miles) southeast of Alchichica, Puebla State, Mexico at and elevation of 2,365 metres (7,759 ft).
