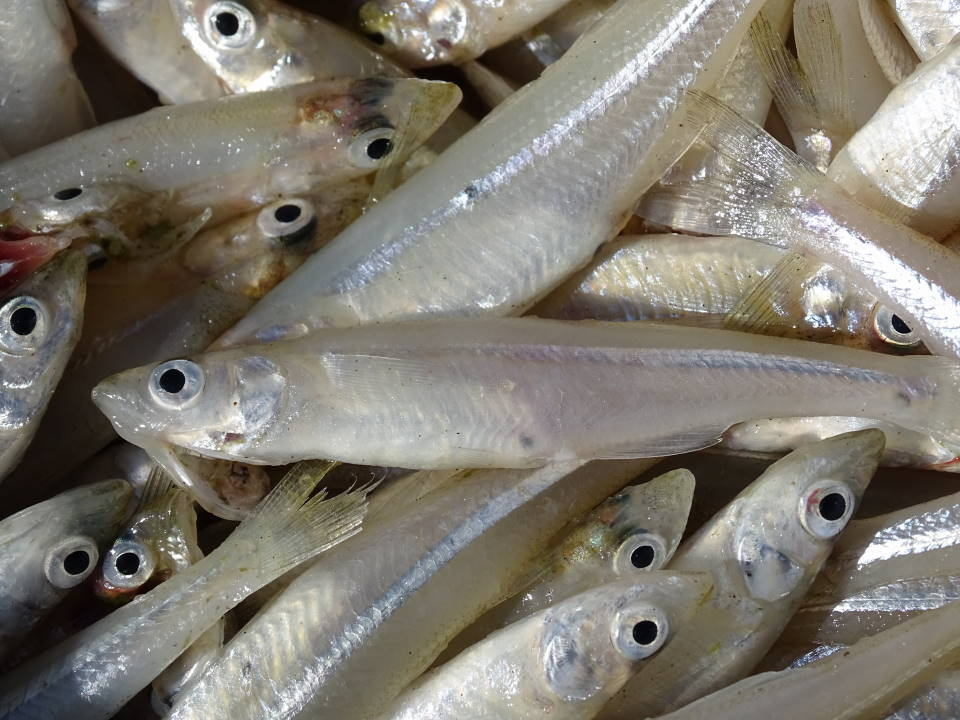
- P. ferdebueni in Tlaxcala, Mexico

Conservation status
- Critically Endangered (IUCN 3.1)

Scientific classification
- Kingdom: Animalia
- Phylum: Chordata
- Class: Actinopterygii
- Order: Atheriniformes
- Family: Atherinopsidae
- Genus: Poblana
- Species: P. ferdebueni

Binomial name
- Poblana ferdebueni Solórzano & Y. López, 1965

= Poblana ferdebueni =

Species of fish

Poblana ferdebueni, the Chignahuapan silverside is a species of neotropical silverside endemic to Mexico. This species was described by Aurelio Solórzano Preciado and Irma López-Guerrero in 1965 from a type locality of Laguna de Almoloya, Chignahuapan Lake, Puebla State, Mexico and was given the specific name ferdebueni to honour the Spanish ichthyologist Fernando de Buen y Lozano (1895-1962) who had originally proposed the genus Poblana.
