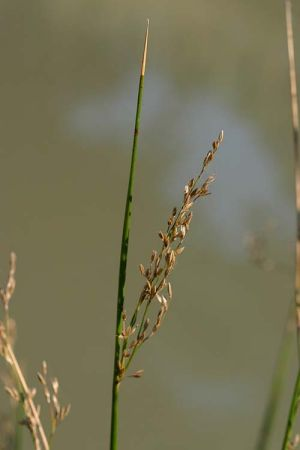

Conservation status
- Apparently Secure (NatureServe)

Scientific classification
- Kingdom: Plantae
- Clade: Tracheophytes
- Clade: Angiosperms
- Clade: Monocots
- Clade: Commelinids
- Order: Poales
- Family: Juncaceae
- Genus: Juncus
- Species: J. balticus
- Subspecies: J. b. subsp. mexicanus

Trinomial name
- Juncus balticus subsp. mexicanus (Willd. ex. Schult. & Schult.f.) Snogerup

Synonyms
- List: Agathryon balticum subsp. mexicanum (Willd. ex Schult. & Schult.f.) Záv.Drábk. & Proćków; Juncus arcticus var. mexicanus (Willd. ex Schult. & Schult.f.) Balslev; Juncus balticus var. columnaris Buchenau; Juncus balticus var. crassiculmis Buchenau; Juncus balticus var. durangensis Buchenau; Juncus balticus var. mexicanus (Willd. ex Schult. & Schult.f.) Kuntze; Juncus complanatus Schult. & Schult.f.; Juncus compressus Kunth, nom. illeg.; Juncus crassiculmis (Buchenau) Herter; Juncus mexicanus Willd. ex Schult. & Schult.f.; Juncus orizabae Liebm.

= Juncus balticus subsp. mexicanus =

Species of aquatic plant

Juncus balticus subsp. mexicanus, synonym Juncus mexicanus, is a species of rush known by the common name Mexican rush. It is native to much of the west of the United States, Mexico and Central and South America. It is a plant of moist areas in a great number of habitats, from coast to desert to mountain and low to high elevation.

== Description ==
This is a rhizomatous perennial herb which varies in appearance. The thin erect stems reach a maximum height anywhere from 10 to 80 centimeters. The leaves grow from the base of the stem and can exceed 20 centimeters in length. The inflorescence usually sprouts from the side of the stem rather than the tip.

The flowers grow on long peduncles. Each individual flower has thick tepals with longitudinal stripes which vary in color from bright to dark. It has six stamens with very large anthers, and long stigmas.

== Distribution ==
Juncus balticus subsp. mexicanus is native to the western and south-central United States (Arizona, California, Colorado, Nevada, New Mexico, Oregon, Texas, Utah, and Washington), much of Mexico, Costa Rica and Guatemala in Central America, and western South America (Argentina, Bolivia, Chile, and Peru).
