= Mexican dace =

Conservation status
- Extinct (IUCN 3.1)

Scientific classification
- Kingdom: Animalia
- Phylum: Chordata
- Class: Actinopterygii
- Division: Teleostei
- Order: Cypriniformes
- Family: Leuciscidae
- Genus: †Evarra
- Species: †E. bustamantei

Binomial name
- †Evarra bustamantei Navarro, 1955

Extinct species of fish

The Mexican dace (Evarra bustamantei), or Mexican chub, is an extinct species of ray-finned fish in the family Leuciscidae. It was found only in Mexico, in the canals and streams of the Valley of Mexico. It is estimated to have become extinct circa 1983. The extinction of this species coincided with the drying of water bodies in the valley. This drying was a result of the increasing demands placed on the water resources of the valley by agriculture, as well as by the growth of Mexico City and its suburbs.
