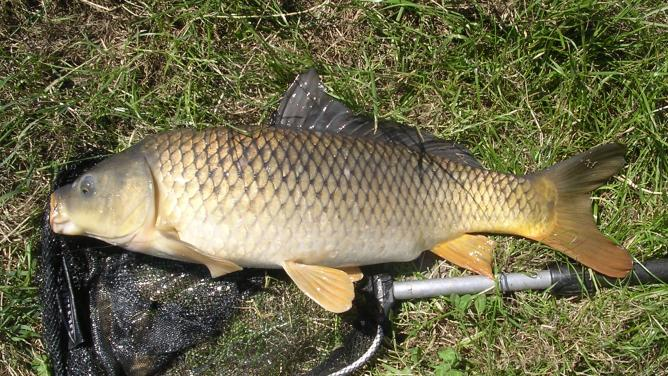
- A wild-type common carp (Cyprinus carpio, Cyprinidae: Cyprininae)

Scientific classification
- Kingdom: Animalia
- Phylum: Chordata
- Class: Actinopterygii
- Division: Teleostei
- (unranked): Otophysi
- Clade: Cypriniphysi
- Order: Cypriniformes; Goodrich, 1909

Type species
- Cyprinus carpio (Linnaeus, 1758)

Families
- see text

Diversity
- Around 4,205 species

= Cypriniformes =

Cypriniformes Temporal range: Late Cretaceous (Maastrichtian) to recent

Order of fishes

Cypriniformes /sɪˈprɪnɪfɔːrmiːz/ is an order of ray-finned fish which contains many sister families and genera of cypriniform fish split into several suborders, including the barbs, loaches, botias, carps, danionins, and minnows, amongst others. Cypriniformes is an "order-within-an-order", placed under the superorder Ostariophysi—which is also made up of cyprinid, ostariophysin fishes. The order contains 11–12 families (with some authorities having listed as many as 23), over 400 genera, and more than 4,250 named species; new species are regularly described, and new genera are recognized frequently. Cyprinids are most diverse in South and Southeast Asia and are entirely absent from Australia and South America. At 112 years old, the longest-lived cypriniform fish documented is the bigmouth buffalo.

Their closest living relatives are the Characiformes (characins, tetras and their kin), the Gymnotiformes (electric eel and American knifefishes), and the Siluriformes (catfishes).

== Description ==
Like other orders of the Ostariophysi, fishes of Cypriniformes possess a Weberian apparatus. They differ from most of their relatives in having only a dorsal fin on their backs; most other fishes of Ostariophysi have a small, fleshy adipose fin behind the dorsal fin. Other differences are the Cypriniformes' unique kinethmoid, a small median bone in the snout, and the lack of teeth in the mouth. Instead, they have convergent structures called pharyngeal teeth in the throat. While other groups of fish, such as cichlids, also possess pharyngeal teeth, the cypriniformes' teeth grind against a chewing pad on the base of the skull, rather than an upper pharyngeal jaw.

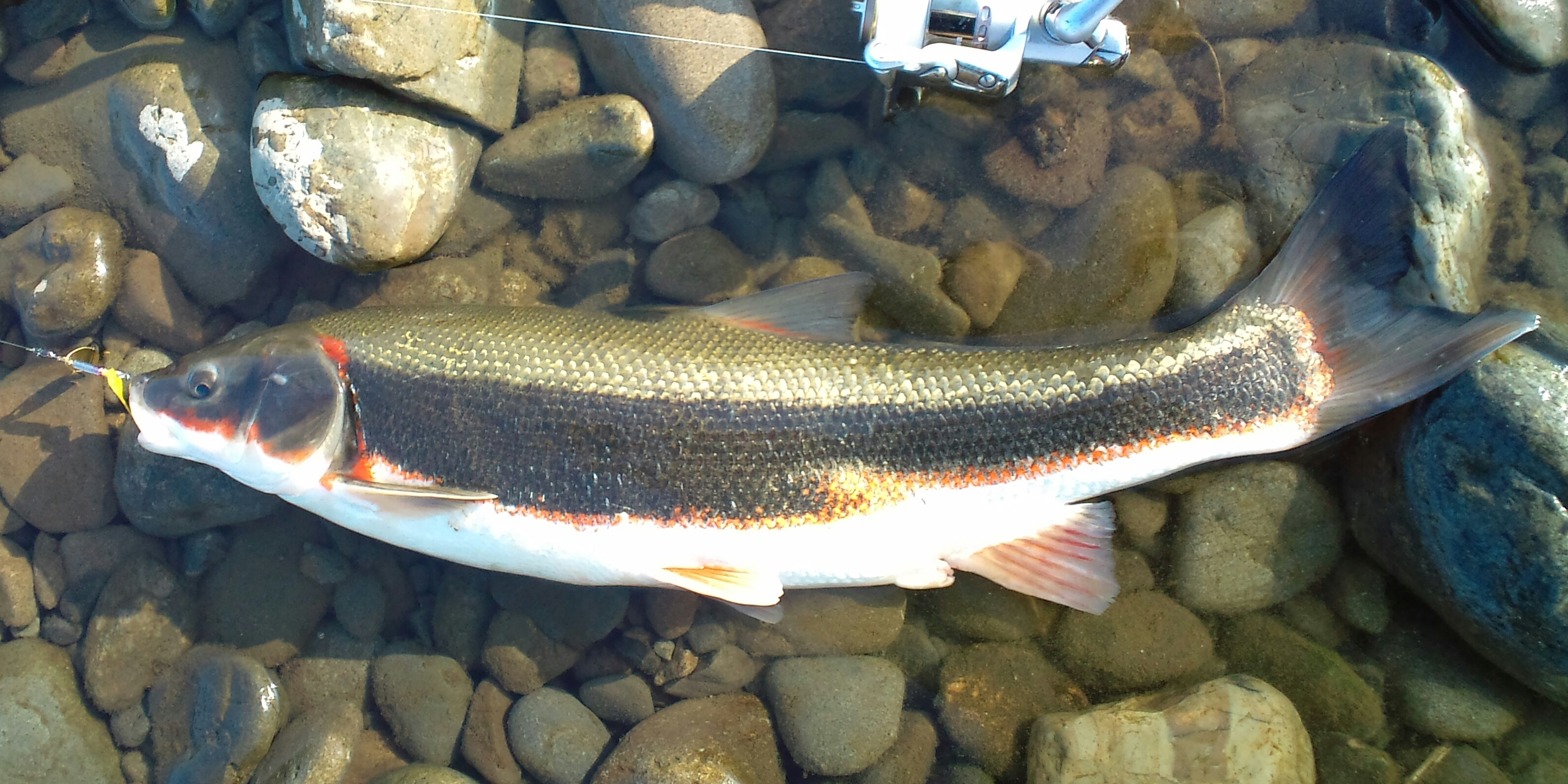
Pseudaspius brandtii, here seen in its freshwater spawning colours, is one of the few cypriniform species that can be found in saltwater.

The most notable family placed here is the Cyprinidae (carps and minnows), which make up two-thirds of the order's diversity. This is one of the largest families of fish, and is widely distributed across Eurasia, North America, and Africa. Most species are strictly freshwater inhabitants, but some are found in brackish water, such as roach and bream. At least one species is found in saltwater, the Pacific redfin (Pseudaspius brandtii). Brackish water and marine cyprinids are invariably anadromous, swimming upstream into rivers to spawn. Sometimes separated as family Psilorhynchidae, they seem to be specially adapted fishes of the Cyprinidae.

The Balitoridae and Gyrinocheilidae are families of mountain-stream fishes feeding on algae and small invertebrates. They are found only in tropical and subtropical Asia. While the former are a speciose group, the latter contain only a handful of species. The suckers (Catostomidae) are found in temperate North America and eastern Asia. These large fishes are similar to carps in appearance and ecology. Members of the Cobitidae are common across Eurasia and parts of North Africa. A midsized group like the suckers, they are rather similar to catfish in appearance and behaviour, feeding primarily off the substrate and equipped with barbels to help them locate food at night or in murky conditions. Fishes in the families Cobitidae, Balitoridae, Botiidae, and Gyrinocheilidae are called loaches, although the last do not seem to belong to the lineage of "true" loaches, but are related to the suckers.

== Systematics ==
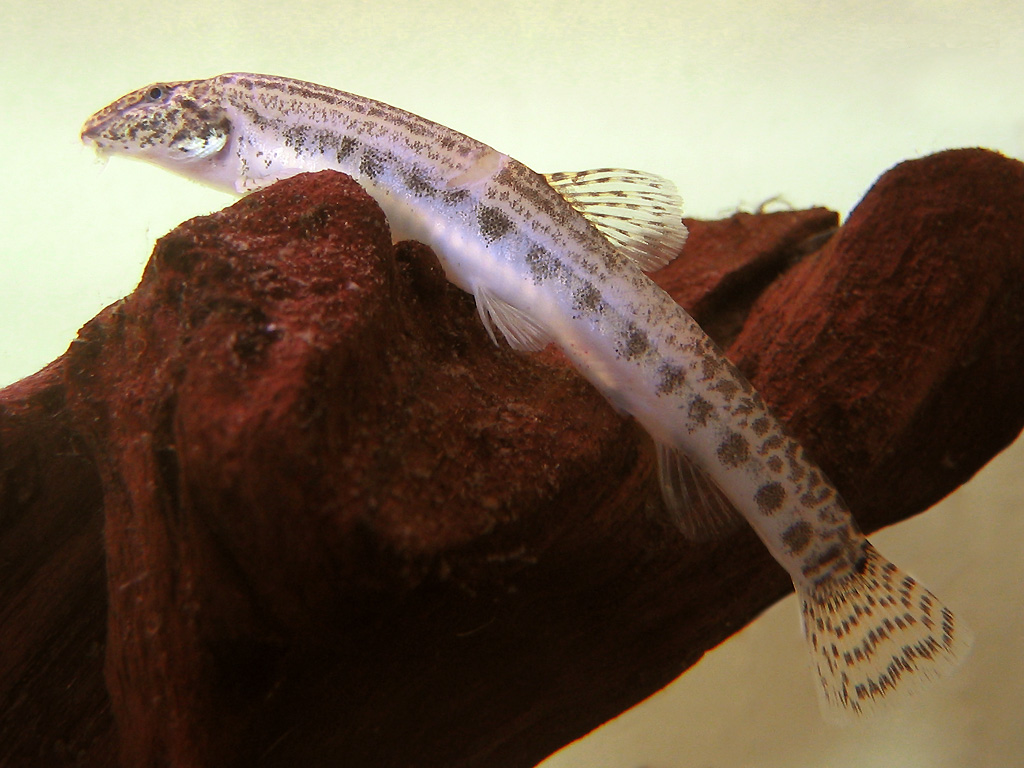
A true loach – the spined loach, Cobitis taenia

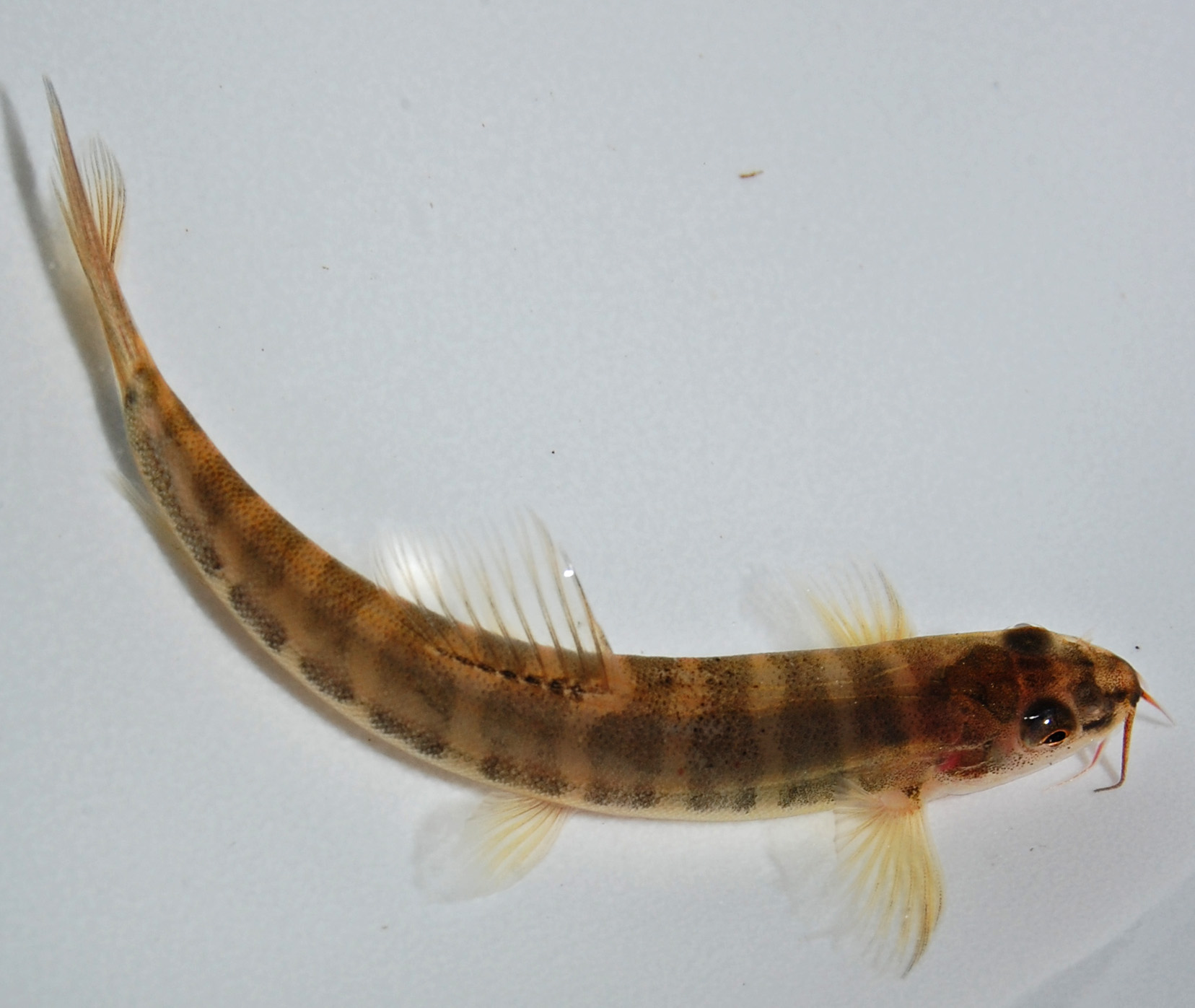
Nemacheilus chrysolaimos is a stone loach. Closely related to true loaches, like these, they have barbels.

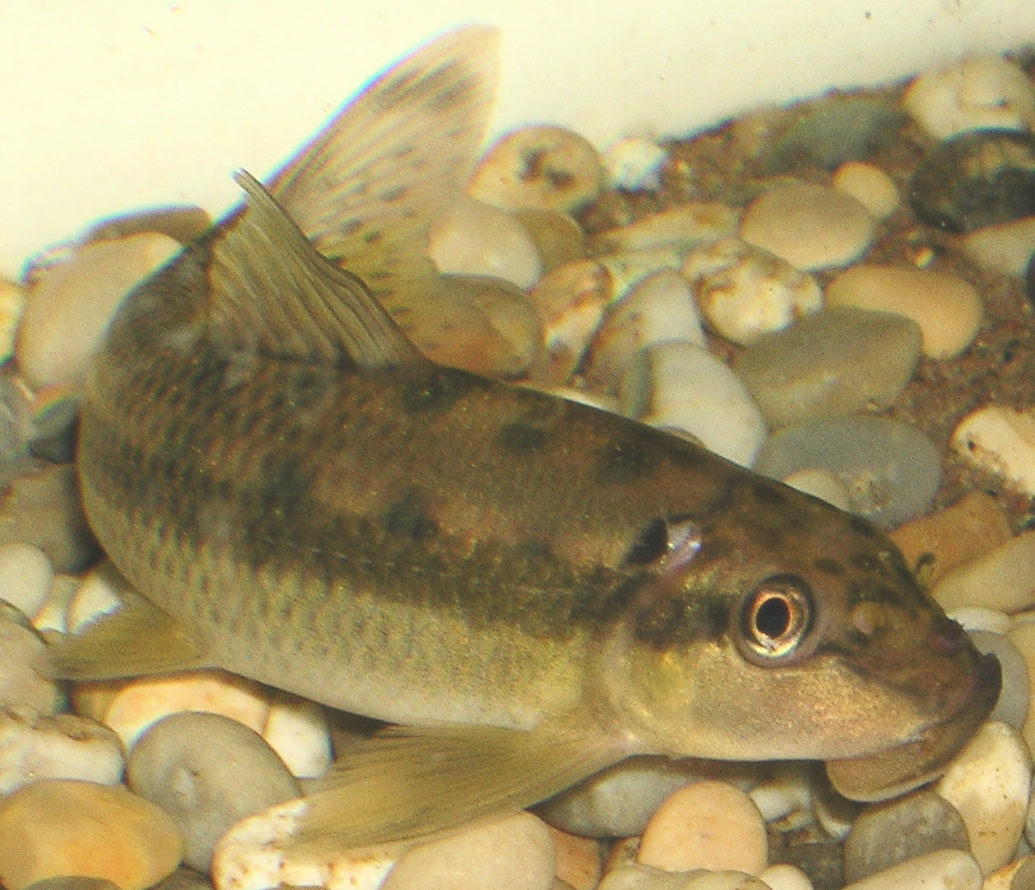
The Chinese algae eater (Gyrinocheilus aymonieri) is one of the sucking loaches, which are distant from other "loaches".

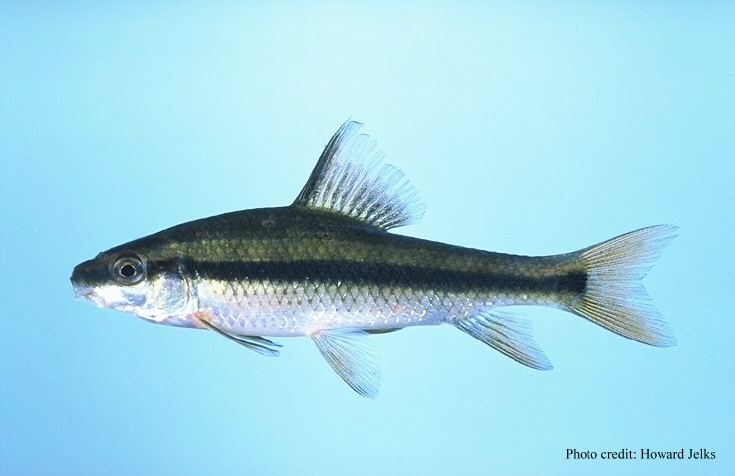
Erimyzon sucetta, a small sucker

Historically, these included all the forms now placed in the superorder Ostariophysi except the catfish, which were placed in the order Siluriformes. By this definition, the Cypriniformes were paraphyletic, so recently, the orders Gonorhynchiformes, Characiformes (characins and allies), and Gymnotiformes (knifefishes and electric eels) have been separated out to form their own monophyletic orders.

The families of Cypriniformes are traditionally divided into two suborders. Superfamily Cyprinioidea contains the carps and minnows (Cyprinidae) and also the mountain carps as the family Psilorhynchidae. In 2012, Maurice Kottelat reviewed the superfamily Cobitoidei and under his revision it now consists of the following families: hillstream loaches (Balitoridae), Barbuccidae, Botiidae, suckers (Catostomidae), true loaches (Cobitidae), Ellopostomatidae, Gastromyzontidae, sucking loaches (Gyrinocheilidae), stone loaches (Nemacheilidae), Serpenticobitidae, and long-finned loaches (Vaillantellidae).

Catostomoidea is usually treated as a junior synonym of the Cobitoidei, but it could be split off the Catostomidae and Gyrinocheilidae in a distinct superfamily; the Catostomoidea might be closer relatives of the carps and minnows than of the "true" loaches. While the Cyprinioidea seem more "primitive" than the loach-like forms, they were apparently successful enough never to shift from the original ecological niche of the basal Ostariophysi. Yet, from the ecomorphologically conservative main lineage apparently at least two major radiations branched off. These diversified from the lowlands into torrential river habitats, acquiring similar habitus and adaptations in the process.

The mountain carps are the highly apomorphic Cyprinidae, perhaps close to true carps (Cyprininae), or maybe to the danionins. While some details about the phylogenetic structures of this massively diverse family are known – e.g. that Cultrinae and Leuciscinae are rather close relatives and stand apart from Cyprininae – no good consensus exists yet on how the main lineages are interrelated. A systematic list, from the most ancient to the most modern lineages, can thus be given as:

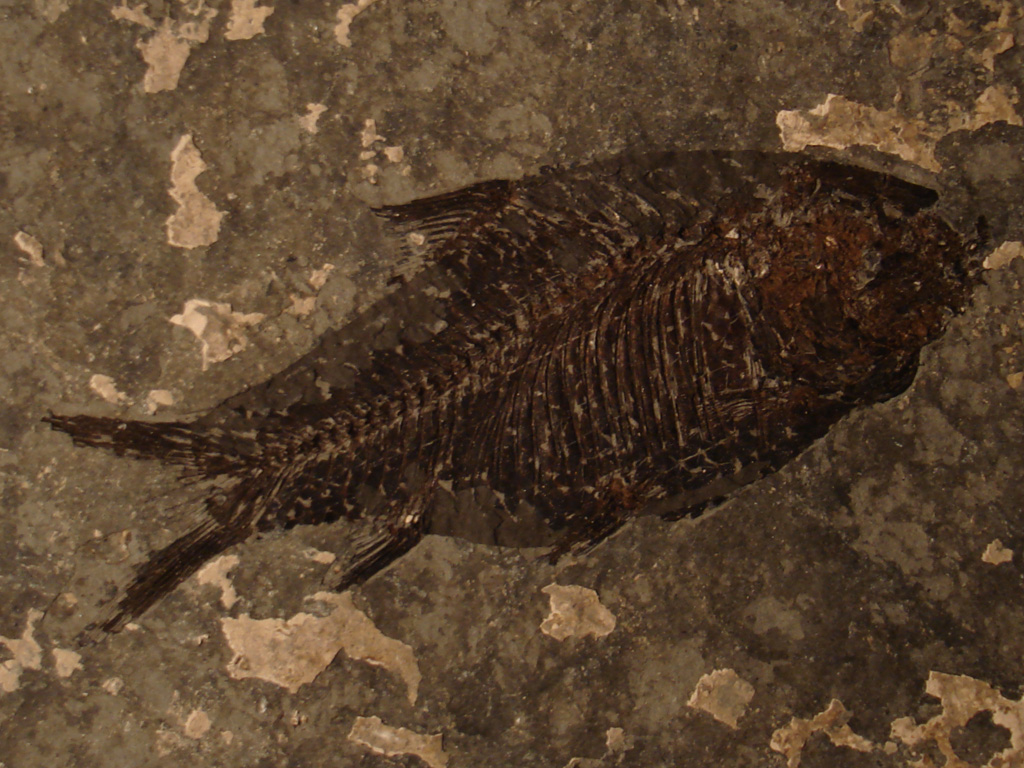
Fossil of Jianghanichthys, the earliest known cypriniform

- Family †Jianghanichthyidae Liu, Chang, Wilson & Murray, 2015 (Paleocene to Eocene of China)
- Suborder Gyrinocheiloidei Betancur-R, et al., 2017
  - Family Gyrinocheilidae Gill, 1907 (algae eaters)
- Suborder Catostomoidei Betancur-R, et al., 2017
  - Family Catostomidae Agassiz, 1850 (suckers)
- Suborder Cobitoidei Fitzinger, 1832
  - Family Botiidae Berg, 1940 (pointface loaches)
  - Family Vaillantellidae Nalbant & Bănărescu, 1977 (longfin loaches)
  - Family Cobitidae Swainson, 1838 (spined loaches)
  - Family Barbuccidae Kottelat, 2012 (scooter loaches)
  - Family Gastromyzontidae Fowler, 1905 (hillstream loaches)
  - Family Serpenticobitidae Kottelat, 2012 (snake loaches)
  - Family Balitoridae Swainson, 1839 (river loaches)
  - Family Ellopostomatidae Bohlen & Šlechtová, 2009 (square-head loaches)
  - Family Nemacheilidae Regan, 1911 (brook loaches)
- Suborder Cyprinoidei Fitzinger, 1832
  - Family Paedocyprididae Mayden & W.J. Chen, 2010 (tiny carps)
  - Family Psilorhynchidae Hora, 1926 (mountain carps)
  - Family Cyprinidae Rafinesque, 1815 (carps)
  - Family Sundadanionidae Mayden & Chen, 2010 (tiny danios)
  - Family Danionidae Bleeker, 1863 (danionids)
  - Family Leptobarbidae Bleeker, 1864 (cigar barbs)
  - Family Xenocyprididae Günther, 1868 (East Asian minnows or sharpbellies)
  - Family Tincidae D. S. Jordan, 1878 (tenches)
  - Family Acheilognathidae Bleeker, 1863 (bitterlings)
  - Family Gobionidae Bleeker, 1863 (freshwater gudgeons)
  - Family Tanichthyidae Mayden & Chen, 2010 (mountain minnows)
  - Family Leuciscidae Bonaparte, 1835 (minnows)

=== Phylogeny ===
A phylogenic analyses published by Hiranya Sudasinghe and coauthors in 2026 and the first phylogenic analysis of Cypriniformes including all families. Though they found confident placements within the other suborders, the exact placement a clade containing Cyprinidae and Psilorhynchidae differs slightly between the analyses. The phylogeny from the paper can be found below:

- Cypriniformes
  - - Gyrinocheiloidei
      Gyrinocheilidae
  - - - - Catostomoidei
          - Catostomidae
        - - - Cobitoidei
              - Botiidae
              - - Vaillantellidae
                - - Cobitidae
                  - - - Nemacheilidae
                      - Ellopostomatidae
                    - - - Serpenticobitidae
                        - Gastromyzontidae
                      - - - Barbuccidae
                          - Balitoridae
            - - - Cyprinoidei
                  - Paedocyprididae
                  - - - Sundadanionidae
                      - - - - Gobionidae
                            - - Tincidae
                              - Acheilognathidae
                          - - Tanichthyidae
                            - Leuciscidae
                    - - Danionidae
                      - - Psilorhynchidae
                        - - Cyprinidae

=== Evolution ===
Cypriniformes include the most primitive of the Ostariophysi in the narrow sense (i.e. excluding the Gonorynchiformes). This is evidenced not only by physiological details, but also by their great distribution, which indicates they had the longest time to spread. The earliest that Cypriniformes might have diverged from Characiphysi (Characiformes and relatives) is thought to be about the Early Triassic, about 250 million years ago (mya). However, their divergence probably occurred only with the splitting-up of Pangaea in the Jurassic, maybe 160 million years ago (Mya). By 110 Mya, the plate tectonics evidence indicates that the Laurasian Cypriniformes must have been distinct from their Gondwanan relatives.

The Cypriniformes are thought to have originated in South-east Asia, where the most diversity of this group is found today. The alternative hypothesis is that they began in South America, similar to the other otophysans. If this were the case, they would have spread to Asia through Africa or North America before the continents split up, for these are purely freshwater fishes. As the Characiformes began to diversify and spread, they may have outcompeted South American basal cypriniforms in Africa, where more advanced cypriniforms survive and coexist with characiforms.

Until 2025, no cypriniform fossil remains were known predating the Cenozoic. In 2025, multiple fossil remains of an indeterminate cypriniform, including jaws, tooth plates, and vertebrae, were identified from the early Maastrichtian-aged (71–69 Mya) Prince Creek Formation of Alaska. This occurrence suggests that in contrast to previous hypotheses, cypriniforms may have originated in high-latitude regions and radiated southwards during the Cenozoic. The next-oldest cypriniform fossils are already assignable to the living family Catostomidae; from the Paleocene-aged Paskapoo Formation of Alberta, they are roughly 60 million years old. During the Eocene (55–35 Mya), catostomids and cyprinids spread throughout Asia; the earliest members of the cyprinid subfamilies Barbinae and Danioninae are known from the Eocene Sangkarewang Formation of Indonesia, in addition to possibly Smilogastrinae and Labeoninae. The extinct family Jianghanichthyidae is known from the Eocene of China. In the Oligocene, around 30 Mya, advanced cyprinids began to outcompete catostomids wherever they were sympatric, causing a decline of the suckers. Cyprinids reached North America and Europe about the same time, and Africa in the early Miocene (some 23–20 Mya). The cypriniforms spread to North America through the Bering land bridge, which formed and disappeared again several times during the many millions of years of cypriniform evolution.

== Genomes ==
Haploid genome sizes for at least 261 species have been estimated and range from 753 to 2,510 Mb in size. Genome size within families is usually well conserved. Members of the loach (Cobitoidei) families have particularly small genomes (ca. 348 to 537 Mb) and they reach the size of some of the smallest fish genomes in the genera Fugu, Takifugu, and Tetraodon (ca. 346.5 to 385.0 Mb) in size.

== Relationship with humans ==
The Cyprinidae in particular are important in a variety of ways. Many species are important food fish, particularly in Europe and Asia. Some are also important as aquarium fish, of which the goldfish and koi are perhaps the most celebrated. The other families are of less commercial importance. The Catostomidae have some importance in angling, and some "loaches" are bred for the international aquarium fish trade.

Accidentally or deliberately introduced populations of common carp (Cyprinus carpio) and grass carp (Ctenopharyngodon idella) are found on all continents except Antarctica. In some cases, these exotic species have a negative impact on the environment. Carp in particular stir up the riverbed, reducing the clarity of the water, making plant growth difficult.

In science, one of the most famous members of the Cypriniformes is the zebrafish (Danio rerio). The zebrafish is one of the most important vertebrate model organisms in biological and biochemical sciences, being used in many kinds of experiments. During early development, the zebrafish has a nearly transparent body, so it is ideal for studying developmental biology. It is also used for the elucidation of biochemical signaling pathways. They are also good pets, but can be shy in bright light and crowded tanks.

=== Threats and extinction ===
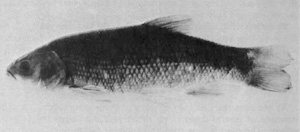
The thicktail chub (Gila crassicauda) is globally extinct since about 1960.

Habitat destruction, damming of upland rivers, pollution, and in some cases overfishing for food or the pet trade have driven some Cypriniformes to the brink of extinction or even beyond. In particular, Cyprinidae of southwestern North America have been severely affected; a considerable number went entirely extinct after settlement by Europeans. For example, in 1900 the thicktail chub (Gila crassicauda) was the most common freshwater fish found in California; 70 years later, not a single living individual existed.

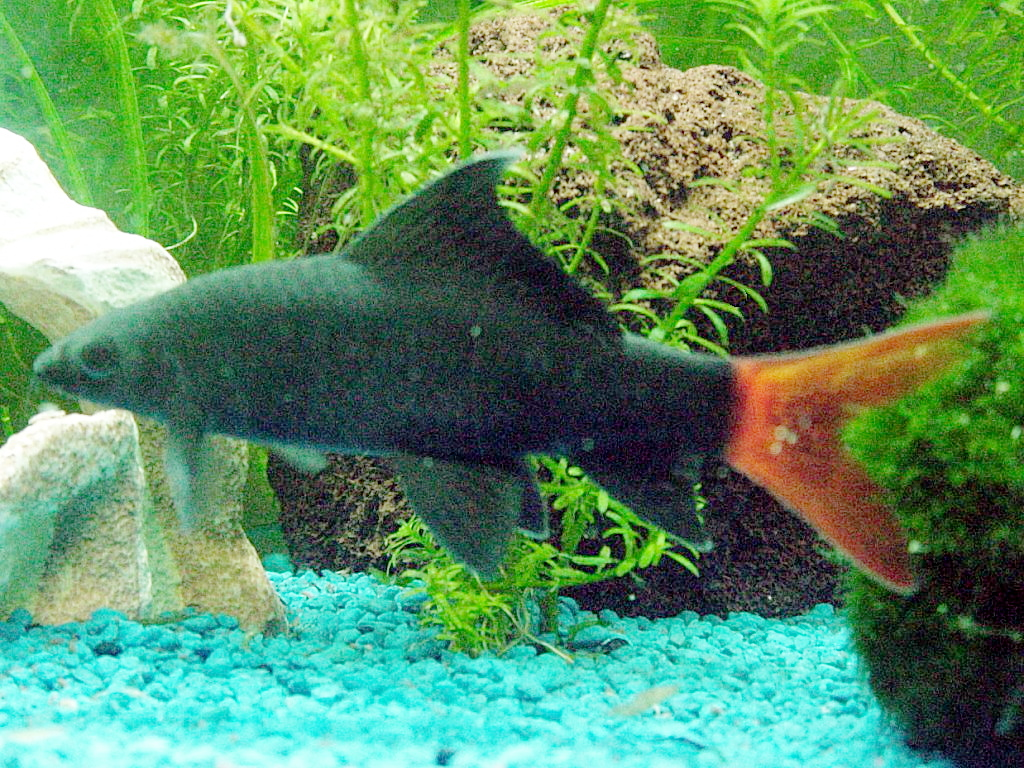
Few if any red-tailed black sharks (Epalzeorhynchos bicolor) remain in the wild today.

The well-known red-tailed black shark (Epalzeorhynchos bicolor) from the Mae Klong River of The Bridge on the River Kwai fame possibly only survives in captivity. Ironically, while pollution and other forms of overuse by humans have driven it from its native home, it is bred for the aquarium fish trade by the thousands. The Yarqon bleak (Acanthobrama telavivensis) from the Yarqon River had to be rescued into captivity from imminent extinction; new populations have apparently been established again successfully from captive stock. The Balitoridae and Cobitidae, meanwhile, contain a very large number of species about which essentially nothing is known except how they look and where they were first found.

Globally extinct Cypriniformes species are:

- Acanthobrama hulensis
- Gökçe balığı, Alburnus akili
- Barbus microbarbis
- Snake River sucker, Chasmistes muriei
- Chondrostoma scodrense
- Cyprinus yilongensis
- Mexican dace, Evarra bustamantei
- Plateau chub, Evarra eigenmanni
- Endorheic chub, Evarra tlahuacensis
- Thicktail chub, Gila crassicauda
- Pahranagat spinedace, Lepidomeda altivelis
- Harelip sucker, Moxostoma lacerum
- Durango shiner, Notropis aulidion
- Phantom shiner, Notropis orca
- Salado shiner, Notropis saladonis
- Clear Lake splittail, Pogonichthys ciscoides
- Las Vegas dace, Rhinichthys deaconi
- Stumptooth minnow, Stypodon signifer
- Telestes ukliva
