= Perote pocket gopher =

Cofre de Perote pocket gopher

Conservation status
- Least Concern (IUCN 3.1)

Scientific classification
- Kingdom: Animalia
- Phylum: Chordata
- Class: Mammalia
- Infraclass: Placentalia
- Order: Rodentia
- Family: Geomyidae
- Genus: Cratogeomys
- Species: C. perotensis

Binomial name
- Cratogeomys perotensis Merriam, 1895
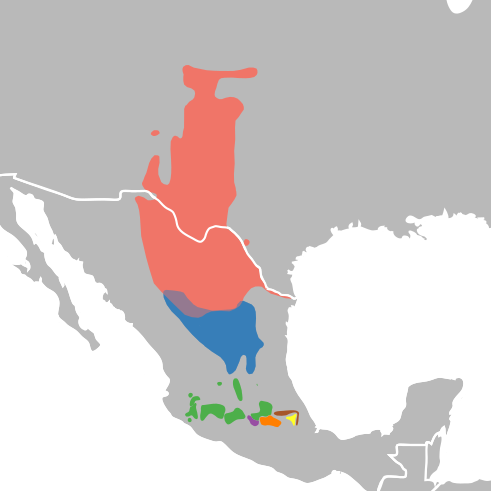
- Cratogeomys distribution C. perotensis in brown

Species of rodent

The Perote pocket gopher (Cratogeomys perotensis), or Cofre de Perote pocket gopher, is a species of pocket gopher in the family Geomyidae.

== Range ==
Endemic to Mexico, it is found in the mountains from southern Hidalgo south through Puebla and Veracruz to the volcanic edifices of Cofre de Perote and Pico de Orizaba, the former being the type locality.

== Description ==
This rodent is light to dark brown in color and weighs 400 to 650 g, with males being slightly larger. There are usually small white areas near the base of the tail. Its karyotype has 2n = 38 and FN = 72.

== Habitat ==
It inhabits Zacatonal grassland and temperate pine-oak woodlands at elevations from 2400 to 4000 m.

== Taxonomic history ==
Initially described as a species in 1895, C. perotensis was demoted to a subspecies of C. merriami in 1968. In 2005 it was split off again when found to be distinct in molecular, chromosomal and morphological characters. It subsumes the previously proposed taxa C. estor (Merriam, 1895), C. merriami irolonis (Nelson and Goldman, 1934), C. irolonis (Davis, 1944), and C. merriami peraltus (Goldman, 1937), and is part of the C. castanops species group.

== Conservation status ==
Although it occupies an area of less than 20,000 km^{2}, C. perotensis is thought to be common and is not considered threatened.
