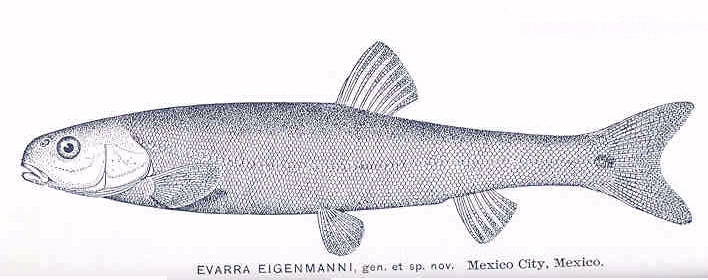

Conservation status
- Extinct (IUCN 3.1)

Scientific classification
- Kingdom: Animalia
- Phylum: Chordata
- Class: Actinopterygii
- Division: Teleostei
- Order: Cypriniformes
- Family: Leuciscidae
- Genus: †Evarra
- Species: †E. eigenmanni

Binomial name
- †Evarra eigenmanni Woolman, 1894

= Plateau chub =

Extinct species of fish

The plateau chub (Evarra eigenmanni) is an extinct species of ray-finned fish in the family Leuciscidae. It was found only in Mexico.
