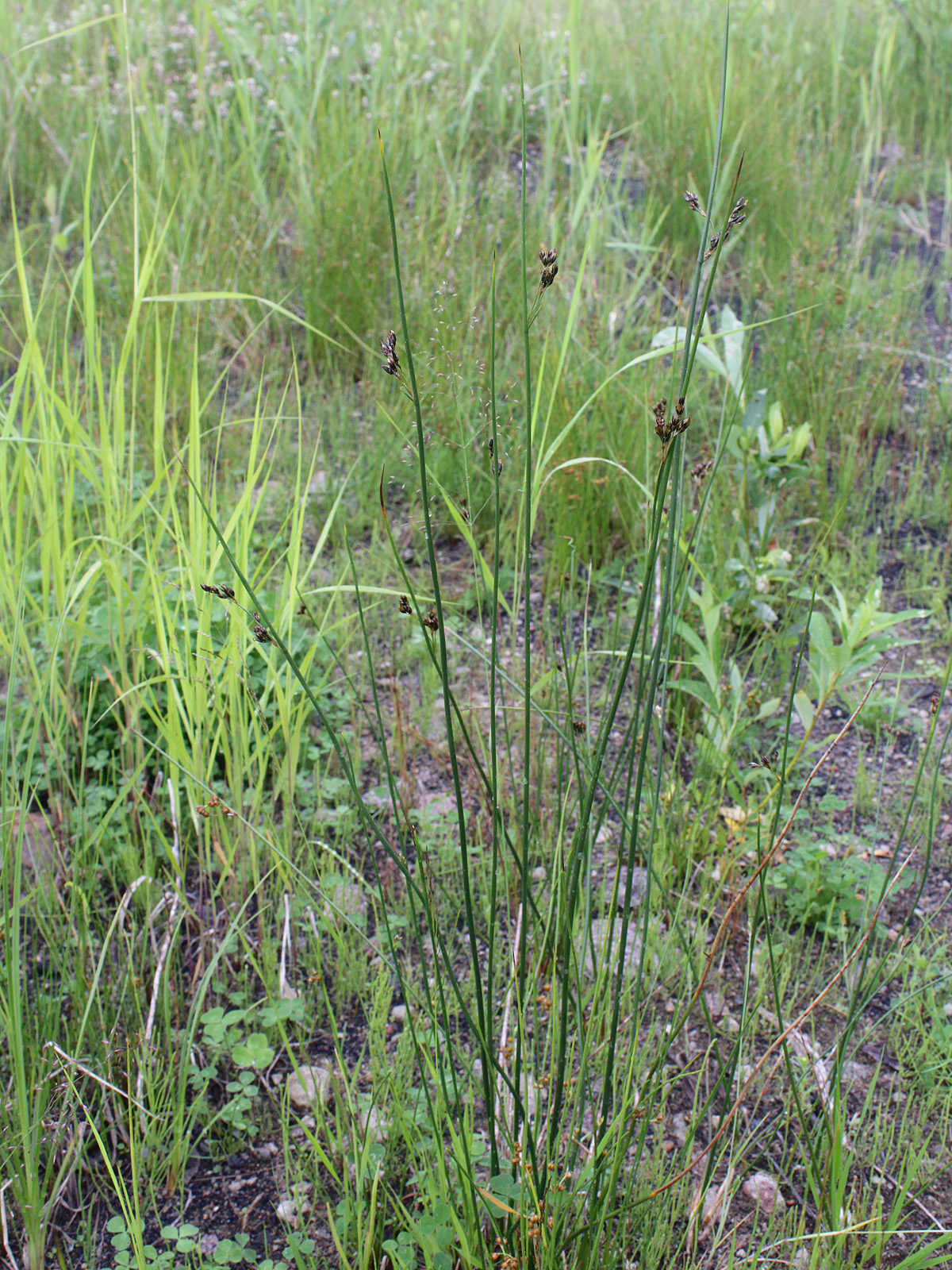

Scientific classification
- Kingdom: Plantae
- Clade: Embryophytes
- Clade: Tracheophytes
- Clade: Spermatophytes
- Clade: Angiosperms
- Clade: Monocots
- Clade: Commelinids
- Order: Poales
- Family: Juncaceae
- Genus: Juncus
- Species: J. balticus

Binomial name
- Juncus balticus Willd.

Synonyms
- Juncus arcticus subsp. balticus (Willd.) Hyl.; Juncus arcticus var. balticus (Willd.) Trautv.; Juncus balticus f. contractus Neuman; Juncus balticus f. laxior Neuman; Juncus balticus var. lesueurii Gelert; Juncus balticus var. tenuis H.Linb.; Juncus balticus subsp. vallicola (Rydb.) Lint; Juncus glaucus var. littoralis Wahlenb.

= Juncus balticus =

Baltic rush

Species of flowering plant in the rush family

Juncus balticus is a species of rush known by the common name Baltic rush. It is a perennial flowering plant in the family Juncaceae. It can reach a height of about 75 centimetres (29 1/2 inches). It is native to north-western Europe from Spain to northern European Russia, most of North America except the south-eastern United States, parts of Mexico and Central America, and western and southern South America from Colombia to Argentina. It is available from specialist nurseries for landscaping and soil stabilization purposes.

== Subspecies ==
As of March 2024, Plants of the World Online accepted seven subspecies:

- Juncus balticus subsp. andicola (Hook.) Snogerup
- Juncus balticus subsp. ater (Rydb.) Snogerup
- Juncus balticus subsp. balticus
- Juncus balticus subsp. cantabricus (T.E.Díaz, Fern.-Carv. & Fern.Prieto) Snogerup
- Juncus balticus subsp. littoralis (Engelm.) Snogerup
- Juncus balticus subsp. mexicanus (Willd. ex Schult. & Schult.f.) Snogerup (syn. Juncus mexicanus)
- Juncus balticus subsp. pyrenaeus (Timb.-Lagr. & Jeanb.) P.Fourn.

== See also ==
- Crown of thorns

== Bibliography ==
- C.Michael Hogan, ed. 2010. Juncus balticus. Encyclopedia of Life.
