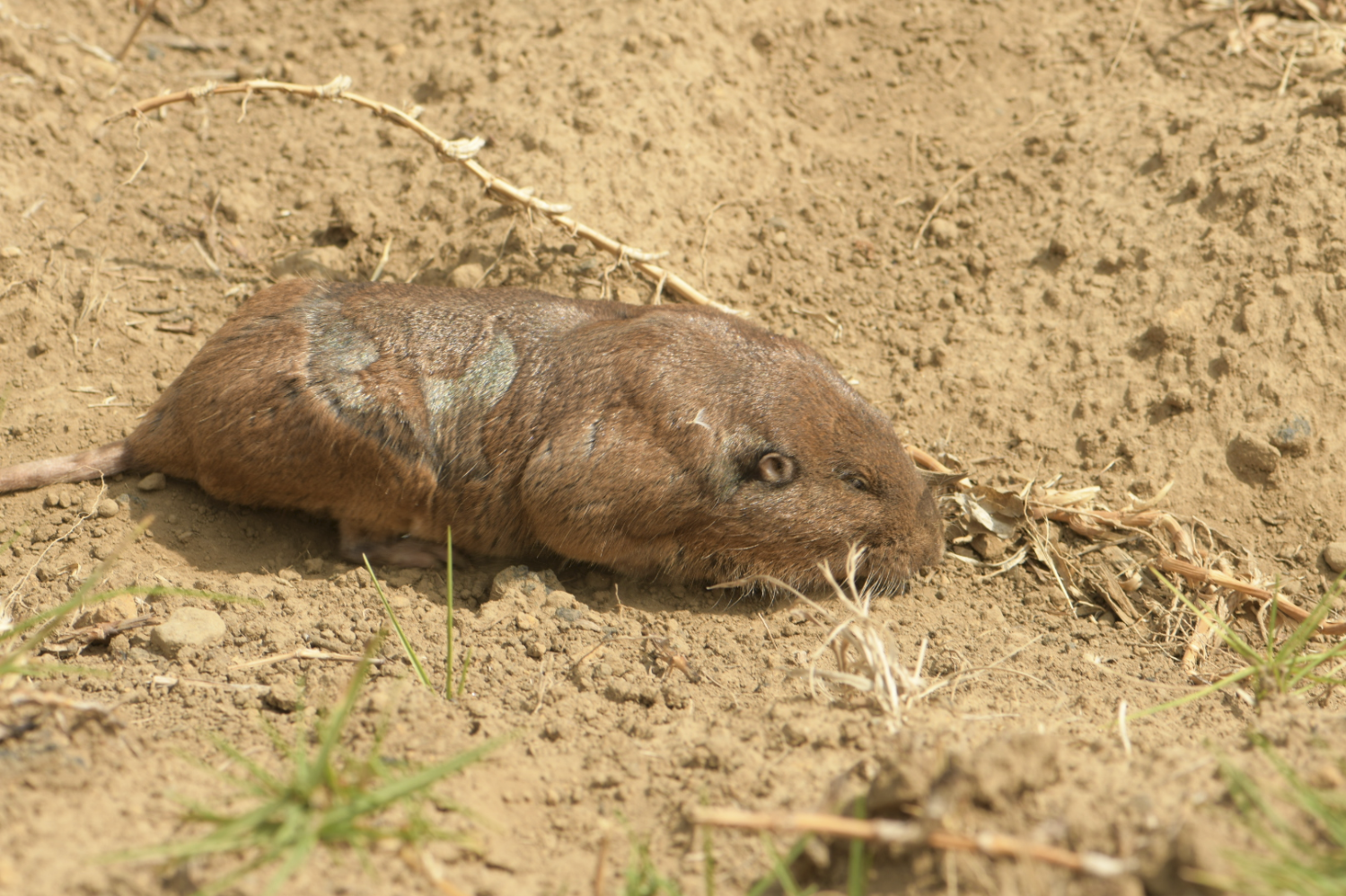

Conservation status
- Least Concern (IUCN 3.1)

Scientific classification
- Kingdom: Animalia
- Phylum: Chordata
- Class: Mammalia
- Order: Rodentia
- Family: Geomyidae
- Genus: Cratogeomys
- Species: C. merriami

Binomial name
- Cratogeomys merriami (Thomas, 1893)
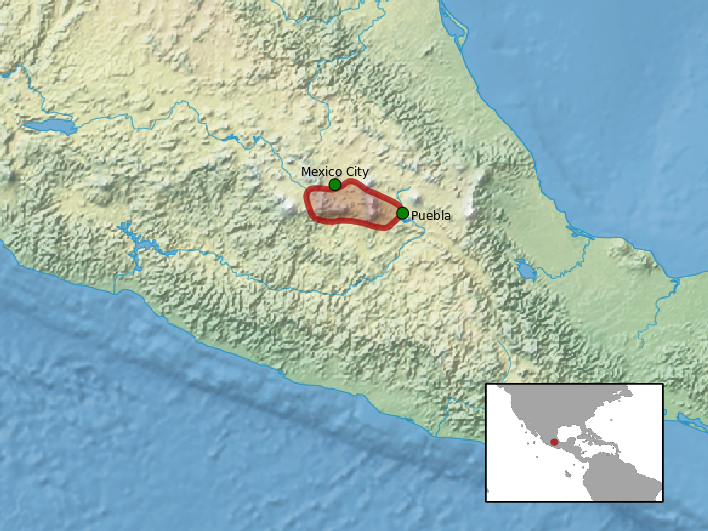
- Range

Synonyms
- Pappogeomys merriami

= Merriam's pocket gopher =

Species of rodent

Merriam's pocket gopher (Cratogeomys merriami) is a species of rodent in the family Geomyidae. It is endemic to Mexico, where it is found in the area of the Valley of Mexico and the Valley of Toluca at elevations from 1800 to 4000 m. Its favored habitats are the Zacatonal grassland and temperate pine-oak woodlands, as well as farmland and rangeland. Its karyotype has 2n = 36 and FN = 68.

Until 2005, what are now considered the separate species C. fulvescens and C. perotensis were included within this taxon. They were split off due to clear molecular, chromosomal and morphological differences. All three species are part of the C. castanops species group.

The species is named after American mammalogist Clinton Hart Merriam.

Although its distribution is patchy, it is not thought to be threatened.
