= Gastromyzon danumensis =

Scientific classification
- Domain: Eukaryota
- Kingdom: Animalia
- Phylum: Chordata
- Class: Actinopterygii
- Order: Cypriniformes
- Family: Gastromyzontidae
- Genus: Gastromyzon
- Species: G. danumensis

Binomial name
- Gastromyzon danumensis P. K. Chin & Inger, 1989

Species of fish

Gastromyzon danumensis is a species of ray-finned fish in the genus Gastromyzon.

== Footnotes ==
- Froese, Rainer; Pauly, Daniel (eds.). "Gastromyzon danumensis". FishBase.
