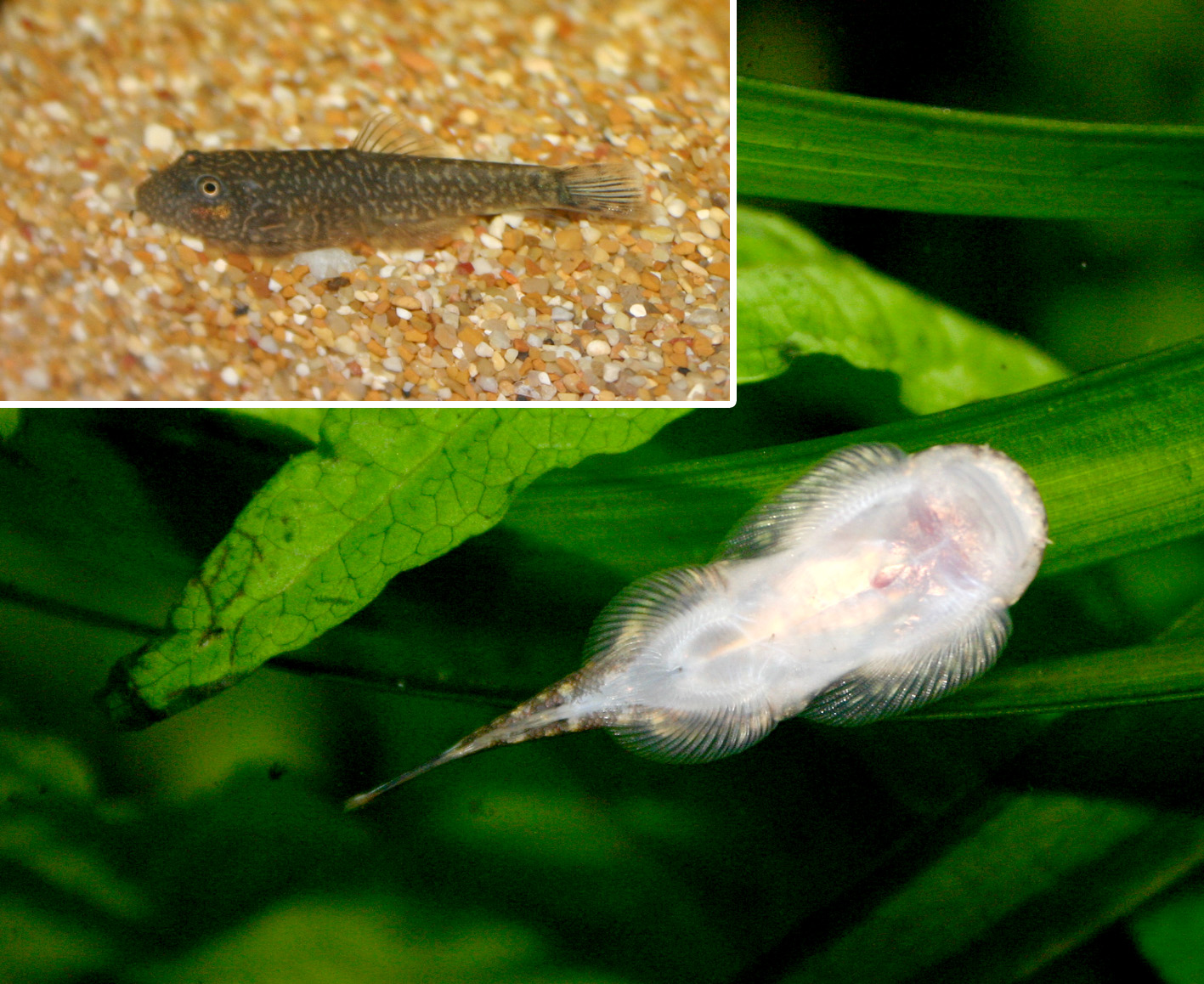

Scientific classification
- Domain: Eukaryota
- Kingdom: Animalia
- Phylum: Chordata
- Class: Actinopterygii
- Order: Cypriniformes
- Family: Gastromyzontidae
- Genus: Gastromyzon
- Species: G. fasciatus

Binomial name
- Gastromyzon fasciatus Inger & P. K. Chin, 1961

= Gastromyzon fasciatus =

Species of fish

Gastromyzon fasciatus is a species of ray-finned fish in the genus Gastromyzon.

== Footnotes ==
- Froese, Rainer; Pauly, Daniel (eds.). "Gastromyzon fasciatus". FishBase.
