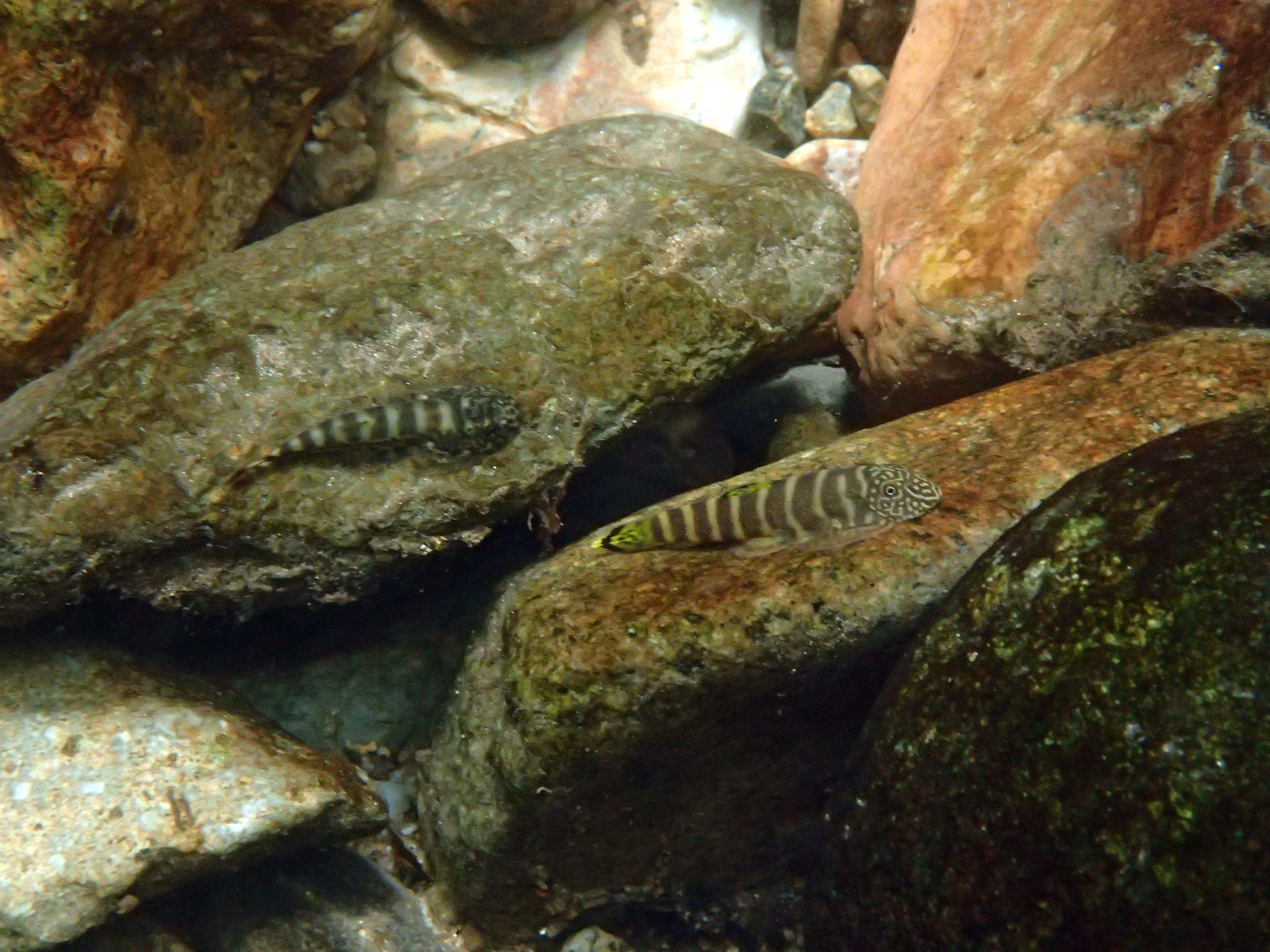

Scientific classification
- Kingdom: Animalia
- Phylum: Chordata
- Class: Actinopterygii
- Order: Cypriniformes
- Family: Gastromyzontidae
- Genus: Gastromyzon
- Species: G. viriosus

Binomial name
- Gastromyzon viriosus H. H. Tan, 2006

= Gastromyzon viriosus =

Species of fish

Gastromyzon viriosus is a species of ray-finned fish in the genus Gastromyzon.

== Footnotes ==
- Froese, Rainer; Pauly, Daniel (eds.). "Gastromyzon viriosus". FishBase.
