= Gastromyzon introrsus =

Scientific classification
- Kingdom: Animalia
- Phylum: Chordata
- Class: Actinopterygii
- Order: Cypriniformes
- Family: Gastromyzontidae
- Genus: Gastromyzon
- Species: G. introrsus

Binomial name
- Gastromyzon introrsus H. H. Tan, 2006

Species of fish

Gastromyzon introrsus is a species of ray-finned fish in the genus Gastromyzon.

== Footnotes ==
- Froese, Rainer; Pauly, Daniel (eds.). "Gastromyzon introrsus". FishBase.
