= Zohrah Sulaiman =

Bruneian researcher and educator

Datin Paduka Zohrah Sulaiman DPMB SNB PIKB
- ذوهرح سليمان
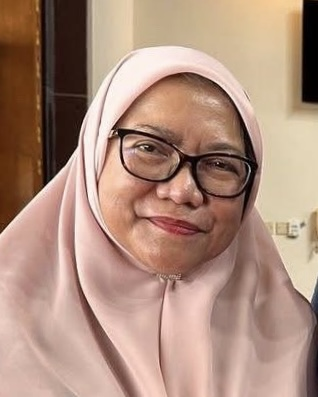
- Zohrah in 2023
- Born: Brunei
- Education: University of Wales Institute of Science and Technology (BSc); University of Reading (MSc); University of Southampton (PhD
- Occupations: Professor; ichthyologist
- Scientific career
- Known for: Discovery of the fish species Gastromyzon venustus, Gastromyzon aeroides, and Gastromyzon cranbrooki
- Fields: Biodiversity, aquaculture, molecular phylogeny, and biogeography of fishes
- Workplaces: Universiti Brunei Darussalam; Universiti Teknologi Brunei
- Thesis: The Fate of injected DNA in tilapia (Oreochromis niloticus) (1994)

Zohrah binti Haji Sulaiman is a Bruneian ichthyologist and professor, currently serving as the vice-chancellor of Universiti Teknologi Brunei (UTB). In 2006, she discovered three new species of Gastromyzon fish in the Temburong River: Gastromyzon aeroides, Gastromyzon cranbrooki, and Gastromyzon venustus. Her research focuses on molecular genetics and biodiversity, with significant contributions to ichthyology, including the identification of new fish and mussel species. Additionally, she holds patents related to biodiesel production from local paddy varieties.

== Early life and education ==
In 1987, Zohrah graduated with a BSc Tech (Hons) in applied biology from the University of Wales Institute of Science and Technology in Cardiff. She then graduated in 1988 with an MSc in food science from the University of Reading. Later, in 1994, she received a PhD in genetics from the University of Southampton.

== Career ==
In 1988, she started working as a school teacher, and in 1989, she enrolled in Universiti Brunei Darussalam (UBD). After that, became Deputy Vice-Chancellor at UBD. In 2013, she moved to UTB, where she was named Vice-Chancellor in 2015. She is the recipient of the ASEAN Science and Technology Meritorious Service Medal and the ASAIHL Fellowship.

In 2006, she discovered three new species of Gastromyzon fish in the Temburong River alongside her colleagues from the National University of Singapore: Gastromyzon aeroides, Gastromyzon cranbrooki, and Gastromyzon venustus. She and her colleagues made the discovery of new freshwater mussels in Borneo in 2021.

She and her PhD student jointly held two patents related to the manufacturing of biodiesel from the local paddy known as "Laila." From 1994 to 2013, she was a genetics, population, and molecular genetics instructor at UBD. She was named an Honorary Professor at the College of Science at Swansea University from 2018 to 2023, an adjunct professor at UBD from 2020 to 2022, and an instructor of biology in the School of Applied Sciences and Mathematics, UTB since 29 October 2020.

A MoU was signed by UTB Vice-Chancellor Zohrah, Brunei Shell Petroleum, and Shell Deepwater Borneo on 3 December 2020, with the aim of advancing artificial intelligence collaboration under the "AI: Gift to Nation." In order to improve student exchanges, academic partnerships, and cybersecurity measures in Brunei, UTB and ITPSS signed a MoU on 20 March 2023, with her playing a significant role in the signing. In her capacity as deputy chairperson, she welcomed a group from the Konsortium Universiti Universitas Borneo (KUUB) on 23 January 2024, to talk about upcoming joint initiatives that supports talent development, innovation, and education among Borneo universities.

== Selected works ==
- Hj Shahdan, Hj Ramlee (2005). Buku panduan kehidupan liar haiwan akuatik di Tasek Merimbun: A guide book to wild aquatic fauna of Tasek Merimbun. Bandar Seri Begawan: Brunei Museum Department. p. 51. ISBN 9991730273.
- Tan, Heok Hui (2006). "Three new species of gastromyzon (Teleostei: Balitoridae) from the Temburong River Basin, Brunei Darusssalam, Borneo". Zootaxa. 1117: 1–19. doi:10.11646/zootaxa.1117.1.1.
- Sulaiman, Zohrah; Peter Kee Lin Ng; et al. (2006). "Mitochondrial DNA sequence analyses in Bornean sucker fishes (Balitoridae: Teleostei: Gastromyzontinae)". Integrative Zoology. 1 (1): 12–14. doi:10.1111/j.1749-4877.2006.00005.x. PMID 21395984.
- Chan, Raymond Ho Ming; Simanjuntak, Putri Maharani (1998). Gene expression in black tiger prawns following intramuscular injection of B-GAL plasmid. Bandar Seri Begawan: Universiti Brunei Darussalam. p. 14.
- Ahasan Habib (2016). "Phylogenetic and morphometric relationships between twospecies of genus Auxis from the South China Sea and Java Sea". Oceanologica Acta. 35 (10): 76–82. Bibcode:2016AcOSn..35...76H. doi:10.1007/s13131-016-0915-9.
- Ahasan Habib (2016). "High genetic connectivity of narrow-barred Spanish mackerel (Scomberomorus commerson) from the South China, Bali and Java Seas". Zoology and Ecology. 26 (2): 93–99. Bibcode:2016ZooEc..26...93H. doi:10.1080/21658005.2016.1161121.
- Kumar, Prabitha vinodh (2016). "Use of synthetic fusion gene to produce biodiesel from lignocellulosic biomass". Biofuels. 7 (2): 191–200. Bibcode:2016Biofu...7..191K. doi:10.1080/17597269.2015.1123984.
- Baker, Kate; Chadwick, Michael A.; et al. (2016). "Eco-hydromorphic Classification for Understanding Stream Macroinvertebrate Biodiversity in Brunei Darussalam, Northern Borneo". Zoological Studies. 55 (37) e37. doi:10.6620/ZS.2016.55-37. PMC 6511898. PMID 31966182.
- Baker, Kate; Chadwick, Michael; et al. (2016). "Fluvial biotopes influence macroinvertebrate biodiversity in South-East Asian tropical streams". Ecosphere. 7 (12) e01479. Bibcode:2016Ecosp...7E1479B. doi:10.1002/ecs2.1479. hdl:10871/37920.
- Ahasan Habib (2017). "Mitochondrial DNA analyses of narrow-barred Spanish mackerel (Scomberomorus commerson) sampled from the Arabian Sea, the Bay of Bengal, and the Indo-Malay archipelago". Zoology and Ecology. 26 (4): 245–250. Bibcode:2017ZooEc..27..245H. doi:10.1080/21658005.2017.1385990. eISSN 2165-8013. ISSN 2165-8005.
- Polgar, Gianluca; Zaccara, Serena; et al. (2017). "Habitat segregation and cryptic adaptation of species of Periophthalmus (Gobioidei: Gobiidae)". Journal of Fish Biology. 90 (5): 1926–1943. Bibcode:2017JFBio..90.1926P. doi:10.1111/jfb.13276. PMID 28239874.
- Tan, Heok Hui; Lim, Kelvin Kok Peng (2018). "Annotated checklist of freshwater fishes from Brunei Darussalam, Borneo". Zootaxa. 4379 (1): 24–46. doi:10.11646/zootaxa.4379.1.2. eISSN 1175-5334. ISSN 1175-5326. PMID 29689972.
- Zieritz, Alexandra; et al. (Zieritz et al.) (2020). Towards the conservation of Borneo's freshwater mussels: rediscovery of the endemic Ctenodesma borneensis and first record of the non-native Sinanodonta lauta. pp. 2235–2253.
- Zieritz, Alexandra; et al. (Zieritz et al.) (2021). A new genus and two new, rare freshwater mussel (Bivalvia:Unionidae) species endemic to Borneo are threatened byongoing habitat destruction. Wiley. p. 14. doi:10.1007/s10531-020-01971-1.
- Lim, Mei-Ann; Taha, Hussein (June 2021). "Genetic structure of selected finfish populations in the Galapagos Islands, Ecuador". Marine Biodiversity. 51 (3) 41. Bibcode:2021MarBd..51...41S. doi:10.1007/s12526-021-01179-8.

== Personal life ==
Zohrah is married to Kassim bin Haji Daud, and they have a son together.

== Honours ==
Zohrah has earned the following honours;

- Order of Seri Paduka Mahkota Brunei Second Class (DPMB; 15 July 2022) – Datin Paduka
- Order of Seri Paduka Mahkota Brunei Third Class (SMB; 24 July 2011)
- Order of Setia Negara Brunei Third Class (SNB; 15 July 2017)
- Order of Setia Negara Brunei Fourth Class (PSB; 1 August 2006)
- Excellent Service Medal (PIKB; 2001)
