= Gastromyzon ocellatus =

Scientific classification
- Kingdom: Animalia
- Phylum: Chordata
- Class: Actinopterygii
- Order: Cypriniformes
- Family: Gastromyzontidae
- Genus: Gastromyzon
- Species: G. ocellatus

Binomial name
- Gastromyzon ocellatus H. H. Tan & P. K. L. Ng, 2004

Species of fish

Gastromyzon ocellatus is a species of ray-finned fish in the genus Gastromyzon.

== Footnotes ==
- Froese, Rainer; Pauly, Daniel (eds.). "Gastromyzon ocellatus". FishBase.
