= Gastromyzon crenastus =

Scientific classification
- Kingdom: Animalia
- Phylum: Chordata
- Class: Actinopterygii
- Order: Cypriniformes
- Family: Gastromyzontidae
- Genus: Gastromyzon
- Species: G. crenastus

Binomial name
- Gastromyzon crenastus H. H. Tan & M. U. C. Leh, 2006

Species of fish

Gastromyzon crenastus is a species of ray-finned fish in the genus Gastromyzon.

== Footnotes ==
- Froese, Rainer; Pauly, Daniel (eds.). "Gastromyzon crenastus". FishBase.
