= Gastromyzon stellatus =

Scientific classification
- Kingdom: Animalia
- Phylum: Chordata
- Class: Actinopterygii
- Order: Cypriniformes
- Family: Gastromyzontidae
- Genus: Gastromyzon
- Species: G. stellatus

Binomial name
- Gastromyzon stellatus H. H. Tan, 2006

Species of fish

Gastromyzon stellatus is a species of ray-finned fish in the genus Gastromyzon. Also known as a loach.

In a home aquarium, the fish need excellent water-flow and aeration as well as rocky hiding places. Lighting should be bright to encourage algal growth in the aquarium but plants are unnecessary. An aquarium with base dimensions of 75 ∗ 30 cm is large enough to house a group. A tight lid is important because the species can climb glass.

== Footnotes ==
- Froese, Rainer; Pauly, Daniel (eds.). "Gastromyzon stellatus". FishBase.
