= Gastromyzon pariclavis =

Scientific classification
- Kingdom: Animalia
- Phylum: Chordata
- Class: Actinopterygii
- Order: Cypriniformes
- Family: Gastromyzontidae
- Genus: Gastromyzon
- Species: G. pariclavis

Binomial name
- Gastromyzon pariclavis H. H. Tan & Martin-Smith, 1998

Species of fish

Gastromyzon pariclavis is a species of ray-finned fish in the genus Gastromyzon.

== Footnotes ==
- Froese, Rainer; Pauly, Daniel (eds.). "Gastromyzon pariclavis". FishBase.
