= Gastromyzon aequabilis =

Scientific classification
- Kingdom: Animalia
- Phylum: Chordata
- Class: Actinopterygii
- Order: Cypriniformes
- Family: Gastromyzontidae
- Genus: Gastromyzon
- Species: G. aequabilis

Binomial name
- Gastromyzon aequabilis H. H. Tan, 2006

Species of fish

Gastromyzon aequabilis is a species of ray-finned fish in the genus Gastromyzon. It is endemic to the Kuamut drainage of the Kinabatangan River in Malaysia.

== Footnotes ==
- Froese, Rainer; Pauly, Daniel (eds.). "Gastromyzon aequabilis". FishBase.
