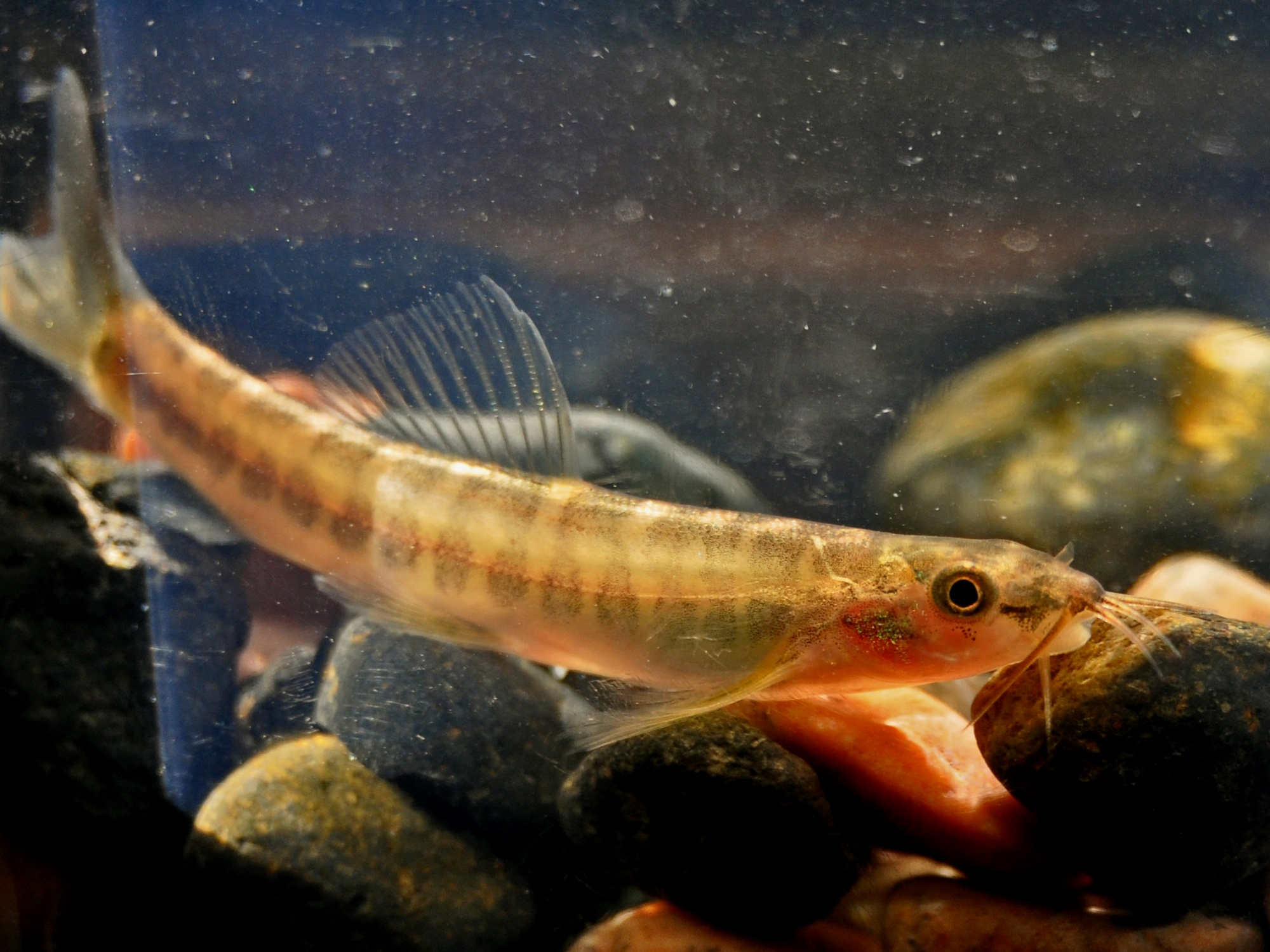
- Nemacheilus chrysolaimos, from Bogor, West Java

Scientific classification
- Kingdom: Animalia
- Phylum: Chordata
- Class: Actinopterygii
- Order: Cypriniformes
- Family: Nemacheilidae
- Genus: Nemacheilus
- Species: N. chrysolaimos

Binomial name
- Nemacheilus chrysolaimos (Valenciennes, 1846)

= Nemacheilus chrysolaimos =

Species of fish

Nemacheilus chrysolaimos is a species of ray-finned fish in the genus Nemacheilus.

== Footnotes ==
Media related to Nemacheilus chrysolaimos at Wikimedia Commons

- Froese, Rainer; Pauly, Daniel (eds.). "Nemacheilus chrysolaimos". FishBase.
