= Nemacheilus cleopatra =

Conservation status
- Least Concern (IUCN 3.1)

Scientific classification
- Kingdom: Animalia
- Phylum: Chordata
- Class: Actinopterygii
- Order: Cypriniformes
- Family: Nemacheilidae
- Genus: Nemacheilus
- Species: N. cleopatra

Binomial name
- Nemacheilus cleopatra Freyhof & Serov, 2001

Species of fish

Nemacheilus cleopatra is a species of ray-finned fish in the genus Nemacheilus which is known only from the Đà Rằng River in central Vietnam.

== Footnotes ==
- Froese, Rainer; Pauly, Daniel (eds.). "Nemacheilus cleopatra". FishBase.
