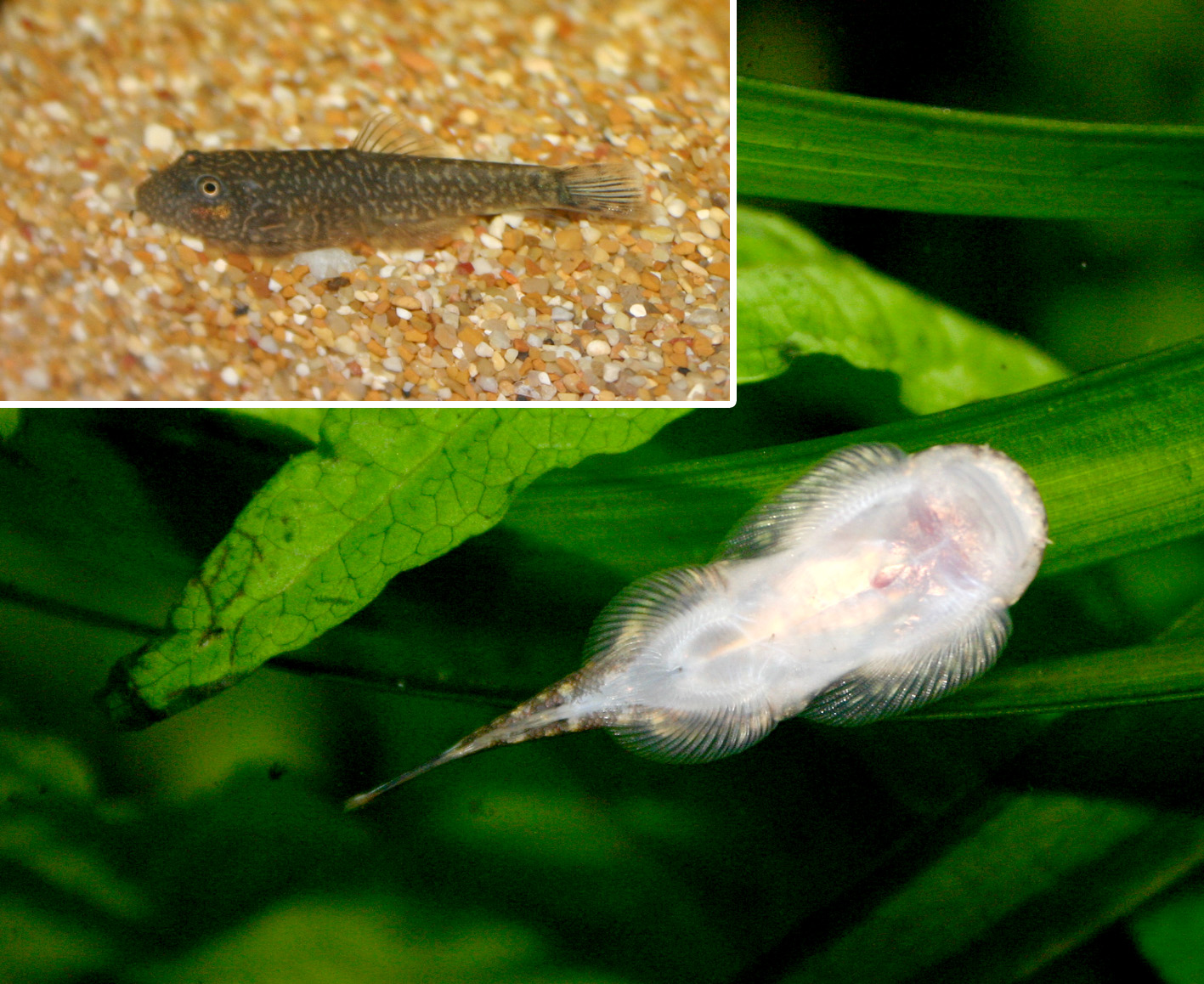
- Gastromyzon fasciatus

Scientific classification
- Kingdom: Animalia
- Phylum: Chordata
- Class: Actinopterygii
- Order: Cypriniformes
- Family: Gastromyzontidae
- Genus: Gastromyzon; Günther, 1874

Type species
- Gastromyzon borneensis Günther 1874

Species
- 36, see text.

Synonyms
- Lepidoglanis Vaillant, 1889

= Gastromyzon =

Genus of fishes

Gastromyzon is a genus of gastromyzontid loaches native to Borneo.

== Species ==
There are currently 36 species recognized in this genus:

- Gastromyzon aequabilis H. H. Tan, 2006
- Gastromyzon aeroides H. H. Tan & Sulaiman, 2006
- Gastromyzon auronigrus H. H. Tan, 2006
- Gastromyzon bario H. H. Tan, 2006
- Gastromyzon borneensis Günther, 1874
- Gastromyzon contractus T. R. Roberts, 1982
- Gastromyzon cornusaccus H. H. Tan, 2006
- Gastromyzon cranbrooki H. H. Tan & Sulaiman, 2006
- Gastromyzon crenastus H. H. Tan & M. U. C. Leh, 2006
- Gastromyzon ctenocephalus T. R. Roberts, 1982
- Gastromyzon danumensis P. K. Chin & Inger, 1989
- Gastromyzon embalohensis Rachmatika, 1998
- Gastromyzon extrorsus H. H. Tan, 2006
- Gastromyzon farragus H. H. Tan & M. U. C. Leh, 2006
- Gastromyzon fasciatus Inger & P. K. Chin, 1961
- Gastromyzon ingeri H. H. Tan, 2006
- Gastromyzon introrsus H. H. Tan, 2006
- Gastromyzon katibasensis M. U. C. Leh & P. K. P. Chai, 2003
- Gastromyzon lepidogaster [T. R. Roberts, 1982
- Gastromyzon megalepis T. R. Roberts, 1982
- Gastromyzon monticola (Vaillant, 1889)
- Gastromyzon ocellatus H. H. Tan & P. K. L. Ng, 2004
- Gastromyzon ornaticauda H. H. Tan & Martin-Smith, 1998
- Gastromyzon pariclavis H. H. Tan & Martin-Smith, 1998
- Gastromyzon praestans H. H. Tan, 2006
- Gastromyzon psiloetron H. H. Tan, 2006
- Gastromyzon punctulatus Inger & P. K. Chin, 1961 (Hillstream loach)
- Gastromyzon ridens T. R. Roberts, 1982
- Gastromyzon russulus H. H. Tan, 2006
- Gastromyzon scitulus H. H. Tan & M. U. C. Leh, 2006
- Gastromyzon spectabilis H. H. Tan, 2006
- Gastromyzon stellatus H. H. Tan, 2006
- Gastromyzon umbrus H. H. Tan, 2006
- Gastromyzon venustus H. H. Tan & Sulaiman, 2006
- Gastromyzon viriosus H. H. Tan, 2006
- Gastromyzon zebrinus H. H. Tan, 2006
