= Gastromyzon embalohensis =

Scientific classification
- Domain: Eukaryota
- Kingdom: Animalia
- Phylum: Chordata
- Class: Actinopterygii
- Order: Cypriniformes
- Family: Gastromyzontidae
- Genus: Gastromyzon
- Species: G. embalohensis

Binomial name
- Gastromyzon embalohensis Rachmatika, 1998

Species of fish

Gastromyzon embalohensis is a species of ray-finned fish in the genus Gastromyzon.

== Footnotes ==
- Froese, Rainer; Pauly, Daniel (eds.). "Gastromyzon embalohensis". FishBase.
