= Nemacheilus kapuasensis =

Scientific classification
- Domain: Eukaryota
- Kingdom: Animalia
- Phylum: Chordata
- Class: Actinopterygii
- Order: Cypriniformes
- Family: Nemacheilidae
- Genus: Nemacheilus
- Species: N. kapuasensis

Binomial name
- Nemacheilus kapuasensis Kottelat, 1984

Species of fish

Nemacheilus kapuasensis is a species of cyprinid fish in the genus Nemacheilus from Borneo and Sumatra.

== Footnotes ==
- Froese, Rainer; Pauly, Daniel (eds.). "Nemacheilus kapuasensis". FishBase.
