= Nemacheilus pfeifferae =

Scientific classification
- Kingdom: Animalia
- Phylum: Chordata
- Class: Actinopterygii
- Order: Cypriniformes
- Family: Nemacheilidae
- Genus: Nemacheilus
- Species: N. pfeifferae

Binomial name
- Nemacheilus pfeifferae (Bleeker, 1853)

Synonyms
- Cobitis pfeifferae Bleeker, 1853

Species of fish

Nemacheilus pfeifferae is a species of ray-finned fish in the genus Nemacheilus from Sumatra.

== Footnotes ==
- Froese, Rainer; Pauly, Daniel (eds.). "Nemacheilus pfeifferae". FishBase.
