= Nemacheilus saravacensis =

Scientific classification
- Kingdom: Animalia
- Phylum: Chordata
- Class: Actinopterygii
- Order: Cypriniformes
- Family: Nemacheilidae
- Genus: Nemacheilus
- Species: N. saravacensis

Binomial name
- Nemacheilus saravacensis Boulenger, 1894

Species of fish

Nemacheilus saravacensis is a species of ray-finned fish in the genus Nemacheilus from western Borneo.

== Footnotes ==
- Froese, Rainer; Pauly, Daniel (eds.). "Nemacheilus saravacensis". FishBase.
