= Nemacheilus binotatus =

Conservation status
- Data Deficient (IUCN 3.1)

Scientific classification
- Kingdom: Animalia
- Phylum: Chordata
- Class: Actinopterygii
- Order: Cypriniformes
- Family: Nemacheilidae
- Genus: Nemacheilus
- Species: N. binotatus

Binomial name
- Nemacheilus binotatus H. M. Smith, 1933

Species of fish

Nemacheilus binotatus is a species of ray-finned fish in the genus Nemacheilus which is found in the Chao Phraya and Maeklong basins in Thailand.

== Footnotes ==
- Froese, Rainer; Pauly, Daniel (eds.). "Nemacheilus binotatus". FishBase.
