= Nemacheilus banar =

Conservation status
- Vulnerable (IUCN 3.1)

Scientific classification
- Kingdom: Animalia
- Phylum: Chordata
- Class: Actinopterygii
- Order: Cypriniformes
- Family: Nemacheilidae
- Genus: Nemacheilus
- Species: N. banar

Binomial name
- Nemacheilus banar Freyhof & Serov, 2001

Species of fish

Nemacheilus banar is a species of ray-finned fish in the genus Nemacheilus, it has currently only been recorded in Vietnam but it may occur also in Laos.

== Footnotes ==
- Froese, Rainer; Pauly, Daniel (eds.). "Nemacheilus banar". FishBase.
