= Gastromyzon monticola =

Scientific classification
- Kingdom: Animalia
- Phylum: Chordata
- Class: Actinopterygii
- Order: Cypriniformes
- Family: Gastromyzontidae
- Genus: Gastromyzon
- Species: G. monticola

Binomial name
- Gastromyzon monticola (Vaillant, 1889)

Synonyms
- Lepidoglanis monticola Vaillant, 1889

Species of fish

Gastromyzon monticola is a species of ray-finned fish in the genus Gastromyzon.

== Footnotes ==
- Froese, Rainer; Pauly, Daniel (eds.). "Gastromyzon monticola". FishBase.
