= Nemacheilus elegantissimus =

Scientific classification
- Domain: Eukaryota
- Kingdom: Animalia
- Phylum: Chordata
- Class: Actinopterygii
- Order: Cypriniformes
- Family: Nemacheilidae
- Genus: Nemacheilus
- Species: N. elegantissimus

Binomial name
- Nemacheilus elegantissimus P. K. Chin & Samat, 1992

Species of fish

Nemacheilus elegantissimus is a species of ray-finned fish in the genus Nemacheilus from Sabah.

== Footnotes ==
- Froese, Rainer; Pauly, Daniel (eds.). "Nemacheilus elegantissimus". FishBase.
