= Nemacheilus ornatus =

Conservation status
- Data Deficient (IUCN 3.1)

Scientific classification
- Kingdom: Animalia
- Phylum: Chordata
- Class: Actinopterygii
- Order: Cypriniformes
- Family: Nemacheilidae
- Genus: Nemacheilus
- Species: N. ornatus

Binomial name
- Nemacheilus ornatus Kottelat, 1990

Synonyms
- Noemacheilus ornatus (Kottelat, 1990)

Species of fish

Nemacheilus ornatus is a species of ray-finned fish in the genus Nemacheilus which is only known from the Tapi River basin in Thailand.

== Footnotes ==
- Froese, Rainer; Pauly, Daniel (eds.). "Nemacheilus ornatus". FishBase.
