= Nemacheilus spiniferus =

Scientific classification
- Kingdom: Animalia
- Phylum: Chordata
- Class: Actinopterygii
- Order: Cypriniformes
- Family: Nemacheilidae
- Genus: Nemacheilus
- Species: N. spiniferus

Binomial name
- Nemacheilus spiniferus Kottelat, 1984

Species of fish

Nemacheilus spiniferus is a species of cyprinid fish in the genus Nemacheilus from western and north western Borneo.

== Footnotes ==
- Froese, Rainer; Pauly, Daniel (eds.). "Nemacheilus spiniferus". FishBase.
