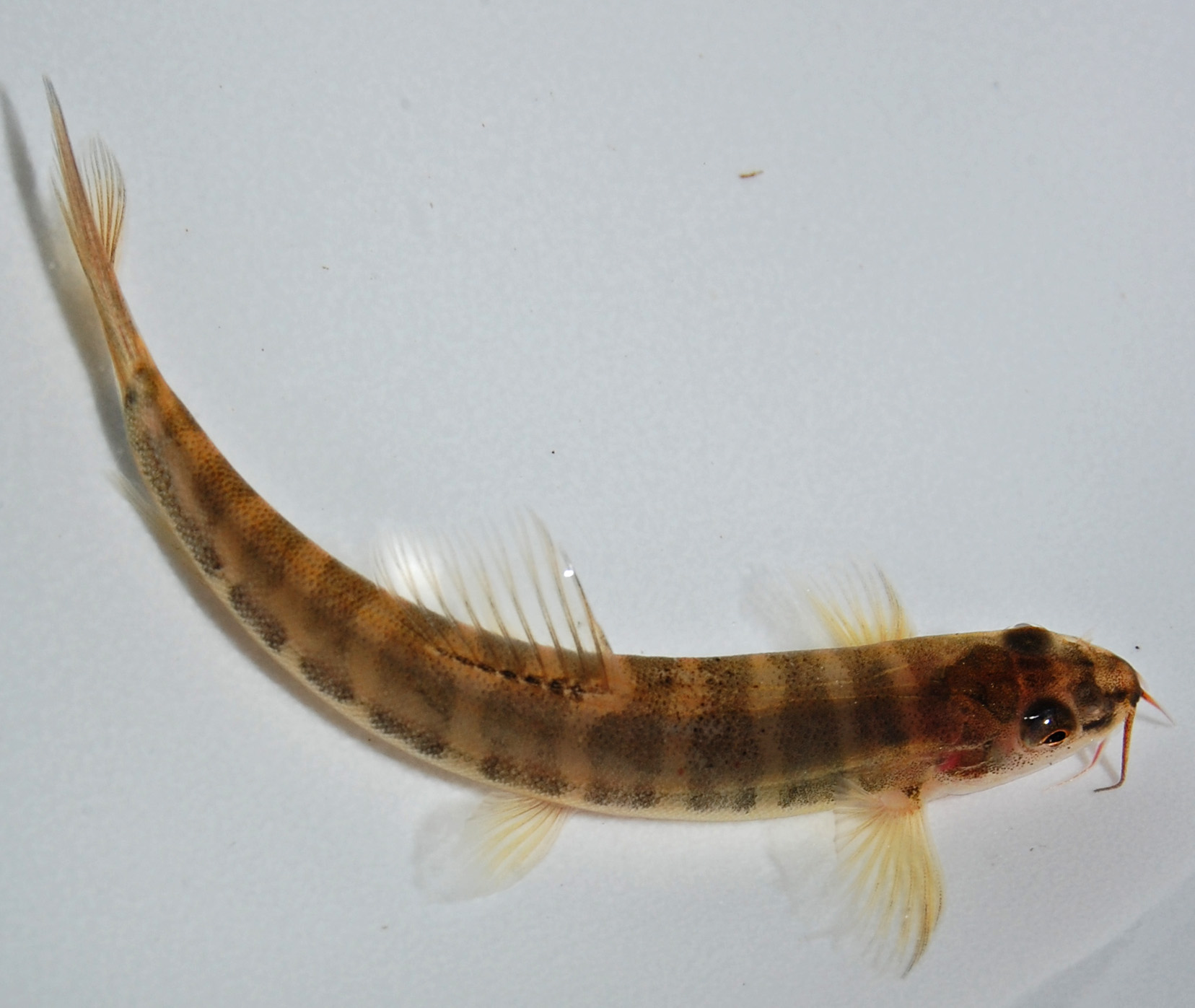
- Barred Loach (N. fasciatus)

Scientific classification
- Kingdom: Animalia
- Phylum: Chordata
- Class: Actinopterygii
- Division: Teleostei
- Order: Cypriniformes
- Family: Nemacheilidae
- Genus: Nemacheilus; Bleeker, 1863

Type species
- Nemacheilus fasciatus Valenciennes, 1846

Synonyms
- Modigliania Perugia, 1893; Pogononemacheilus Fowler 1937

= Nemacheilus =

Genus of fishes

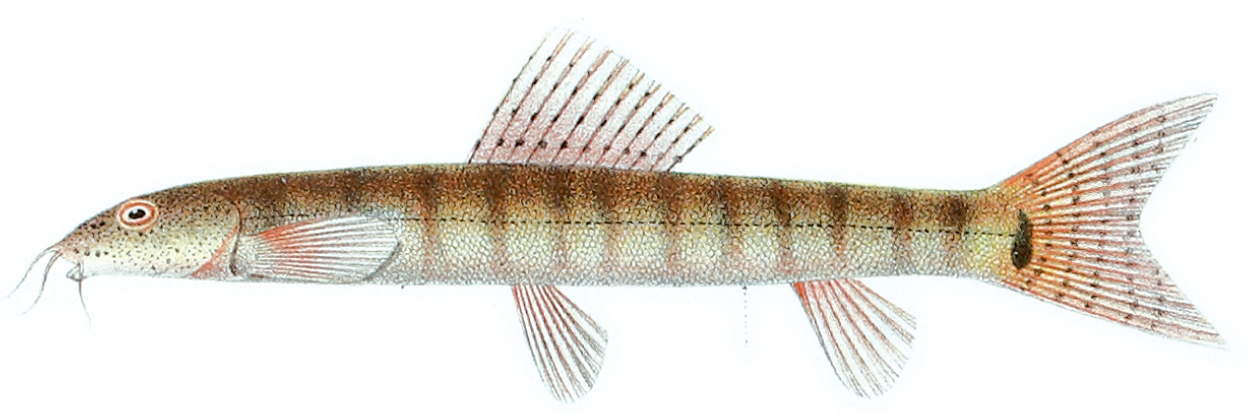
Nemacheilus jaklesii

Nemacheilus is a genus of stone loaches native to Asia.

== Nomenclature ==
The genus name has occasionally appeared in scientific literature as Noemacheilus, an incorrect subsequent spelling of Nemacheilus. This variant, Nematocheilus, Nemacheilos and Nematocheilos are not valid synonyms under the International Code of Zoological Nomenclature and are treated as lapsus calami in modern taxonomic works. Noemacheilus Kuhl & van Hasselt, 1823 is considered a nomen nudum. Nemachilus Günther, 1868 is an unjustified emendation.

== Species ==
These are the currently recognized species in this genus:

- Nemacheilus anguilla Annandale, 1919 (eel loach)
- Nemacheilus banar Freyhof & Serov, 2001
- Nemacheilus binotatus H. M. Smith, 1933
- Nemacheilus cacao Bohlen, Kottelat & Šlechtová, 2022
- Nemacheilus chrysolaimos (Valenciennes, 1846)
- Nemacheilus cleopatra Freyhof & Serov, 2001
- Nemacheilus corica (F. Hamilton, 1822) (incertae sedis, most likely in this genus)
- Nemacheilus elegantissimus P. K. Chin & Samat, 1992
- Nemacheilus fasciatus (Valenciennes, 1846) (Barred loach)
- Nemacheilus jaklesii (Bleeker, 1852) (species inquirenda, most likely in this genus)
- Nemacheilus kaimurensis Husain & Tilak, 1998 (incertae sedis, most likely in this genus)
- Nemacheilus kapuasensis Kottelat, 1984
- Nemacheilus longipectoralis Popta, 1905
- Nemacheilus longipinnis C. G. E. Ahl, 1922
- Nemacheilus longistriatus Kottelat, 1990
- Nemacheilus marang Hadiaty & Kottelat, 2010
- Nemacheilus masyae H. M. Smith, 1933 (Arrow loach)
- Nemacheilus nandingensis Zhu & Wang, 1985
- Nemacheilus olivaceus Boulenger, 1894
- Nemacheilus ornatus Kottelat, 1990
- Nemacheilus pallidus Kottelat, 1990
- Nemacheilus papillos H. H. Tan & Kottelat, 2009
- Nemacheilus paucimaculatus Bohlen & Šlechtová, 2011
- Nemacheilus pezidion Kottelat, 2022
- Nemacheilus pfeifferae (Bleeker, 1853)
- Nemacheilus platiceps Kottelat, 1990
- Nemacheilus pullus Kottelat, 2023
- Nemacheilus rueppelli (Sykes, 1839) (Mongoose loach)
- Nemacheilus saravacensis Boulenger, 1894
- Nemacheilus spiniferus Kottelat, 1984
- Nemacheilus stigmofasciatus Arunachalam & Muralidharan, 2009 (incertae sedis, most likely in this genus)
- Nemacheilus tebo Hadiaty & Kottelat, 2009
- Nemacheilus troglocataractus Kottelat & Géry, 1989 (Blind cave loach)
- Nemacheilus tuberigum Hadiaty & Siebert, 2001
- Nemacheilus zonatus Page, Pfeiffer, Suksri, Randall & Boyd, 2020
