= Nemacheilus longistriatus =

Conservation status
- Least Concern (IUCN 3.1)

Scientific classification
- Kingdom: Animalia
- Phylum: Chordata
- Class: Actinopterygii
- Order: Cypriniformes
- Family: Nemacheilidae
- Genus: Nemacheilus
- Species: N. longistriatus

Binomial name
- Nemacheilus longistriatus Kottelat, 1990

Synonyms
- Noemacheilus longistriatus (Kottelat, 1990)

Species of fish

Nemacheilus longistriatus is a species of ray-finned fish in the genus Nemacheilus. It is found in the middle Mekong basin from Chiang Rai to Cambodia and Laos, in Cambodia it occurs in Tonle Sap.

== Footnotes ==
- Froese, Rainer; Pauly, Daniel (eds.). "Nemacheilus longistriatus". FishBase.
