= Nemacheilus stigmofasciatus =

Conservation status
- Data Deficient (IUCN 3.1)

Scientific classification
- Kingdom: Animalia
- Phylum: Chordata
- Class: Actinopterygii
- Order: Cypriniformes
- Family: Nemacheilidae
- Genus: Nemacheilus
- Species: N. stigmofasciatus

Binomial name
- Nemacheilus stigmofasciatus Arunachalam & Muralidharan, 2009

Species of fish

Nemacheilus stigmofasciatus, the Thuttinjet stone loach, is a species of ray-finned fish in the genus Nemacheilus which has been recorded from just one locality in the west flowing river Seethanathi at Thuttinjet in Karnataka. This locality is at an altitude of 199m above sea level and has many cascades and waterfalls in its upstream portion. The stream is dominated by the presence of pebbles and boulders with gravel and sand making up approximately 5% of the substrate.

== Footnotes ==
- Froese, Rainer; Pauly, Daniel (eds.). "Nemacheilus stigmofasciatus". FishBase.
