= Nemacheilus platiceps =

Conservation status
- Data Deficient (IUCN 3.1)

Scientific classification
- Kingdom: Animalia
- Phylum: Chordata
- Class: Actinopterygii
- Order: Cypriniformes
- Family: Nemacheilidae
- Genus: Nemacheilus
- Species: N. platiceps

Binomial name
- Nemacheilus platiceps Kottelat, 1990

Species of fish

Nemacheilus platiceps is a species of ray-finned fish in the genus Nemacheilus. It has been recorded in the lower Mekong basin in eastern Thailand, central and southern Laos, Cambodia and Vietnam. Its habitat is stretches of rivers with a gravel substrate where there is a moderate to rapid current in the lowlands and in foothills. It is consumed locally in subsistence fisheries and is occasionally found in the aquarium trade.

== Footnotes ==
- Froese, Rainer; Pauly, Daniel (eds.). "Nemacheilus platiceps". FishBase.
