= Nemacheilus papillos =

Conservation status
- Least Concern (IUCN 3.1)

Scientific classification
- Kingdom: Animalia
- Phylum: Chordata
- Class: Actinopterygii
- Order: Cypriniformes
- Family: Nemacheilidae
- Genus: Nemacheilus
- Species: N. papillos

Binomial name
- Nemacheilus papillos H. H. Tan & Kottelat, 2009

Species of fish

Nemacheilus papillos is a species of cyprinid fish. It occurs in Indonesia (Sumatra, Java, and some smaller islands) and Peninsular Malaysia. It is a demersal species that inhabits tributary and larger rivers.

Nemacheilus papillos grows to 5.6 cm (2.2 in) standard length.
