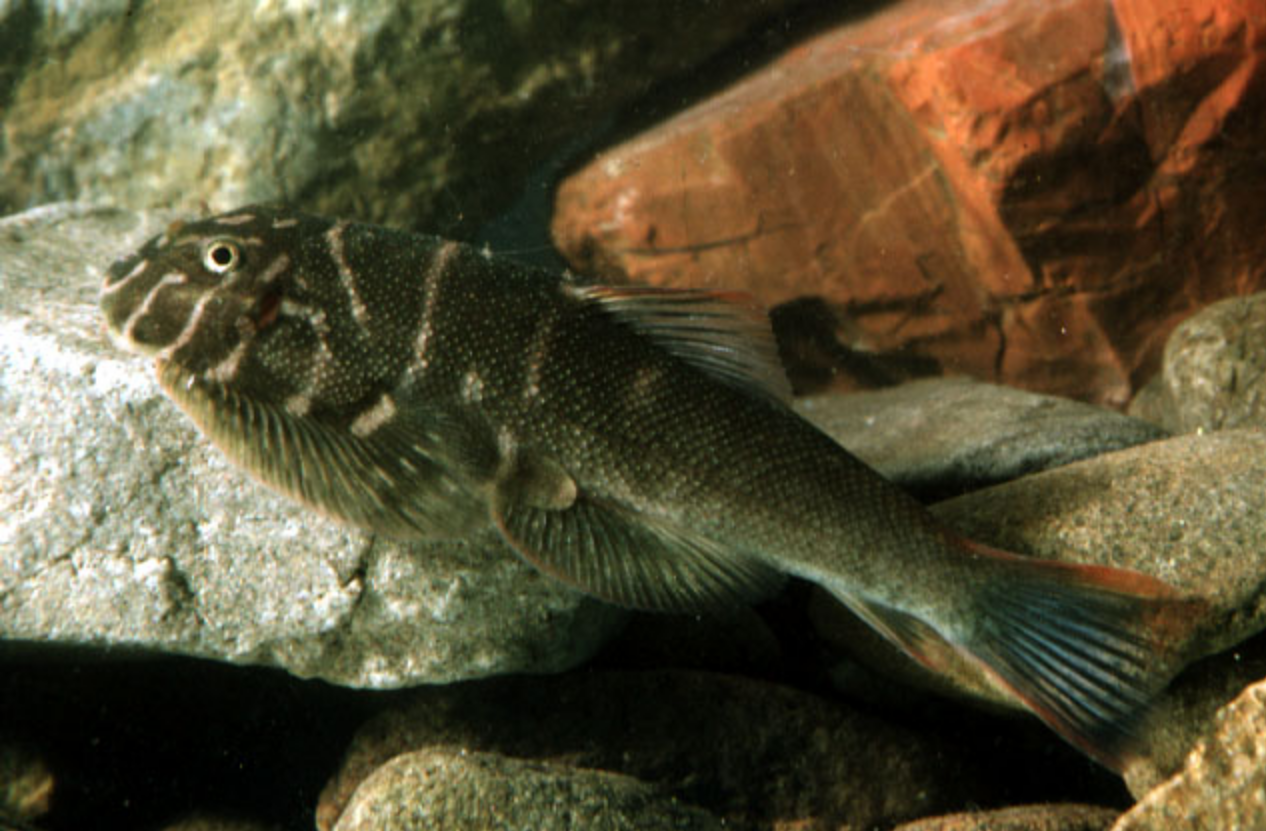

Conservation status
- Least Concern (IUCN 3.1)

Scientific classification
- Kingdom: Animalia
- Phylum: Chordata
- Class: Actinopterygii
- Order: Cypriniformes
- Family: Gastromyzontidae
- Genus: Gastromyzon
- Species: G. ornaticauda

Binomial name
- Gastromyzon ornaticauda H. H. Tan & Martin-Smith, 1998

= Gastromyzon ornaticauda =

Species of fish

Gastromyzon ornaticauda, commonly referred to as the ornate Borneo sucker, blue-tailed Borneo loach or various combinations thereof, is a hillstream loach of the family Gastromyzontidae. Both its common names and species classification (ornaticauda for “decorated tail”) reference its uniquely striking tail coloration.

== Taxonomy ==
First described by Tan and Martin-Smith from a 1996 collection, G. ornaticauda is a member of the family Gastromyzontidae from the suborder Cobitoidei (loaches) within the order Cypriniformes (minnows, carps, loaches, and more) of Actinopterygii (ray-finned fishes). Gastromyzontidae comprises 28 total genera, including the genus Gastromyzon with 46 described species. The name Gastromyzontidae (“Stomach” + “Suckle”) refers to the unique fin disc that allows this family to adhere to substrates in shallow torrent streams.

It lives alongside several members of its genus (G. danumensis, G. lepidogaster and G. pariclavis) and is distinguished by its unique combination of vibrant tail color pattern (absent in all others), post-oral pouch (absent in all others), absence of secondary rostrum (present in G. danumensis), absence of scales on belly (present in G. danumensis and G. lepidogaster), vertical gill slits (angular in G. Paraclavis), conical tubercles within a slight indentation at the snout tip, blunt snout, and 60-64 scales along the lateral line.

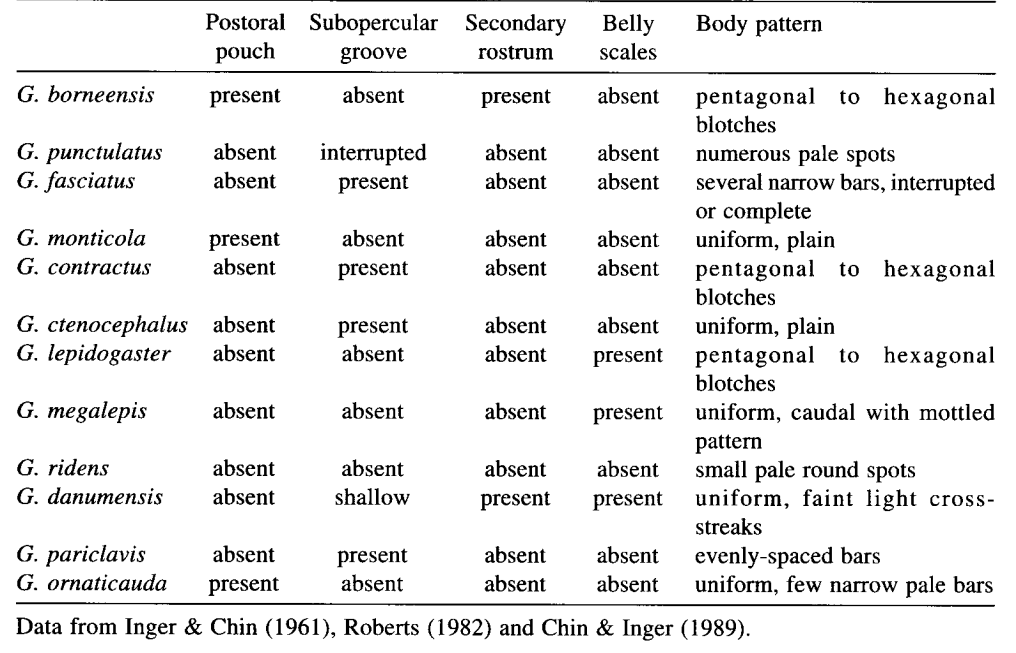
Comparative morphological data (part 2) to distinguish unique Gastromyzon species (Tan & Martin-Smith 1998).

== Description ==
=== Color ===
The titular “decorated tail” of G. ornaticauda features reddish dorsal (top) and ventral (bottom) margins bordering a bluish green middle section in live specimens. These colors fade upon preservation. The dorsal fin originates from a dark blotch at the anterior base (front) and possesses darkly pigmented rays spanned by clear membranes, and sometimes a reddish dorsal margin (top edge). The anal, pelvic, and pectoral fins have dark membranes. All fins possess a yellowish distal margin (outer edge) to varying degrees. The body color is uniformly brown on the top with 3-4 narrow pale vertical bars, and whitish on the belly. The head may or may not possess 4-5 narrow pale vertical stripes on each side and a stripe down the middle of the snout.

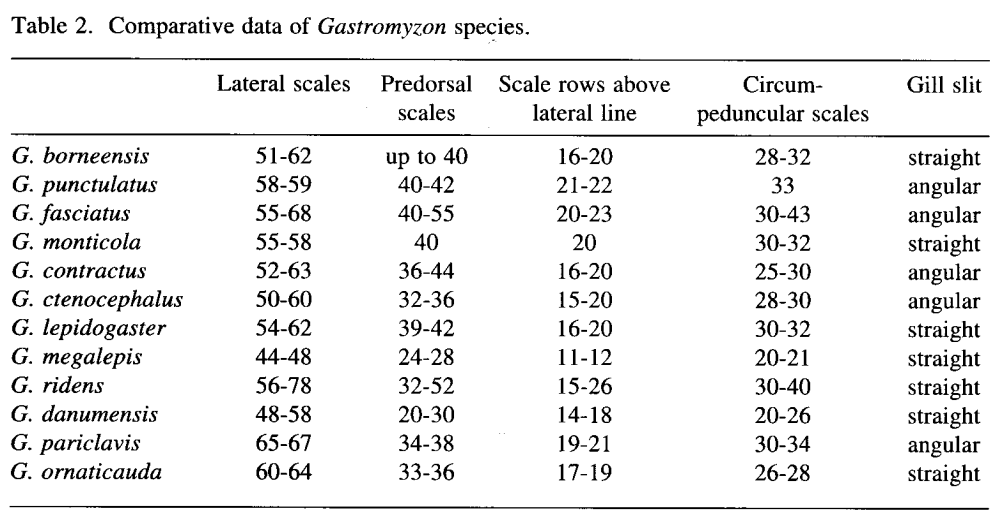
Comparative morphological data to distinguish unique Gastromyzon species from Tan & Martin-Smith 1998.

=== Morphology ===
Like other Gastromyzon hillstream loaches, G. ornaticauda has a tear-drop shaped body when viewed top-down, tapering from a broad round snout and head to a narrow posterior end. They possess a unique ventral fin disc on their underside that is formed by the pectoral fins, pelvic fins and flaps in between. This disc generates friction and suction to adhere to the substrate in benthic hillstream environments with high flow rates. Gastromyzon pectoral fins are greatly enlarged, with up to twice as many branched pectoral fin rays as most other cyprinoid fish. Furthermore, the gill openings are much smaller than other cypriniform fish to prevent interference with the ventral fin disc. They also possess unicellular hooks on their ventral surface to maximize friction with the substrate and facilitate adhesion.

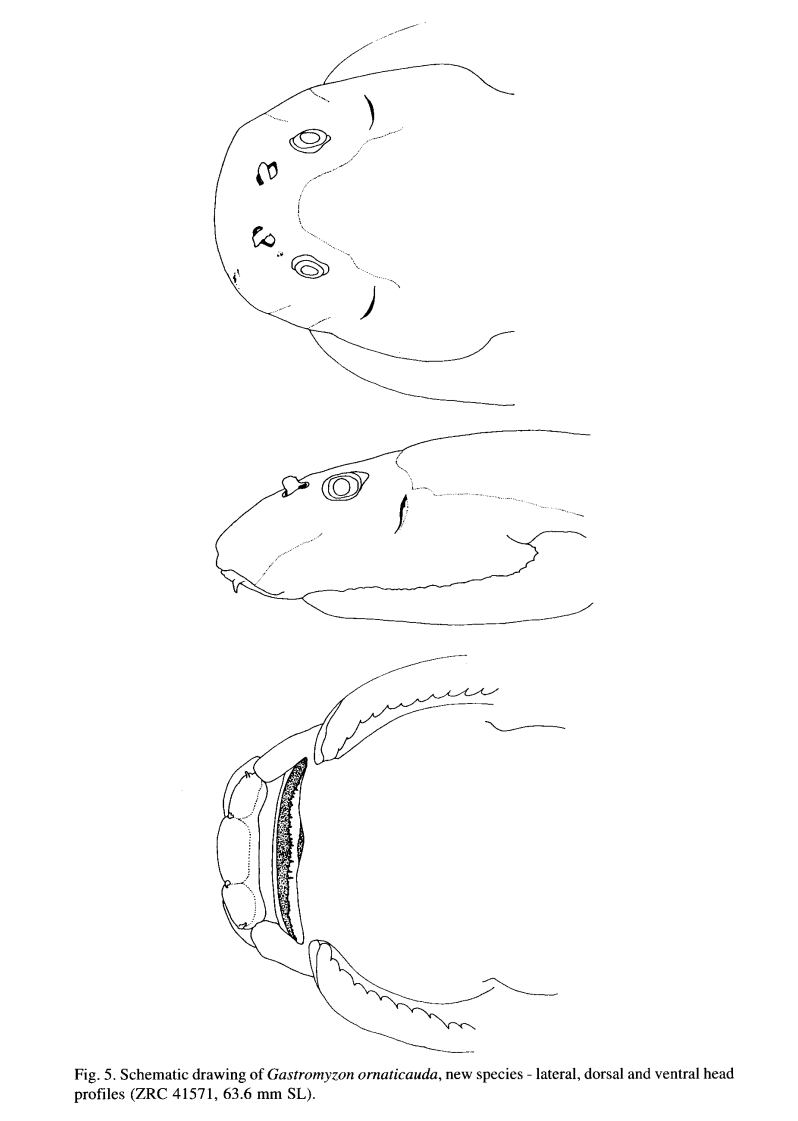
Dorsal, lateral and ventral head profiles (ZRC 41571, 63.6 mm SL).

The unique morphological features of G. ornaticauda were first described in detail by Martin-Smith and Tan and are summarized as follows: The Head is relatively blunt, wide and flat; the tip of snout possesses a small indentation with conical tubercles (bumps); the gill slit is straight, vertical and the same length as the eye diameter; the subopercle bone of the operculum (gill flap) lacks a groove; it possess a pouch below the mouth; it lacks scales on the belly; the pectoral fin overlaps the front 1/5th of the pelvic fin; the pelvic and dorsal fins ends before the start of the anal fin; the pectoral and pelvic fins have dorsal serrae (prickly tops); the dorsal fin is situation at the middle of the body length; dorsal fin bent towards the rear (adpressed); the deepest portion of the body is below the start of the dorsal fin; anus between the pelvic fin disc and anal fin; some specimens with up to 10 tubercules on the outer segment of the first anal-fin ray; relatively deep and short caudal peduncle; 60-64 scales along the lateral line.

=== Sexual dimorphism ===
Some sources suggest that females are larger and broader at maturity, and that males are more slender with slightly more vibrant coloration. Some other Gastromyzon species exhibit sex-based size differences, however sexual dimorphism is not well documented for this species in the peer-reviewed literature.

=== Juvenile morphology ===
Juveniles of genus Gastromyzon are smaller than mature adults and generally possess more defined striping or net-like patterning that homogenize with maturity.

== Distribution and maps ==
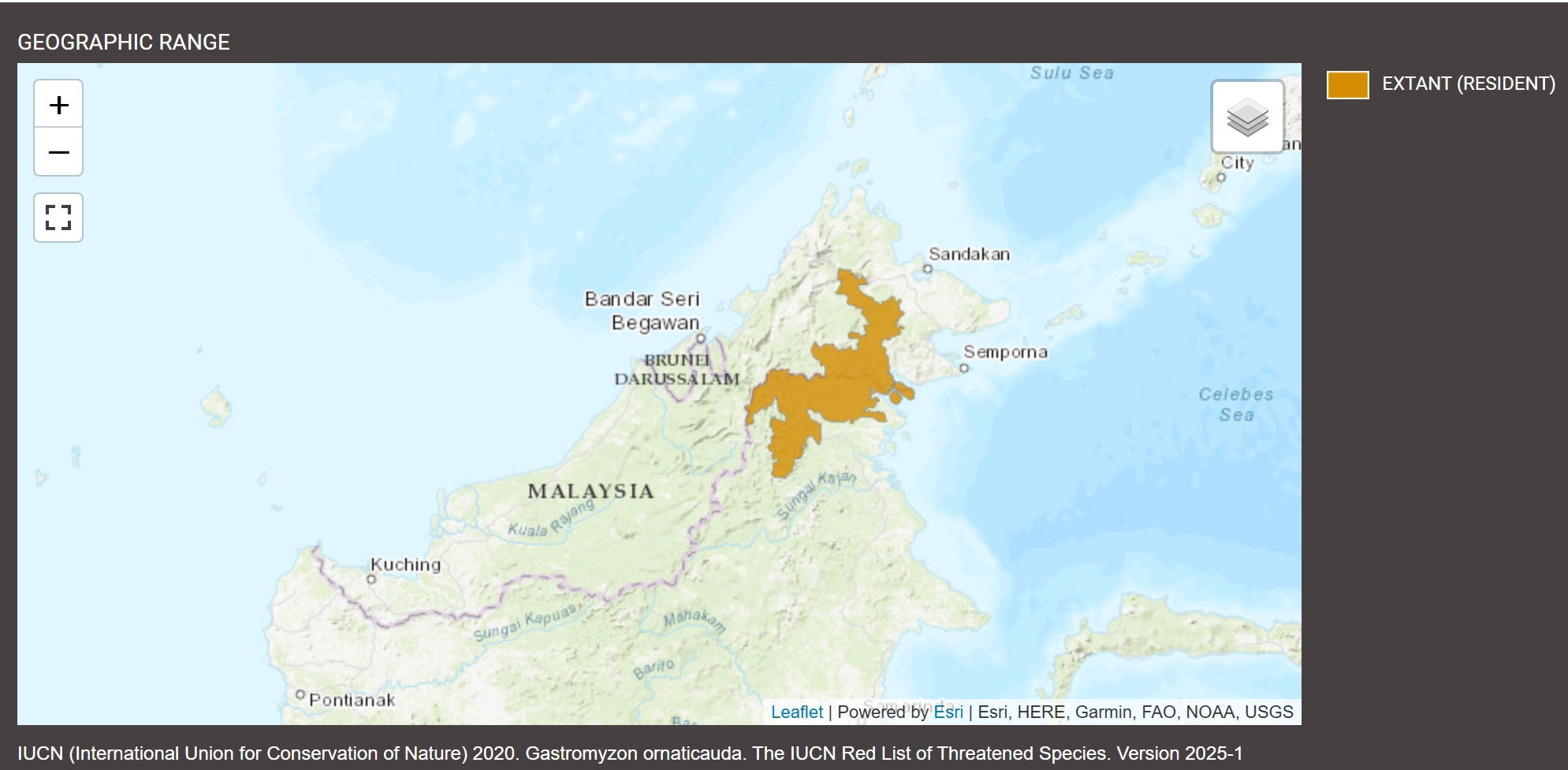
G. ornaticauda native range in the Sungai Kinabatangan basin, east Sabah, Malaysian Borneo.

G. ornaticauda was first documented in October 1996 on the island of Borneo, in the Kuamut tributary headwaters (Sungai Kuamut) of the Kinabatangan river in the state of Sabah, Malaysia (5°00'40.0"N 117°31'40.0"E, ~1,200m altitude). This area lies within the Danum Valley Conservation Area, an incredibly biodiverse and relatively untouched forest of dipterocarp trees. It has a particularly high diversity of terrestrial invertebrates and has hosted rare specimens such as the Sumatran rhino and the world’s tallest tropical tree. G. ornaticauda dwells in freshwater streams, the most diverse freshwater habitat in Malaysia. This species prefers shallow, fast-flowing segments of stream with stony substrate.

== Biology, behavior, and life history ==
Like its relatives, G. ornaticauda is described as a grazer, subsisting off biofilms comprising algae and diatoms. This dietary specialization is reflected in their inferior mouth and hypercoiled gut.

Little is documented about the life history of G. ornaticauda including early development and maximal longevity. Other Gastromyzon species have been documented to exhibit seasonal changes in gonadosomatic index that indicate changes in reproductive status that suggest biannual or seasonal spawning. Mature female Gastromyzon specimens have been documented to carry 174 to 1504 oocytes. Some anecdotal reports suggest that increasing temperature and feeding volume over several weeks may induce captive spawning in some Gastromyzon species.

== Cultural and economic value ==
G. ornaticauda is wild caught in Malaysian Borneo and exported globally in the aquarium trade. It is available for purchase across numerous online retail sites. In 2014, the total Malaysian ornamental fish export was valued 41.3 million USD, however the economic contribution of G. ornaticauda is not documented. Furthermore, the ecological impacts of wild fish collection in Malaysia have yet to be comprehensively investigated. Aquarium retailers describe G. ornaticauda as a gregarious fish that best thrives in small groups. In captivity, they benefit from highly oxygenated water and pumps to increase the flow rate. Retailers recommend feeding sinking algae-wafers, protein pellets and blanched vegetables to supplement their grazing of biofilm.

== Conservation status and environmental impact ==
Little is known about the conservation status of G. ornaticauda. The IUCN has assessed this species as Least Concern as of 2019, but relied on few publications from many years prior. There is no precise information on the population size or trend, however the IUCN has estimated an extant population of 10,000 to 100,000 mature individuals, given its relatively large distribution and abundance in the Kumuat headwaters. Various threats may challenge the conservation status of G. ornaticauda, including habitat destruction for farming, ranching and logging, as well as fishing (especially in Sabah). G. ornaticauda is wild caught for the aquarium trade, as are many other Gastromyzon species, and captive breeding is not well documented. The effects of the aquarium trade on G. ornaticauda are unknown, however populations of other wild fishes have been decimated in Borneo and globally. The crucial role of herbivorous fishes in regulating stream biomass, primary productivity, biodiversity, and more is well documented. As such, a decline in G. ornaticauda or other Gastromyzon populations would likely cause significant alterations to the stream ecosystems of Borneo by reducing the grazing of biofilm and plant matter.
