= Gastromyzon katibasensis =

Scientific classification
- Domain: Eukaryota
- Kingdom: Animalia
- Phylum: Chordata
- Class: Actinopterygii
- Order: Cypriniformes
- Family: Gastromyzontidae
- Genus: Gastromyzon
- Species: G. katibasensis

Binomial name
- Gastromyzon katibasensis M. U. C. Leh & P. K. P. Chai, 2003

Species of fish

Gastromyzon katibasensis is a species of ray-finned fish in the genus Gastromyzon.

== Footnotes ==
- Froese, Rainer; Pauly, Daniel (eds.). "Gastromyzon katibasensis". FishBase.
