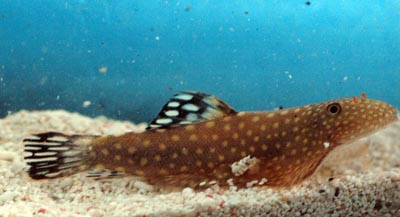

Scientific classification
- Kingdom: Animalia
- Phylum: Chordata
- Class: Actinopterygii
- Order: Cypriniformes
- Family: Gastromyzontidae
- Genus: Gastromyzon
- Species: G. ctenocephalus

Binomial name
- Gastromyzon ctenocephalus T. R. Roberts, 1982

= Gastromyzon ctenocephalus =

Species of fish

Gastromyzon ctenocephalus is a species of ray-finned fish in the genus Gastromyzon.

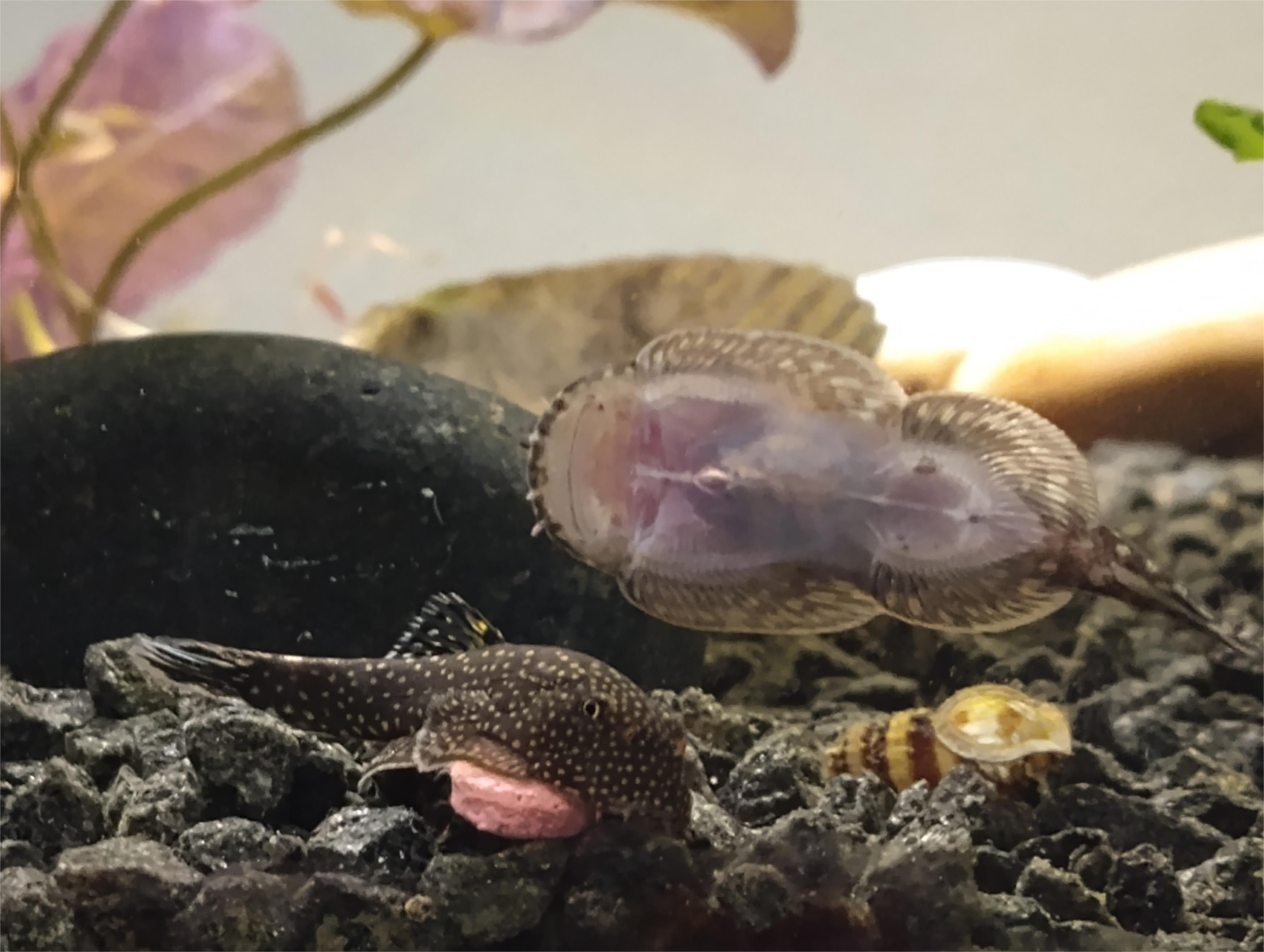
Two Gastromyzon ctenocephalus aquarium specimens

== Footnotes ==
- Froese, Rainer; Pauly, Daniel (eds.). "Gastromyzon ctenocephalus". FishBase.
