= Nemacheilus tebo =

Scientific classification
- Kingdom: Animalia
- Phylum: Chordata
- Class: Actinopterygii
- Order: Cypriniformes
- Family: Nemacheilidae
- Genus: Nemacheilus
- Species: N. tebo

Binomial name
- Nemacheilus tebo Hadiaty & Kottelat, 2009

Species of fish

Nemacheilus tebo is a species of ray-finned fish in the genus Nemacheilus from Kalimantan Timur in Indonesia.

== Footnotes ==
- Froese, Rainer; Pauly, Daniel (eds.). "Nemacheilus tebo". FishBase.
