= Gastromyzon ingeri =

Scientific classification
- Domain: Eukaryota
- Kingdom: Animalia
- Phylum: Chordata
- Class: Actinopterygii
- Order: Cypriniformes
- Family: Gastromyzontidae
- Genus: Gastromyzon
- Species: G. ingeri

Binomial name
- Gastromyzon ingeri H. H. Tan, 2006

Species of fish

Gastromyzon ingeri is a species of river loach (family Balitoridae or Gastromyzontidae, depending on the source). It is named for Robert F. Inger. It is endemic to Sabah, Borneo, where it occurs in rivers draining into Wallace Bay. It inhabits fast flowing rocky streams and grows to 5.4 cm (2.1 in) standard length.
