= Nemacheilus pallidus =

Conservation status
- Least Concern (IUCN 3.1)

Scientific classification
- Kingdom: Animalia
- Phylum: Chordata
- Class: Actinopterygii
- Order: Cypriniformes
- Family: Nemacheilidae
- Genus: Nemacheilus
- Species: N. pallidus

Binomial name
- Nemacheilus pallidus Kottelat, 1990

Synonyms
- Noemacheilus pallidus (Kottelat, 1990)

Species of fish

Nemacheilus pallidus is a species of ray-finned fish in the genus Nemacheilus which occurs in the lower Mekong basin in Thailand, Laos, Cambodia and Vietnam, as well as in the Chao Phraya and Maeklong basins in Thailand.

== Footnotes ==
- Froese, Rainer; Pauly, Daniel (eds.). "Nemacheilus pallidus". FishBase.
