= Nemacheilus longipectoralis =

Scientific classification
- Domain: Eukaryota
- Kingdom: Animalia
- Phylum: Chordata
- Class: Actinopterygii
- Order: Cypriniformes
- Family: Nemacheilidae
- Genus: Nemacheilus
- Species: N. longipectoralis

Binomial name
- Nemacheilus longipectoralis Popta, 1905

Species of fish

Nemacheilus longipectoralis is a species of ray-finned fish in the genus Nemacheilus.

== Footnotes ==
- Froese, Rainer; Pauly, Daniel (eds.). "Nemacheilus longipectoralis". FishBase.
