= Nemacheilus olivaceus =

Scientific classification
- Kingdom: Animalia
- Phylum: Chordata
- Class: Actinopterygii
- Order: Cypriniformes
- Family: Nemacheilidae
- Genus: Nemacheilus
- Species: N. olivaceus

Binomial name
- Nemacheilus olivaceus Boulenger, 1894

Species of fish

Nemacheilus olivaceus is a species of stone loach native to the benthopelagic freshwaters and tropical climates of such countries as: Indonesia and Malaysia.

They are omnivores and their diet consist primarily of macro algae, smaller fish, aquatic weeds, and more.

== Footnotes ==
- Froese, Rainer; Pauly, Daniel (eds.). "Nemacheilus olivaceus". FishBase.
