= Blind cave loach =

Conservation status
- Critically Endangered (IUCN 3.1)

Scientific classification
- Kingdom: Animalia
- Phylum: Chordata
- Class: Actinopterygii
- Division: Teleostei
- Order: Cypriniformes
- Family: Nemacheilidae
- Genus: Nemacheilus
- Species: N. troglocataractus

Binomial name
- Nemacheilus troglocataractus Kottelat & Géry, 1989

Species of fish

The Blind cave loach (Nemacheilus troglocataractus) is a species of troglobitic stone loach endemic to Thailand. It is only known from one subterranean stream in the Sai Yok Noi cave, which also is inhabited by Pterocryptis buccata. The blind cave loach has no eyes and lacks pigmentation. It grows to 6.8 cm (2.7 in) SL. Despite its common name, there are several other species of blind cave-living loaches.
