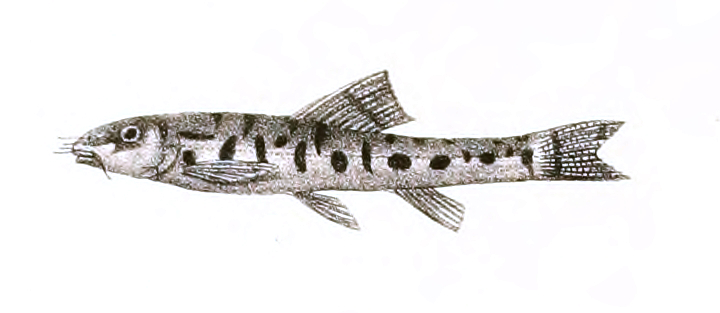

Conservation status
- Least Concern (IUCN 3.1)

Scientific classification
- Kingdom: Animalia
- Phylum: Chordata
- Class: Actinopterygii
- Order: Cypriniformes
- Family: Nemacheilidae
- Genus: Nemacheilus
- Species: N. corica

Binomial name
- Nemacheilus corica (F. Hamilton, 1822)

Synonyms
- Cobitis corica Hamilton, 1822; Noemacheilus corica (Hamilton, 1822); Schistura corica (Hamilton, 1822); Schistura punctata McClelland, 1839; Cobites cinerea Swainson, 1839; Acoura cinerea (Swainson, 1839)

= Nemacheilus corica =

Species of fish

Nemacheilus corica is a species of ray-finned fish in the genus Nemacheilus. It occurs in the foothills of the Himalayas in the drainage of the Ganges in Nepal and the Indian states of Uttar Pradesh, Uttarakhand, Bihar and West Bengal. Its reported presence in other areas need to be confirmed.
