= Gastromyzon lepidogaster =

Conservation status
- Least Concern (IUCN 3.1)

Scientific classification
- Kingdom: Animalia
- Phylum: Chordata
- Class: Actinopterygii
- Order: Cypriniformes
- Family: Gastromyzontidae
- Genus: Gastromyzon
- Species: G. lepidogaster

Binomial name
- Gastromyzon lepidogaster T. R. Roberts, 1982

Species of fish

Gastromyzon lepidogaster is a species of river loach (family Balitoridae or Gastromyzontidae, depending on the source). It is endemic to northern Borneo. It inhabits riffles and grows to 10.2 cm (4.0 in) standard length.
