= Luang Masya Chitrakarn =

Luang Masya Chitrakarn (also known as just Prasop Teeranunt) (Thai: หลวงมัศยจิตรการ, pronounced [lɯaŋ mát.sa.já t͡ɕít.traː.kaːn]), ประสพ ตีระนันท์, pronounced [lɯaŋ mát.sa.já t͡ɕít.traː.kaːn]) 1896–1905) was a Thai fisheries scientist and scientific illustrator, regarded as one of the pioneers of fisheries science in Thailand. After completing his studies in fine arts in England, he and Chote Suvatti assisted H.M. Smith, an American ichthyologist, in documenting fish species in Thailand. His most notable work was producing highly accurate illustrations of fish in both colour and black-and-white line drawings, adhering strictly to scientific standards. In recognition of his contributions, at two newly discovered fish species by H.M. Smith were named in his honour.

In 2011, the Department of Fisheries published and distributed a collection of his works titled Masya Chitrakarn, compiling his illustrations from 1923 onward, as a tribute to his legacy.

== Eponymous species ==
- Nemacheilus masyai Smith, 1933
- Puntius masyai Smith, 1945
