= Sabah bow-fingered gecko =

Conservation status
- Least Concern (IUCN 3.1)

Scientific classification
- Kingdom: Animalia
- Phylum: Chordata
- Class: Reptilia
- Order: Squamata
- Suborder: Gekkota
- Family: Gekkonidae
- Genus: Cyrtodactylus
- Species: C. ingeri

Binomial name
- Cyrtodactylus ingeri Hikida, 1990

Synonyms
- Cyrtodactylus ingeri Hikida, 1990; Gonydactylus ingeri — Tan, 1993; Cyrtodactylus (Cyrtodactylus) ingeri — Rösler, 2000; Cyrtodactylus ingeri — Grismer, 2005

Gecko endemic to Malaysia

The Sabah bow-fingered gecko (Cyrtodactylus ingeri), also known commonly as Inger's bow-fingered gecko, is a species of lizard in the family Gekkonidae. The species is endemic to Sabah in Malaysia.

== Etymology ==
The specific name, ingeri, is in honor of American herpetologist Robert F. Inger.

== Habitat ==
The preferred natural habitat of C. ingeri is forest, at altitudes from sea level to 800 m (2,600 ft).

== Description ==
C. ingeri may attain a snout-to-vent length (SVL) of 8 cm (3.1 in).

== Behavior ==
C. ingeri is arboreal.

== Diet ==
C. ingeri preys upon arthropods.

== Reproduction ==
C. ingeri is oviparous. Clutch size is two eggs. Each egg measures 12 mm x 9 mm (.47 in x .35 in).
