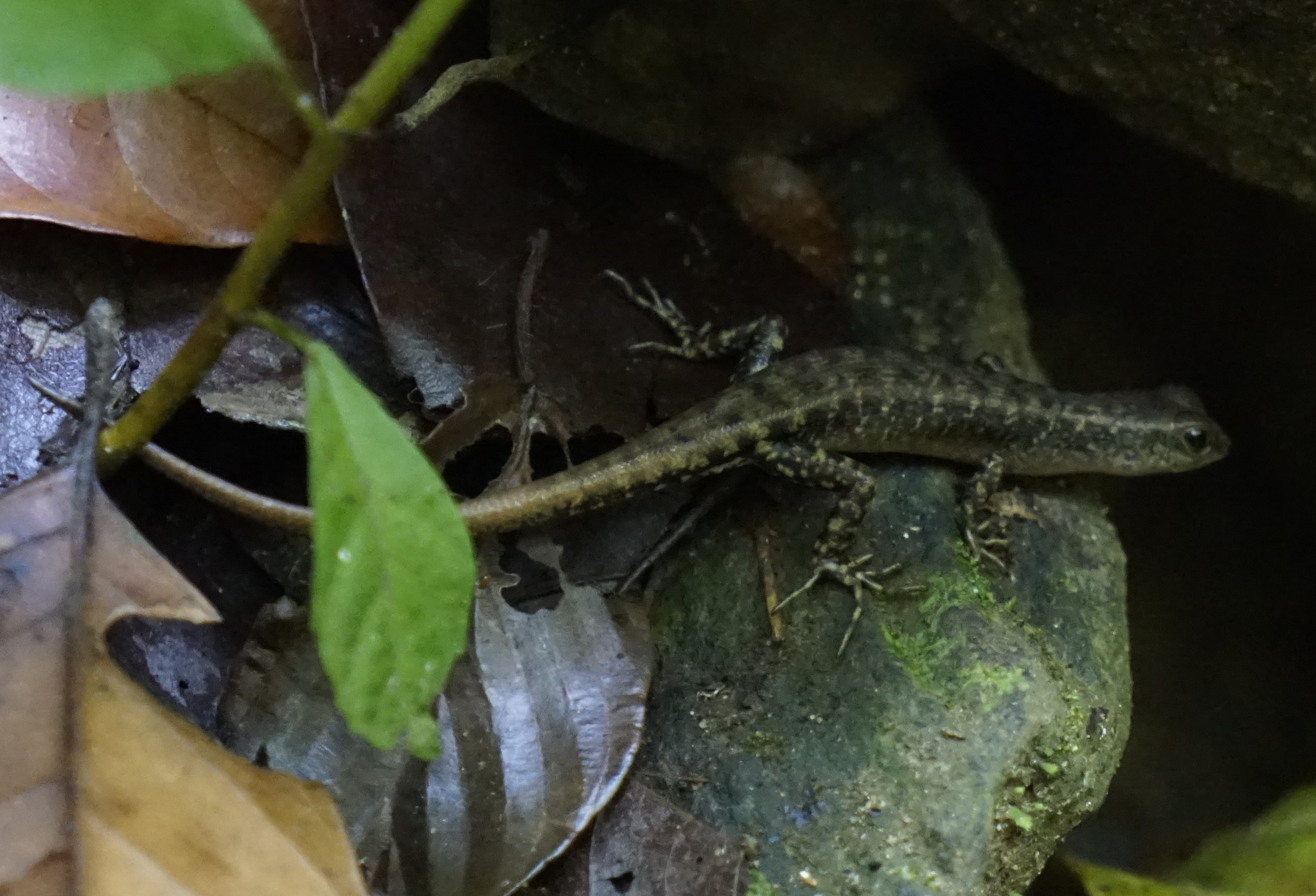

Conservation status
- Least Concern (IUCN 3.1)

Scientific classification
- Kingdom: Animalia
- Phylum: Chordata
- Class: Reptilia
- Order: Squamata
- Family: Scincidae
- Genus: Sphenomorphus
- Species: S. sabanus

Binomial name
- Sphenomorphus sabanus Inger, 1958

= Sphenomorphus sabanus =

Species of lizard

Sphenomorphus sabanus is a species of skink in the family Scincidae. It is known commonly as the Sabah slender skink.

== Authority ==
The holotype of this species was deposited at the Field Museum (Specimen No. 63671). It is an adult male collected in Sapagaya Forest Reserve in North Borneo on July 18, 1950 by Robert F. Inger. Paratypes were also deposited at the Field Museum. They include 32 specimens all collected from scattered localities in eastern North Borneo.

== Description ==
The Sabah slender skink is a slender, smooth-scaled, dark grey skink that lacks a black spot on the neck and a black lateral stripe. The ventral surface of these lizards is cream-colored. Males of the species have an orange flush on the flanks. Once preserved in alcohol, the color will range from brown to greyish brown.

== Habitat ==
The Sabah slender skink is a terrestrial lizard.
