= Nemacheilus tuberigum =

Conservation status
- Vulnerable (IUCN 3.1)

Scientific classification
- Kingdom: Animalia
- Phylum: Chordata
- Class: Actinopterygii
- Order: Cypriniformes
- Family: Nemacheilidae
- Genus: Nemacheilus
- Species: N. tuberigum

Binomial name
- Nemacheilus tuberigum Hadiaty & Siebert, 2001

Species of fish

Nemacheilus tuberigum is a species of stone loach endemic to Sumatra, Indonesia. It grows to 4.8 cm (1.9 in) SL.
