= Gastromyzon contractus =

Scientific classification
- Kingdom: Animalia
- Phylum: Chordata
- Class: Actinopterygii
- Order: Cypriniformes
- Family: Gastromyzontidae
- Genus: Gastromyzon
- Species: G. contractus

Binomial name
- Gastromyzon contractus T. R. Roberts, 1982

Species of fish

Gastromyzon contractus is a species of river loach in the genus Gastromyzon. It is endemic to the Kapuas River basin, western Borneo. It is a small fish growing to 3.7 cm (1.5 in) SL.
