= Arrow loach =

Conservation status
- Least Concern (IUCN 3.1)

Scientific classification
- Kingdom: Animalia
- Phylum: Chordata
- Class: Actinopterygii
- Order: Cypriniformes
- Family: Nemacheilidae
- Genus: Nemacheilus
- Species: N. masyae

Binomial name
- Nemacheilus masyae H. M. Smith, 1933

Synonyms
- Nemacheilus masyai (Smith, 1933)

Species of fish

The arrow loach (Nemacheilus masyae) is a species of ray-finned fish in the genus Nemacheilus.

== Information ==
Nemacheilus masyae or the "arrow loach", can be found in a freshwater environment within a benthopelagic depth habitat. They are native to a tropical climate. The average length of the Nemacheilus masyae as an unsexed male is about 13.5 centimetres (5.3 in). The body of this species is a light colour with dark splotches that can be found on its side. It can be identified by its elongated slim body. The arrow loach is known to be found in the areas of Asia, western Malaysia, Peninsular Thailand, the Meklong, part of the Mae Nam Chao Phraya basins, and the Mekong Basin. It is known to occur in shallow forest rivers and steams. They prefer a slow current of clear to slightly turbid water, with a muddy or sandy bottom. As far as their diet goes, this species feeds on insects, larvae, and invertebrates that live in the water. The females of this species are somewhat larger and of a bigger stature than the males are.

The specific name honours the scientific illustrator Luang Masya Chitrakarn, also known as Prasop Teeranunt (1896–1965), for his interest and zeal in the study of Thai fishes.

== Aquarium ==
Nemacheilus masyae has the ability to be an aquarium fish and is used for commercial use. It is considered to be an easily maintained fish. A tank size that is about 30 by 60 centimeters is the minimum size that is recommended for this species. The temperature should be about 23–26 °C (73–79 °F). The diet of Nemacheilus masyae consists of frozen food like Daphnia, Artemia, and bloodworm that will result in the best colouration and condition.
