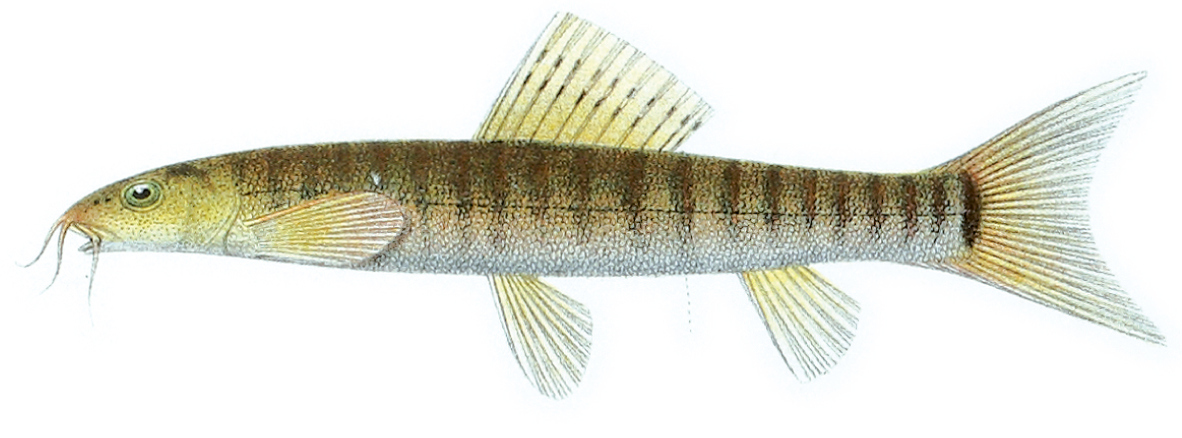
- Nemacheilus fasciatus
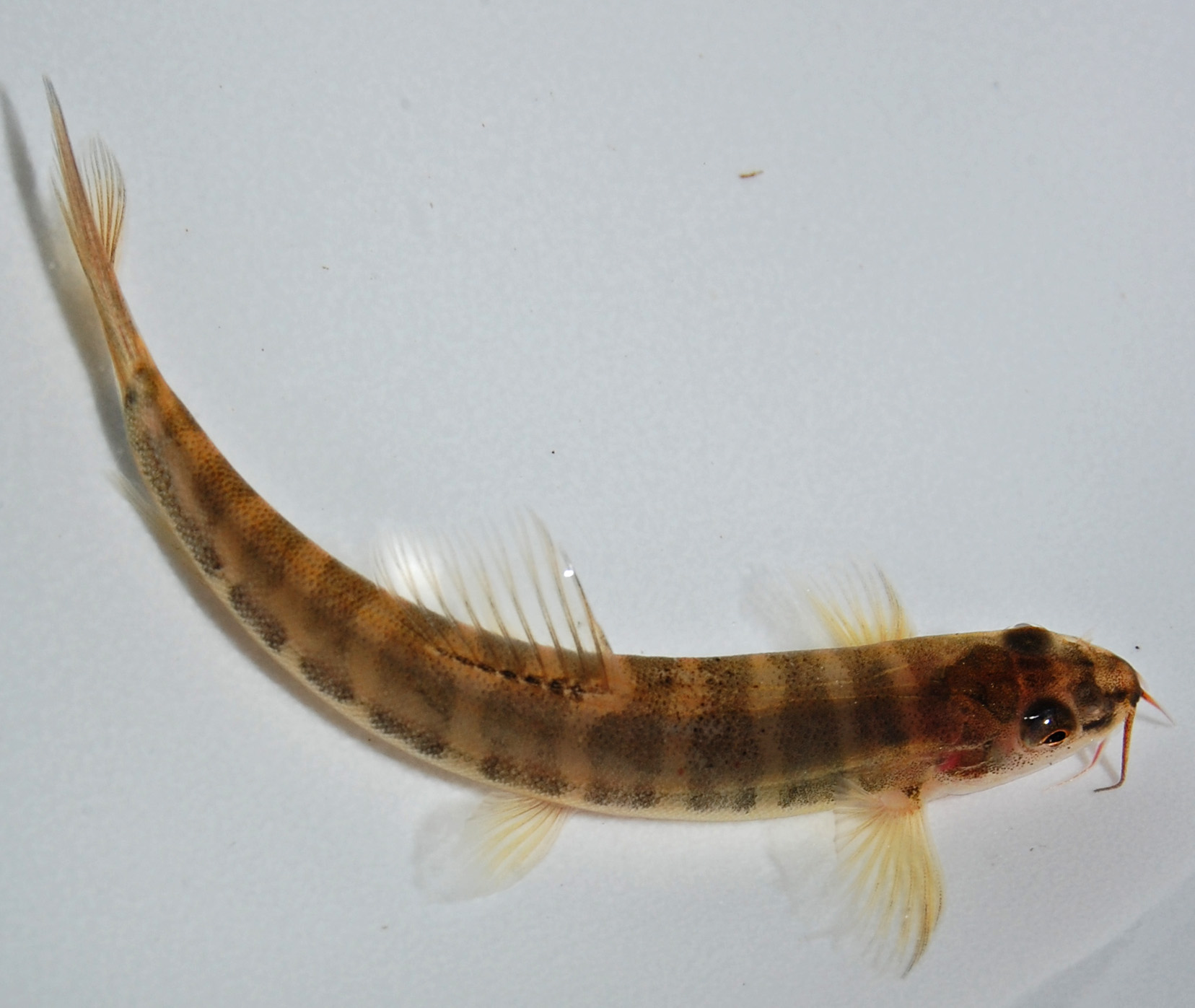
- Nemacheilus fasciatus top

Conservation status
- Least Concern (IUCN 3.1)

Scientific classification
- Kingdom: Animalia
- Phylum: Chordata
- Class: Actinopterygii
- Division: Teleostei
- Order: Cypriniformes
- Family: Nemacheilidae
- Genus: Nemacheilus
- Species: N. fasciatus

Binomial name
- Nemacheilus fasciatus (Valenciennes, 1846)

Synonyms
- Cobitis fasciata Valenciennes, 1846; Homaloptera fasciatus (Valenciennes, 1846); Noemacheilus fasciatus (Valenciennes, 1846)

= Barred loach =

Species of fish

The barred loach (Nemacheilus fasciatus) is a species of ray-finned fish in the genus Nemacheilus.

== Size ==
The maximum length is 7.4 centimetres (2.9 in), with a common length of 5.8 centimetres (2.3 in).

== Location ==
The barred loach can be found in fresh water in tropical climates in areas such as Sumatra and Java in Indonesia. It is found in mountain streams, and it prefers quiet and clear water.

== Feeding ==
The barred loach feeds on benthic organisms and detritus.
