= Robert F. Inger =

American herpetologist (1920–2019)

Robert Frederick Inger
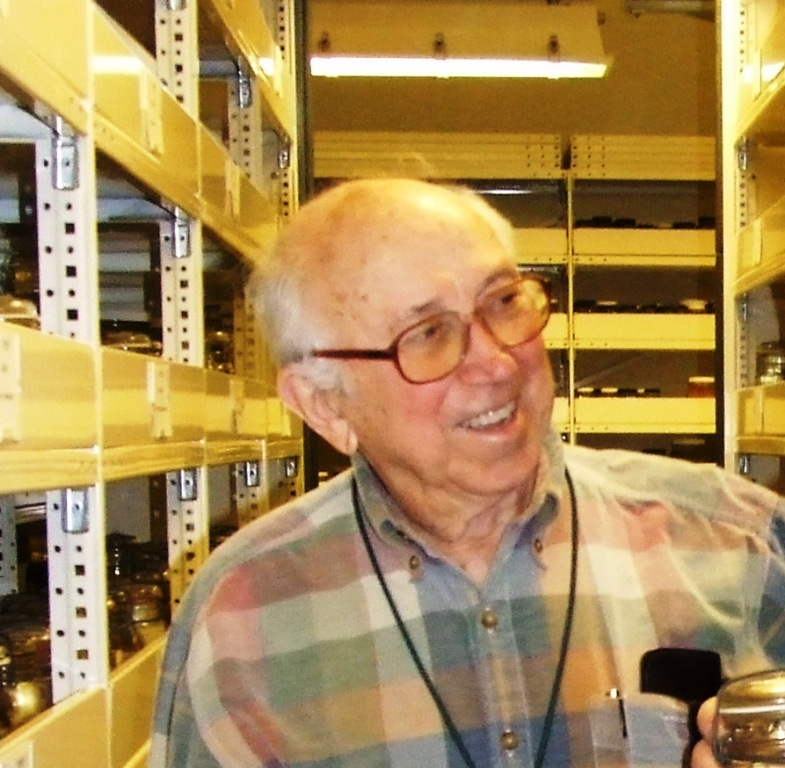
- Born: September 10, 1920; St. Louis, Missouri, U.S.
- Died: April 12, 2019 (aged 98); Chicago, Illinois, U.S.
- Education: University of Chicago
- Spouses: Mary Lee Ballew (1946–1985); Tan Fui Lian (1991–2019)
- Awards: Datuk (2007)
- Scientific career
- Fields: Biology, Herpetology
- Workplaces: Field Museum
- Notable students: Richard Wassersug
- Author abbrev. (zoology): R. F. Inger

Robert Frederick Inger (September 10, 1920 – April 12, 2019) was an American herpetologist. During his lifetime, he wrote numerous books and publications about herpetology. He was also the curator for amphibians and reptiles at the Field Museum in Chicago, Illinois.

== Family ==
Robert Inger was the son of Jacob Inger and Anna Bourd. In 1946 he married Mary Lee Ballew (b. 1918) who died of cancer in 1985. In 1991 he married Tan Fui Lian (b. 1951).

== Education ==
Inger's high school biology teacher was Julian Steyermark, who became curator of botany at the Field Museum. Steyermark was the role model that led Inger to the Field Museum to volunteer, where he was interviewed by Karl P. Schmidt, Dwight Davis, and Clifford H. Pope. As a result of this volunteer work, Inger had authored or coauthored five publications before graduating from high school. In 1942, Inger received a Bachelor of Science from the University of Chicago. After first being turned down due to poor eyesight, he was drafted into the Army Corps of Engineers and placed in a unit of General Patton's Army in France and Germany making maps from the ground. He was discharged in 1945 near St. Louis. Inger returned to the University of Chicago for graduate work, with his principal mentor being Karl P. Schmidt, who suggested that he do his dissertation on the systematics and zoogeography of the Philippine Amphibia (Inger, 1954), using the extensive collection at the Field Museum.

== Career ==
Inger's herpetology career began with volunteer work at the Field Museum, where he was eventually hired as assistant curator of fishes in 1949. He then succeeded Clifford Pope as curator of amphibians and reptiles in 1954. He retired from this position in September 1994; however, he continued lab and field work in the museum as curator emeritus.

Inger served as president of the Society of Systematic Zoology in 1971, president of American Society of Ichthyology and Herpetology in 1974, and president of the Herpetologists' League in 1982–1983. He was an editor for Evolution and the American Midland Naturalist and a sectional editor (herpetology) for Copeia. He also served on the board of the Illinois Chapter of The Nature Conservancy. In January 2007 Yang di-Pertua Negeri Tun Abang Muhammad Salahuddin Abang Barieng conferred on Inger the honorary Panglima Setia Bintang Sarawak (PSBS), which carries the title Datuk. This honor was conferred in recognition of Inger's 50 years of field work in Borneo describing, cataloguing and publishing on the taxonomy and ecology of herpetofauna in Sarawak.

On April 12, 2019, Inger died at the age of 98.

== Taxa ==
=== Taxa named for Robert F. Inger ===
Over 40 species are named in his honor:

==== Reptiles ====
- Calamaria ingeri
- Cyrtodactylus ingeri
- Dibamus ingeri
- Erythrolamprus ingeri
- Phyllodactylus tuberculosus ingeri

==== Amphibians ====
- Ameerega ingeri
- Ingerana
- Ingerophrynus
- Limnonectes ingeri
- Pelophryne ingeri
- Philautus ingeri
- Ptychadena ingeri
- Raorchestes bobingeri
- Strabomantis ingeri

=== Fishes ===
- Gastromyzon ingeri
- Halieutopsis ingerorum
- Osteochilus ingeri
- Stenogobius ingeri

=== Species described by Robert F. Inger ===
Over 75 species have been described by him.

Species	Authority	Reference
Leptopelis oryi	Inger, 1968	
Leptopelis parvus	Schmidt & Inger, 1959	
Ansonia albomaculata	Inger, 1960	
Amietophrynus cristiglans	Inger & Menzies, 1961	PDF fulltext
Tetraodon kretamensis	Inger, 1953	fulltext
Sphenomorphus sabanus	Inger, 1958	fulltext

== Publications ==
He has written 8 books and more than 130 peer-reviewed articles.

=== Books ===
- 1957 Living Reptiles of the World with Karl Patterson Schmidt
- 1966 The Reptiles
- 1989 The Frogs of Sabah with R. B. Stuebing
- 1996 The Natural History of Amphibians and Reptiles in Sabah with Tan Fui Lian
- 1997 A Field Guide to the Frogs of Borneo with R. B. Stuebing
- 1999 A Field Guide to the Snakes of Borneo with R. B. Stuebing
- 2005 A Field Guide to the Frogs of Borneo 2nd Edition with R. B. Stuebing
- 2010 Natural History Of Amphibians And Reptiles In Sabah 2nd Edition with Tan Fui Lian

=== Other publications ===
- 1942. Scale reduction in snakes. Copeia 1942:163–170 with P. J. Clark
- 1942. Scale reduction in certain non-colubrid snakes. Copeia 1942:230–232 with P. J. Clark
- 1942. Differential selection of variant juvenile snakes. Amer. Nat. 76:527–528.
- 1943. Partition of the genus Coluber. Copeia 1943:141–145. with P. J. Clark
- 1943. Further notes on differential selection of variant juvenile snakes. Amer. Nat. 77:87–90.
- 1946. Restriction of the type locality of Thamnophis sirtalis. Copeia 1946:254.
- 1947. Preliminary survey of the amphibians of the Riu Kiu Islands. Fieldiana:Zool. 32:297–352. Biodiversity Heritage Library fulltext
- 1948. The systematic status of the crocodile Osteoblepharon osborni. Copeia 1948:15–19.
- 1949. Notes on a collection of fresh-water fishes from Trinidad. Copeia 1949: 300.
- 1950. Distribution and speciation of amphibians of the Riu Kiu Islands. Amer. Nat. 84:95–115.
- 1951. Amphibians and reptiles of the Hopkins-Branner expedition to Brazil. Fieldiana:Zool. 31:439–465. Biodiversity Heritage Library fulltext
- 1953. A new fish from North Borneo: genus Tetraodon. Fieldiana:Zool. 34:149–152. Biodiversity Heritage Library fulltext
- 1954. Systematics and zoogeographyof Philippine Amphibia. Fieldiana:Zool.33:183–531
- 1954. On a collection of amphibians from Mount Kinabalu, North Borneo. J. Washington Acad. Sci. 44:250–251.
- 1955. Ecological notes on the fis fauna of a coastal drainage of North Borneo. Fieldiana:Zool. 32:47–90.
- 1955. Notes on snakes of the genus Calamaria. Fieldiana:Zool. 37:167–209. with Hymen Marx
- 1955. a revision of the fishes of the genus Plesiops Cuvier. Pacific Sci. 9:259–276.
- 1956. Some amphibians from the lowlands of North Borneo. Fieldiana:Zool. 34:389–424.
- 1956. Notes on a collection of fishes from southeastern Venezuela. Fieldiana:Zool. 34:425–440.
- 1956. Morphology and development of the vocal sac apparatus in the African frog Rana (Ptychadena) porossima Steindachner. J. Morph. 99:57–72.
- 1956. Morphology and seasonal development of sex characters in two sympatric African toads. J. Morph. 99:549–574 with B. Greenberg
- 1957. Report on a collection of marine fishes from North Borneo. Fieldiana:Zool. 36:341–405.
- 1957. Ecological aspects of the origins of the tetrapods. Evol. 11:373–376.
- 1957. The cave, spring, and swamp fishes of the family Amblyopsidae of central and eastern United States. Amer. Midl. Nat. 58:232–256 with L. P. Woods
- 1958. A note on the Philippine frogs related to Rana macrodon. Fieldiana:Zool. 39:253–255.
- 1958. Three new skinks related to Sphenomorphus variegates (Peters). Fieldiana:Zool. 39:257–268. Biodiversity Heritage Library fulltext
- 1958. The vocal sac of the Colorado River toad Bufo alvarius (Girard). Texas J. Sci. 10:319–324.
- 1958. Comments on the definition of genera. Evol 12:370–384.
- 1958. A new gecko of the genus Cyrtodactylus, with a key to the species from Borneo and the Philippine Islands. Sarawak Mus. J. 8:261–264.
- 1958. Notes on fishes of the genus Brachygobius. Fieldiana:Zool. 39:107–117.
- 1958. Notes on the Bornean glass snake. Sarawak Mus. J. 8:479–481.
- 1958. A new toad from Sarawak. Sarawak Mus. J. 8:476–478.
- 1959. Temperature responses and ecological relations of two Bornean lizards. Ecol. 40:127–136.
- 1959. Amphibians exclusive of the genera Afrixalus and Hyperolius. Exploration du Parc national de l'Upemba, Inst. Parc Nat. Congo Belge, Fasc. 56, 264 pp. with K. P. Schmidt
- 1959. Amphibia. South African Animal Life 6:510–553.
- 1959. New species of fresh-water catfishes from North Borneo. Fieldiana:Zool. 39:279–296.
- 1960. Notes on toads of the genus Pelophryne. Fieldiana:Zool. 39:415–418.
- 1960. A review of the agamid lizards of the genus Phoxophrys Hubrecht. Copeia 1960:221–225.
- 1960. A review of the Oriental toads of the genus Ansonia. Fieldiana:Zool. 39:473–503.
- 1961. A new pelobatid frog of the genus Megophrys from Hong Kong. Fieldiana:Zool. 39:533–538. with J. D. Romer
- 1961. Notes on two New Guinean lizards of the genus Sphenomorphus. Fieldiana:Zool. 39:539–542.
- 1961. The food of amphibians. Exploration du Parc national de l'Upemba, Inst. Parc Nat. du Congo et Ruanda-Urundi, Fasc. 64, 86 pp. with H. Marx
- 1961. The Bornean cyprinid fishes of the genus Gastromyzon Günther. Copeia 1961:166–176.
- 1961. A new species of toad (Bufo) from Sierra Leone. Fieldiana:Zool. 39:589–594.PDF fulltext
- 1961. Problems in the application of the subspecies concept in vertebrate taxonomy. Univ. Texas Symposium on Vertebrate Taxonomy, pp. 262–285.
- 1961. A new colubrid snake of the genus Pseudorabdion from Sumatra. Fieldiana:Zool. 44:45–47. with A. E. Leviton
- 1961. A new cave dwelling lizard of the genus Cyrtodactylus. Sarawak Mus. J. 10:274–276. with F. W. King
- 1962. The fresh-water fishes of North Borneo. Fieldiana:Zool. 45:1–268. with Chin P.-K.
- 1962. Variation of hemipenis and cloaca in the colubrid snake, Calamaria lumbricoidea. Syst. Zool. 11:32–38. with H. Marx
- 1962. On the terrestrial origin of frogs. Copeia 1962:835–836.
- 1963. The annual reproductive pattern of the frog Rana erythraea in Sarawak. Phys. Zool. 36:21–33. with B. Greenberg
- 1964. The taxonomic status of the frog Cornufer dorsalis A Duméril. Copeia 1964:450–451. with W. C. Brown
- 1964. Two new species of frogs from Borneo. Fieldiana:Zool. 44:151–159.
- 1965. The systematics and evolution of the Oriental colubrid snakes of the Genus Calamaria. Fieldiana:Zool. 49:1–304. with H. Marx
- 1965. New species of scincid lizards of the genus Sphenomorphus from Sarawak. Israel J. Zool. 14:134–140. with W. Hosmer
- 1966. The taxonomic status of Bornean snakes of the genus Pseudorabdion Jan and of the nominal genus Idiopholis Mocquard. Proc. California Acad. Sci. 34:307–314. with A. E. Leviton
- 1966. The systematics and zoogeography of the Amphibia of Borneo. Fieldiana:Zoology 33:183–531.
- 1966. Ecological and competitive relations among three species of frogs (genus Rana). Ecol. 47:746–759. with B. Greenberg
- 1966. Annual reproductive patterns of lizards from a Bornean rain forest. Ecol. 47:1007–1021. with B. Greenberg
- 1967. The development of a phylogeny of frogs. Evol. 21:369–384.
- 1967. A new colubrid snake of the genus Stegonotus from Borneo. Fieldiana:Zool. 51:77–83.
- 1968. Annual reproduction and clutch size in rain forest frogs from Sarawak. Copeia 1968:602–606. with J. P. Bacon
- 1968. On the diversity of reptile and amphibian species in a Bornean rain forest. Amer. Nat. 102:497–515. with M. Lloyd & F. W. King
- 1968. Amphibia. Exploration du Parc Nat. de la Garamba, Fasc. 52, 190 pp.
- 1969. Organization of communities of frogs along small rain forest streams in Sarawak. J. Animal Ecol. 38:123–148.
- 1970. A new species of frog of the genus Rana from Thailand. Fieldiana:Zool. 51:169–174.
- 1972. Bufo from Eurasia. In Evolution in the genus Bufo. Ed. W. F. Blair, Univ. Texas Press, pp. 102–118, 357-360.
- 1973. Numerical taxonomy. Caldasia 11:72–88.
- 1974. Genetic variation and population ecology of some Southeast Asian frogs of the genera Bufo and Rana. Genetics 12:121–145. with H. K. and H. H. Voris
- 1977. Organization of contiguous communities of amphibians and reptiles in Thailand. Ecol. Monogr. 47:229–253. with R. K. Colwell
- 1979. Abundances of amphibians and reptiles in tropical forests of Southeast Asia. Trans 6th Aberdeen-Hull Symposium on Malesian Ecology. Ed. A. G. Marshall. Univ. Hull Dept. Geography, Misc. Ser., No. 22, pp. 92–110.
- 1980. Species of the scincid genus Dasia Gray. Fieldiana:Zool. (n.s.), no. 3, 11 pp. with W. C. Brown
- 1980. Relative abundances of frogs and lizards in forest of Southeast Asia. Biotropica 12:14–22.
- 1980. Densities of floor-dwelling frogs and lizards in lowland forests of Southeast Asia and Central America. Amer. Nat. 115:761–770.
- 1980. New species of narrow-mouth frogs (genus Microhyla) from Borneo. Sarawak Mus. J. 27:311–322. with K. J. Frogner
- 1981. Adaptation for life in tree holes by rhacophorid tadpoles from Thailand. J. Herpetology 15:41–52. with R. J. Wassersug & K. J. Frogner
- 1983. Larvae of Southeast Asian species of Leptobrachium and Leptobrachella (Anura: Pelobaatidae). in Advances in Herpetology and Evolutionary Biology. eds. Rhodin & Miyata, pp. 13–32.
- 1983. Morphological and ecological variation in the flying lizards (genus Draco). Fieldiana:Zool. (n.s.) no. 18, 35 pp.
- 1983. Variation in Bornean frogs of the Amolops jerboa species group, with description of two new species. Fieldiana:Zool. (n.s.), no. 19, 13 pp. with P. Gritis
- 1984. An undescribed species of gekkonid lizard (Cnemaspis) from India with comments on the status of C. tropidogaster. Herpetologica 40:149–154. with H. Marx & M. Koshy
- 1984. A report on a collection of amphibians and reptiles from Ponmudi, Kerala, South India. J. Bombay Nat. Hist. Sc. 81:551–570. with H. B. Shaffer, M. Koshy & R. Bakde
- 1985. Tadpoles of the forested regions of Borneo. Fieldiana:Zool. (n.s.), No. 22, 89 pp.
- 1985. A key to the frogs of Sarawak. Sarawak Mus. J. 34:161–182. with H. K. Voris & P. Walker
- 1986. Larval transport in a Bornean ranid frog. Copeia 1986:523–525. with H. K. Voris & P. Walker
- 1986. Organization of a community of tadpoles in rain forest streams in Borneo. J. Tropical Ecol. 2:193–205. with H. K. Voris & K. J. Frogner
- 1986. Diets of tadpoles living in a Bornean rain forest. Alytes 5:153–164.
- 1987. Ecological structure of a herpetological assemblage in South India Amphibia-Reptilia 8:189–202. with H. B. Shaffer, M. Koshy & R. Bakde
- 1987. An overview of the amphibian fauna of India. J. Bombay Nat Hist. Soc. 83 (Supplement): 135–146. with S. K. Dutta
- 1988. Taxonomic and ecological relations of Bornean stream toads allied to Ansonia leptopus (Günther) (anura:Bufonidae). Malayan Nat. J. 41:461–471. with J. Dring
- 1988. Taxonomic status and reproductive biology of Bornean tadpole-carrying frogs. Copeia 1988:1060–1062.
- 1989. Developmental differences in visceral morphology of megophryine pelobatid tadpoles in relation to their body form and mode of life. Biol. J. Linnaean Soc. 38:369–388. with E. Nodzenski & R. J. Wassersug
- 1989. Ecological and geographic distribution of the amphibians of Sichuan, China. Copeia 1989:549–557. with E. Zhao & G. Wu
- 1989. Four new species of frogs from Borneo. Malayan Nat. J. 42:229–243.
- 1989. A new species of gasteromyzontine fish, Gastromyzon danumensis from Sabah, Borneo. Malayan Nat. J. 43:53–58. with Chin P.-K.
- 1990. A centrolenid-like anuran larva from Southeast Asia. Zool. Sci. 7:557–561. with R. J. Wassersug
- 1990. Report on a collection of amphibians and reptiles from Sichuan, China. Fieldiana:Zool. (n.s.), no. 58, 24 pp. with E. Zhao, H. B. Shaffer & G. Wu
- 1990. Recently discovered and newly assigned frog larvae (Ranidae and Rhacophoridae) from Borneo. Raffles Bull. Zool. 38:3–9. with Tan F.-L.
- 1991. A new species of frog of the genus Leptobrachella Smith (Anura:Pelobatidae), with a key to the species from Borneo. Raffles Bull. Zool. 39:99–103. with R. B. Stuebing
- 1991. Uncoupling of related structural changes in metamorphosing torrentdwelling tadpoles. Copeia 1990:1047–1054. with E. Nodzenski
- 1992. Variation of apomorphic characters in the stream-dwelling tadpoles of the bufonid genus Ansonia (Amphibia: Anura). Zool. J. Linnaean Soc. 105:225–237.
- 1992. A biphasic feeding system in a stream-dwelling larval form of Rhacophorus from Borneo. Copeia 1992:887–890.
- 1992. Comparative ecology of voiced and voiceless Bornean frogs. J. Herpetology 26:482–490. with S. B. Emerson
- 1993. The montane amphibian fauna of northwestern Borneo. Malayan Nat. J. 46:41–51. with R. B. Stuebing
- 1993. A new frog of the genus Oreolalax (Pelobatidae) from Sichuan, China. J. Herpetology 27:410–413. with G. F. Wu, E. Zhao & H. B. Shaffer
- 1993. A comparison of amphibian communities through time and from place to place. Journal of Tropical Ecology. with H. K. Voris
- 1994. Morphological variation and ecological distribution of co-occurring larval forms of Oreolalax (Anura: Pelobatidae). Amphibia-Reptilia 15:109–121. with G. F. Wu, H. B. Shaffer & E. Zhao
- 1994. First record of the lizard genus Pseudocalotes (Lacertilia: Agamidae) in Borneo, with description of a new species. Raffles Bull. Zool. 42:961–965. with R. B. Stuebing
- 1995. New species and new records of anurans from Borneo. Raffles Bull. Zool. 43:115–131. with R. B. Stuebing & Tan F.-L.
- 1995. Frog abundance along streams in Bornean forests. Conserv. Biol. 9:679–684. with H. K. Voris
- 1996. Commentary on a proposed classification of the Family Ranidae. Herpetologica 52:241–246.
- 1996. Two new species of frogs from southeastern Sarawak. Raffles Bull. Zool. 44:543–549. with R. B. Stuebing
- 1996. Frogs and toads of Kinabalu. in Kinabalu Summit of Borneo. eds. K. M. Wong & A Phillipps, pp. 353–367. with R. B. Stuebing & Tan F.-L.
- 1996. Checklist of the frogs of Borneo. Raffles Bull. Zool. 44:551–574. with Tan F.-L.
- 1996. New species of ranid frogs (Amphibia:Anura) from Central Kalimantan, Borneo. Raffles Bull. Zool. 44:363–369. with Boeadi & A. Taufik
- 1997 A new species of Leptolalax (Anura: Megophryidae) from Borneo. Asiatic Herp. Research 7:48–50. with M. Lakim, A. Buin, & P Yambun
- 1997. A new species of ranid frog from Thailand, with comments on Rana livida (Blyth). Nat. Hist. Bull. Siam Soc. 45:65–70. with T. Chan-ard
- 1998. A new species of ranid frog from Laos. Raffles Bull. Zool. 46:29–34. with M. Kottelat
- 1998. Rediscovery of the agamid lizard Calotes kinabaluensis de Grijs (Lacertilia:Agamidae) in Borneo, with notes on its habitat. Herp. Rev. 29:143–144. with M. Lakim
- 1998. Additional records on two rare snakes from Borneo, with the confirmation of Trimeresurus malcolmi Loveridge as a distinct species. Raffles Bull. Zool. 46:325–328.
- 1999. Frogs of Vietnam: a report on new collections. Fieldiana Zool. (n.s.), no. 92, 46 pp. with N. Orlov & I. Darevsky PDF fulltext
- 1999. Distribution of amphibians of Southern Asia and adjacent islands. in Patterns of distribution of amphibians. ed.W. E. Duellman. Johns Hopkins Univ. Press. pp. 445–482.
- 2000. Notes on the Bornean treefrog Philautus ingeri Dring. Sabah Mus. J. 1:9–12. with A. Wong
- 2001. Molecular systematics and biogeography of the fanged frogs of Southeast Asia. Mol. Phylog. Evol. 16:131–142. with S. B. Emerson & D. T. Iskandar
- 2002. The frog fauna of three parks in Sabah, Malaysia—Kinabalu Park, Crocker Range Park, and Tawau Hills Park. Sabah Parks Nat. J. 3:7–28. with Tan F.-L. & P. Yambun
- 2001. The biogeographical relations of the frogs and snakes of Sundaland. J. Biogeogr. 28:863–889. with H. K. Voris
- 2001. A new species of toad of the genus Ansonia (Anura: Bufonidae) from Borneo. Raffles Bull. Zool. 49:35–38. with Tan F.-L. & P. Yambun
- 2003. New species of the lizard genus Sphenomorphus (Lacertilia: Scincidae) with notes on ecological and geographic distribution of species in Sabah, Malaysia. Raffles Bull. Zool. 49:181–190. with Tan F.-L., M. Lakim & P. Yambun
- 2003. Sampling biodiversity in Bornean frogs. Nat. Hist. J. Chulalongkorn Univ. 3:9–15.
- 2005. A collection of amphibians from West Sumatra, with description of a new species of Megophrys (Amphibia: Anura). Raffles Bull. Zool. 53: 133–142. with D. T. Iskandar
- 2005. The frog fauna of the Indo-Malayan region as it applies to Wallace's Line. in Wallace in Sarawak. eds. A. A. Tuen & I. Das, pp. 82–90.
- 2006. High level of cryptic species diversity revealed by sympatric lineages of Southeast Asian forest frogs. Biology Letters (2006) 2:470–474. with B. L. Stuart & H. K. Voris
- 2006. The tadpole of Rana glandulosa Boulenger (Anura:Ranidae). Raffles Bull. Zool. 54:465–467.
- 2009. Systematics of a widespread Southeast Asian frog, Rana chalconota (Amphibia: Anura: Ranidae). Zool. J. Linnean Soc. 155:123–147.
- 2009. New species and new records of Bornean frogs (Amphibia: Anura). Raffles Bull. Zool. 57:527–535.
