= Heok Hui Tan =

Singaporean professor and ichthyologist

- Scientific career
- Fields: ichthyology
- Institutions: National University of Singapore

Heok Hui Tan is a Singaporean ichthyologist at the Lee Kong Chian Natural History Museum of the National University of Singapore. Dr. Tan's main interest lies in the systematics of Southeast Asian freshwater fishes, encompassing taxonomy, ecology and biogeography. His primary areas of research focus on neglected and de novo habitats such as peat swamp forests, swamp forests, and rapids.

As of 2018, Tan has authored two species of Osphronemidae (Luciocephalus aura and Betta pi).

== Publications (selection) ==
- The Borneo Suckers: Revision of the Torrent Loaches of Borneo (Balitoridae, Gastromyzon, Neogastromyzon) (Natural History Publications (Borneo): 2006) ISBN 9838121053, 9789838121057
- Britz, R., Kottelat. M, & Tan, H.H. 2011. Fangfangia spinicleithralis, a new genus and species of miniature cyprinid fish from the peat swamp forests of Borneo (Teleostei: Cyprinidae). Ichthyological Exploration of Freshwaters 22(4): 327–335. (PDF)

Tan has (co-)authored many publications. Also see the list of publications in the external links.

== See also ==
- Category:Taxa named by Heok Hui Tan
