= Rainer Froese =

German marine ecologist (born 1950)

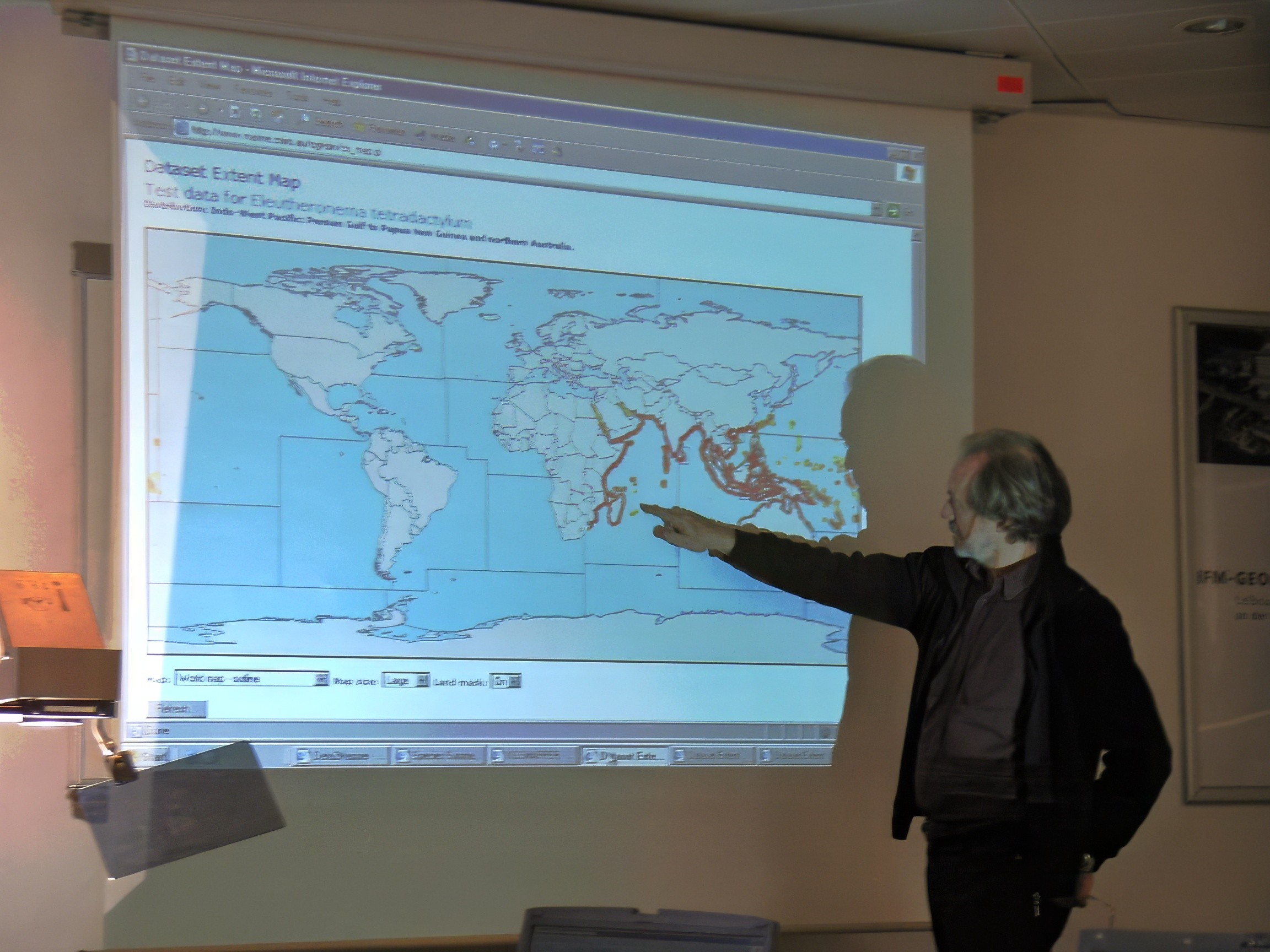
- Rainer Froese, AquaMaps project coordinator, discusses a species modelled distribution at a project workshop in Kiel 2005
- Born: 25 August 1950 (age 76); Wismar, East Germany (now Germany)
- Education: University of Hamburg (PhD); University of Kiel (MSc)
- Known for: Developing and coordinating FishBase
- Awards: Pew Fellow in Marine Conservation
- Scientific career
- Fields: Marine ecology
- Workplaces: Leibniz Institute of Marine Sciences (IFM-GEOMAR)

Rainer Froese (born 25 August 1950 in Wismar, East Germany) is a senior scientist at the Helmholtz Center for Ocean Research (GEOMAR) in Kiel, formerly the Leibniz Institute of Marine Sciences (IFM-GEOMAR), and a Pew Fellow in Marine Conservation. He obtained an MSc in Biology in 1985 at the University of Kiel and a PhD in Biology in 1990 from the University of Hamburg. Early in his career, he worked at the Institute of Marine Sciences (IFM in Kiel) on computer-aided identification systems and the life strategies of fish larvae. His current research interests include fish information systems, marine biodiversity, marine biogeography, and the population dynamics of fisheries and large marine ecosystems.

Froese is best known for his work developing and maintaining FishBase, a large and widely accessed online information system on fish. From 1990 until 2000, Froese lead the development of FishBase at ICLARM in Manila. Since 2000, he has coordinated the large international consortium that now oversees FishBase. Its searchable database contains 34,000 fish species and the site receives over 30 million views each month. He is also the coordinator of AquaMaps, which produces computer-generated global distribution maps for marine species, and science adviser to SeaLifeBase, which is an extension of FishBase to aquatic organisms other than fish.

Froese has authored or co-authored over 100 scientific publications. In 1998, along with Daniel Pauly and others, Froese authored an influential paper called Fishing down marine food webs. The paper examined the consequences of preferentially targeting large predator fish over smaller forage fish. As a result, the fishing industry has been "fishing down the food web", and the mean trophic level in the oceans has progressively decreased. More recently, in a 2011 letter to Nature, he stated that the European Common Fisheries Policy "consistently gets to overrule scientific advice and drive fish stocks to the brink of collapse. Without massive subsidies, European fisheries would be bankrupt: the cost of hunting the few remaining fish would exceed the income from selling the catch."

== Some publications ==
- Froese R, Stern-Pirlot A, Winker H and Gascuel D (2008) "Size matters: How single-species management can contribute to ecosystem-based fisheries management" Fisheries Research, 92(2–3): 231–241.
- Froese R (2006) "Cube law, condition factor and weight-length relationships: history, meta-analysis and recommendations" Journal of Applied Ichthyology, 22(4): 241–253. doi:10.1111/j.1439-0426.2006.00805.x
- Froese R, Piatkowski U, Garthe S and Pauly D (2005) "Trophic signatures of marine organisms in the Mediterranean as compared with other ecosystems". Belgian Journal of Zoology 134: 31–36.
- Froese R (2004) "Keep it simple: three indicators to deal with overfishing" Fish and Fisheries, 5(1): 86–91.
- Froese R and Sampang A (2004) "Taxonomy and biology of seamount fishes" Fisheries Centre, Research Reports, 12(5): 25–31.
- Froese R, Lloris D and Opitz S (2004) "The need to make scientific data publicly available – concerns and possible solutions" Pages 268–271. In: MLD Palomares, B Samb, T Diouf, JM Vakily and D Pauly (eds) Fish Biodiversity: Local studies as basis for global inferences. ACP-EU Fisheries Research Report 14, 283 p.
- Froese R, Binohlan C (2003) "Simple methods to obtain preliminary growth estimates for fishes" Applied Ichthyology, 19: 376–379.
- Froese R, Bisby FA and Wilson KL (eds) (2003) Species 2000 & ITIS catalogue of life 2003: indexing the world's known species CD-ROM.
- Froese R and Kesner-Reyes K (2002) "Impact of fishing on the abundance of marine species" ICES CM, (12).
- Froese R and Binohlan C (2000) "Empirical relationships to estimate asymptotic length, length at first maturity and length at maximum yield per recruit in fishes, with a simple method to evaluate length frequency data" Journal of Fish Biology, 56: 758–773.
- Froese R and Palomares M (2000) "Growth, natural mortality, length-weight relationship, maximum length and length-at-first-maturity of the coelacanth Latimeria chalumnae" Environ. Biol. Fish. 58: 45–52
- Pauly D, Christensen V, Froese R and Palomares M (2000) "Fishing Down Aquatic Food Webs" American Scientist, 88(1): 46–51.
- Froese R and Pauly D (eds) (2000) FishBase: 2000: concepts, design and data sources, ICLARM (344 pp). 4 CD-ROMs
- Froese R (1999) "The good, the bad, and the ugly: A critical look at species and their institutions from a user's perspective" Reviews in Fish Biology and Fisheries, 9: 375–378.
- Froese R and Torres A (1999) "Fishes under threat: An analysis of the fishes in the 1996 IUCN Red List" Towards policies for conservation and sustainable use of aquatic genetic resources, ICLARM Conf. Proc., 59: 277f.
- Froese R, Bailly N, Coronado GU, Pruvost P, Reyes R and Hureau JC (1999) "A new procedure to clean up fish collection databases" pp. 697–7. Proceedings of the 5th Indo-Pacific Fisheries Conference, Nouméa, New Caledonia, B Seret and JY Sire, Society of French Ichthyologists, Paris.
- Froese R (1996) "A data-rich approach to assess biodiversity" In: Biodiversity in Asia: challenges and opportunities for the scientific community, JA McNeely and S Somchevita (eds). Office of Environmental Policy and Planning, Ministry of Science, Technology and Environment, Bangkok, pp. 127–136.
- Full list of publications

== See also ==
- Environmental niche modelling
- Biodiversity informatics
