= Parasewellia =

Scientific classification (disputed)
- Kingdom: Animalia
- Phylum: Chordata
- Class: Actinopterygii
- Order: Cypriniformes
- Family: Gastromyzontidae
- Genus: Parasewellia; V. H. Nguyễn & H. D. Nguyễn, 2005

Genus of fish

Parasewellia is a small genus of hillstream loaches endemic to Vietnam. Described in a single work by Nguyen & Nguyen, the validity of claims, as of 2012, cannot be properly analyzed due to poor descriptions and low quality of illustrations. Due to extremely restricted ranges it is possible that multiple claimed species represent a single one. Maurice Kottelat places them under Sewellia.

== Species ==
There are currently three recognized species in this genus:

- Parasewellia monolobata V. H. Nguyễn & H. D. Nguyễn, 2005
- Parasewellia polylobata V. H. Nguyễn & H. D. Nguyễn, 2005
- Parasewellia tetralobata V. H. Nguyễn & H. D. Nguyễn, 2005
