= Barbucca heokhuii =

Scientific classification
- Kingdom: Animalia
- Phylum: Chordata
- Class: Actinopterygii
- Order: Cypriniformes
- Family: Barbuccidae
- Genus: Barbucca
- Species: B. heokhuii

Binomial name
- Barbucca heokhuii Kottelat, 2025

Species of ray-finned fish

Barbucca heokhuii is a miniature loach found in the Rungan watershed of Central Borneo. The largest known specimen has a length of 21.5 mm (0.85 in), making it the smallest known species of Barbucca. Its population has not been evaluated. It differentiates itself from other species in the Barbucca genus by having a smaller size, different patterns, an incomplete lateral line and more. It coexists with Barbucca diabolica.

Sexual dimorphism had not been recorded in the family Barbuccidae before, however male specimens of B. heokhuii have been described as having differing widths of their pectoral fin rays, and tiny tubercles (assumed to be a male trait), compared to the females who's rays have similar widths.

== Etymology ==
Its name, heokhuii, is named after Tan Heok Hui, for his work regarding South East Asian fish; particularly with loaches in Borneo.
