= Sewellia monolobata =

Scientific classification
- Kingdom: Animalia
- Phylum: Chordata
- Class: Actinopterygii
- Division: Teleostei
- Order: Cypriniformes
- Family: Gastromyzontidae
- Genus: Sewellia
- Species: S. monolobata

Binomial name
- Sewellia monolobata (H. D. Nguyễn & V. H. Nguyễn, 2005)

Synonyms
- Paraswellia monoloata H. D. Nguyễn & V. H. Nguyễn, 2006; Parasewellia polylobata H. D. Nguyễn & V. H. Nguyễn, 2006

Species of fish

Sewellia monolobata is a species of freshwater ray-finned fish belonging to the family Gastromyzontidae, commonly called the hillstream loaches, although this also refers to the loaches in the family Balitoridae. This loach is found in the Thu Bon River drainage, Quang Nam Province in Vietnam.
