= Engkaria =

Conservation status
- Near Threatened (IUCN 3.1)

Scientific classification
- Kingdom: Animalia
- Phylum: Chordata
- Class: Actinopterygii
- Order: Cypriniformes
- Family: Gastromyzontidae
- Genus: Engkaria; H. H. Tan, 2021
- Species: E. eubranchus

Binomial name
- Engkaria eubranchus (T. R. Roberts, 1991)

Synonyms
- Hypergastromyzon eubranchus T. R. Roberts, 1991

Genus of fishes

Engkaria is a monospecific genus of ray-finned fish belonging to the family Gastromyzontidae, commonly called the hillstream loaches, although this also refers to the loaches in the family Balitoridae. The only species in the genus is Engkaria eubranchus, a species formerly classified in the genus Hypergastromyzon, which is endemic to the Lupar River basin in southern Sarawak in Malaysian Borneo.
