= Barbucca elongata =

Scientific classification
- Kingdom: Animalia
- Phylum: Chordata
- Class: Actinopterygii
- Order: Cypriniformes
- Family: Barbuccidae
- Genus: Barbucca
- Species: B. elongata

Binomial name
- Barbucca elongata Vasil'eva & Vasil'ev, 2013

Species of ray-finned fish found in Vietnam

Barbucca elongata is a small species of loach found in Vietnam. It was differentiated from Barbucca diabolica due to its longer body, conical snout, smooth lips, colouration, and more. The longest known specimen has a length of 34 mm (1.3 in). Its population has not yet been evaluated.

== Etymology ==
Its name, elongata, was given due to its body being more elongated than Barbucca diabolica, from the same genus.
