= Yaoshania =

Scientific classification
- Kingdom: Animalia
- Phylum: Chordata
- Class: Actinopterygii
- Order: Cypriniformes
- Family: Gastromyzontidae
- Genus: Yaoshania; Jian Yang, Kottelat, J. X. Yang & X. Y. Chen, 2012
- Species: Y. pachychilus

Binomial name
- Yaoshania pachychilus (Yi-Yu Chen, 1980)

Synonyms
- Protomyzon pachychilus Yi-Yu Chen, 1980

Species of fish

Yaoshania is a monospecific genus of freshwater ray-finned fish belonging to the family Gastromyzontidae, commonly called the hillstream loaches, although this also refers to the loaches in the family Balitoridae. The only species in the genus is Yaoshania pachychilus, the panda loach. A loach which is endemic to mountain streams in Jinxiu County, Guangxi in China. This species grows to a length of 5.8 centimetres (2.3 in) SL. This species is monotypic, but it was formerly included in Protomyzon. Juveniles are strikingly coloured in black-and-white, but adults are relatively plain. Y. pachychilus quickly became a popular aquarium fish in the 2010s.
