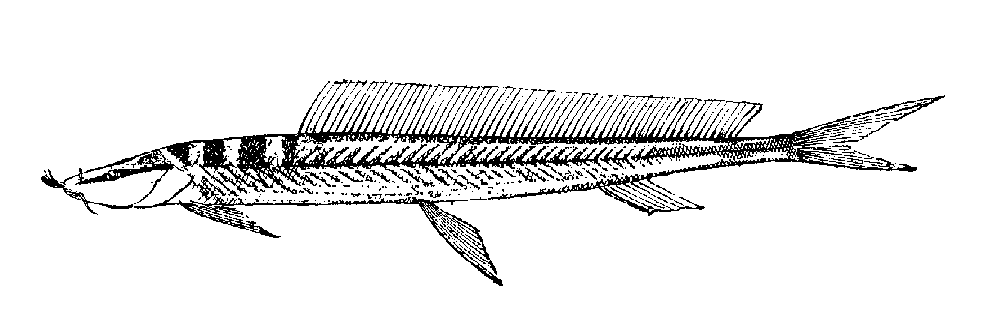

Conservation status
- Least Concern (IUCN 3.1)

Scientific classification
- Kingdom: Animalia
- Phylum: Chordata
- Class: Actinopterygii
- Division: Teleostei
- Order: Cypriniformes
- Family: Vaillantellidae
- Genus: Vaillantella
- Species: V. euepiptera

Binomial name
- Vaillantella euepiptera (Vaillant, 1902)

Synonyms
- Nemacheilus euepipterus Vaillant, 1902

= Vaillantella euepiptera =

Species of fish

Vaillantella euepiptera is a species of freshwater ray-finned fish, a loach, belonging to the family Vaillantellidae, the longfin loaches. This species is found in Southeast Asia.

== Taxonomy ==
Vaillantella euepiptera was first formally described as Nemacheilus euepipterus in 1902 by the French zoologist Léon Vaillant with its type locality given as Pontianak on the Kapuas River on Borneo. In 1905 Henry Weed Fowler proposed the monospecific genus Vaillantella for N. euepipterus, designating it as the type species of the new genus. Since then two other species have been described as belonging to the genus Vaillantella, V. massi in 1912 and V. cinnamomea in 1994. The genus Vaillantella is the only genus in the monotypic family Vaillantellidae, the longfin loaches, within the suborder Cobitoidei in the order Cypriniformes.

== Etymology ==
Vailantella euepiptera is the type species of the genus Vaillantella a name which honours Léon Vaillant, the describer of this species, in recognition of this "distinguished ichthyologist of the Museum of Natural History of Paris, and well known for his researches in East Indian ichthyology". The specific name, euepiptera, combines eu-, meaning "good", with epi, which means "on top of", and ptera, meaning "finned". This name was not explained by Vaillant but is probably an allusion to the very long dorsal fin of this species.

== Description ==
Vailantella euepiptera is a long, thin fish with a laterally compressed body and a long dorsal fin. The fin rays of the dorsal fin decrease in length from front to back. It has a deeply forked caudal fin which has long, pointed lobes, the upper lobe being the longer. The head is short with the mouth being under the snout and the upper lip has three pairs of barbels, two on the snout and one on the maxilla. The dorsal fin is supported by 3 spines and 55 soft rays, the anal fin has 3 spines and 6 soft rays. The overall colour is brown with many small spots on the upper body and pale on the ventral surface with a slnder, plate stripe running along the flanks. There is an irregular stripe that runs along the back from the nape to the base of the caudal peduncle and this splits up into small saddles along the base of the dorsal fin. There is an orange stripe on the head beginning at the tip of the snout and forks above the rear nostril then over the eys before reuniting between the eye and the operculum, forking into two stripes again along the margin of the operculum. Another rather dark stripe uns from the snout through the lower part of the eye, over the operculum and to the origin of the lateral line. The fin mambranes are translucent with dark rays and each lobe of the caudal fin has a dark blotch in its centre. This species has a maximum published standard length of 12 cm (4.7 in).

== Distribution and habitat ==
Vailantella euepiptera is found in southeast Asia where it has been recorded from the Kapuas River system in West Kalimantan on Borneo and from the Pahang River in Peninsular Malaysia. This loach Tis found in sizeable streams where the substrate consists of clay or other soft materials. with leaf litter, turbidity and a slow currents. It prefers areas of these streams which are at least partially shaded by trees.
