= Beaufortia cyclica =

Conservation status
- Least Concern (IUCN 3.1)

Scientific classification
- Kingdom: Animalia
- Phylum: Chordata
- Class: Actinopterygii
- Order: Cypriniformes
- Family: Gastromyzontidae
- Genus: Beaufortia
- Species: B. cyclica

Binomial name
- Beaufortia cyclica Yi-Yu Chen, 1980

Species of fish

Beaufortia cyclica is a species of ray-finned fish in the genus Beaufortia.

== Footnotes ==
- Froese, Rainer; Pauly, Daniel (eds.). "Beaufortia cyclica". FishBase.
