= Sewellia analis =

Scientific classification
- Kingdom: Animalia
- Phylum: Chordata
- Class: Actinopterygii
- Division: Teleostei
- Order: Cypriniformes
- Family: Gastromyzontidae
- Genus: Sewellia
- Species: S. analis

Binomial name
- Sewellia analis H. D. Nguyễn & V. H. Nguyễn, 2005

Species of fish

Sewellia analis is a species of freshwater fish in the family Gastromyzontidae. The fish was discovered in 2005 and is only known in Vietnam.
