= Sewellia patella =

Conservation status
- Endangered (IUCN 3.1)

Scientific classification
- Kingdom: Animalia
- Phylum: Chordata
- Class: Actinopterygii
- Order: Cypriniformes
- Family: Gastromyzontidae
- Genus: Sewellia
- Species: S. patella

Binomial name
- Sewellia patella Freyhof & Serov, 2000

Species of fish

Sewellia patella is a species of fish belonging to the Gastromyzontidae family. The fish is found in Vietnam and the maximum length for the fish is 4.8 cm (1.9 in) long (SL).

== Status ==
The fish is classified as an endangered species by the IUCN under criteria A2acd.
