= Sewellia hypsicrateae =

Scientific classification
- Domain: Eukaryota
- Kingdom: Animalia
- Phylum: Chordata
- Class: Actinopterygii
- Order: Cypriniformes
- Family: Gastromyzontidae
- Genus: Sewellia
- Species: S. hypsicrateae

Binomial name
- Sewellia hypsicrateae Endruweit & T. D. P. Nguyễn, 2016

Species of fish

Sewellia hypsicrateae is a species of fish in the genus Sewellia. The fish was first described in the Dakrong River in 2016.
