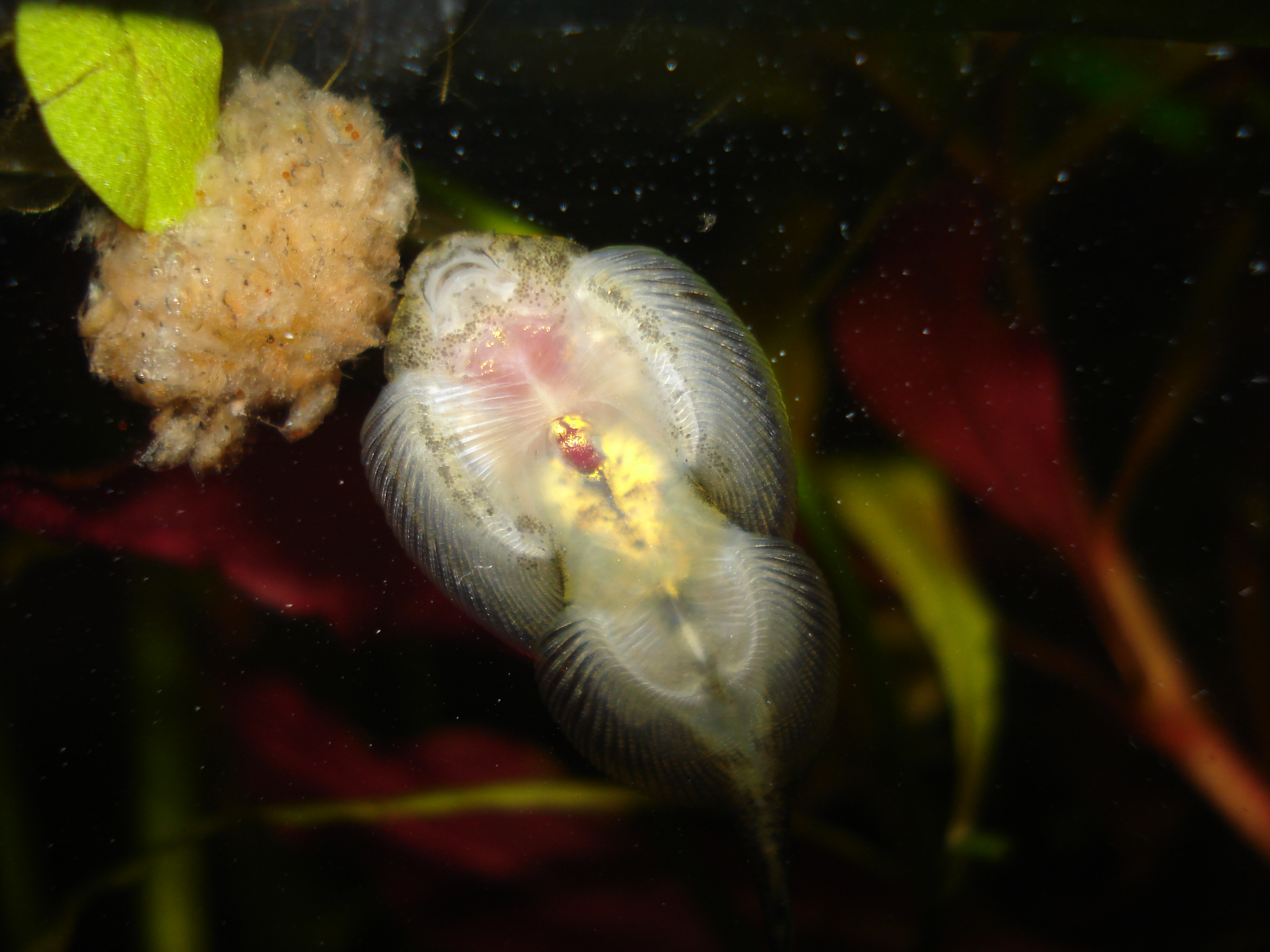
- Ventral view

Conservation status
- Data Deficient (IUCN 3.1)

Scientific classification
- Kingdom: Animalia
- Phylum: Chordata
- Class: Actinopterygii
- Order: Cypriniformes
- Family: Gastromyzontidae
- Genus: Beaufortia
- Species: B. leveretti

Binomial name
- Beaufortia leveretti (Nichols & C. H. Pope, 1927)

Synonyms
- Gastromyzon leveretti Nichols & Pope, 1927

= Beaufortia leveretti =

Species of fish

Beaufortia leveretti is a species of ray-finned fish in the genus Beaufortia.

== Distribution and status ==
It is native to fast-flowing streams of Red and Pearl River systems in China and Vietnam and to Hainan Island. It is found in large rivers and streams, in shallow water over sandy bottom. Its maximum length is 12 cm (4.7 in) but it is usually much smaller. In 2010, the status was changed from Data Deficient to Least Concern as this fish has a widespread range and no known threats.

It is fished but has low economic value. However, there are still unknown details such as population, threats and conservation measures.

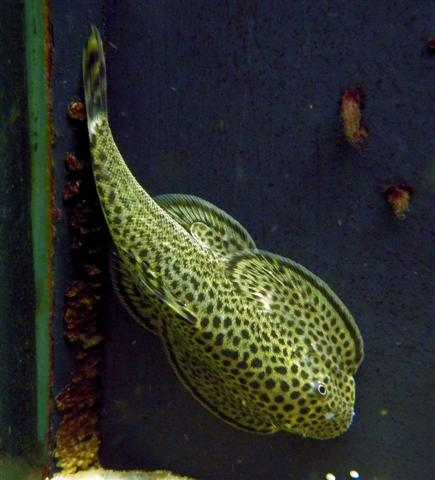
Dorsal view
