= Beaufortia pingi =

Conservation status
- Least Concern (IUCN 3.1)

Scientific classification
- Kingdom: Animalia
- Phylum: Chordata
- Class: Actinopterygii
- Order: Cypriniformes
- Family: Gastromyzontidae
- Genus: Beaufortia
- Species: B. pingi

Binomial name
- Beaufortia pingi (P. W. Fang, 1930)

Synonyms
- Gastromyzon pingi Fang, 1930

Species of fish

Beaufortia pingi is a species of river loach, belonging to the family Balitoridae or Gastromyzontidae, depending on the source. It is found in China (Yunnan and Guangxi) and Vietnam. This species inhabits fast-flowing hill streams and reaches a standard length of up to 5 cm (2.0 in).
