= Annamia =

Scientific classification
- Kingdom: Animalia
- Phylum: Chordata
- Class: Actinopterygii
- Order: Cypriniformes
- Family: Gastromyzontidae
- Genus: Annamia; Hora, 1932

Type species
- Parhomaloptera normani Hora, 1931

Genus of fishes

Annamia is a small genus of gastromyzontid loaches native to Southeast Asia. There are two species, though one of them is of doubtful validity and identity:

- Annamia normani (Hora, 1931), found in the Mekong basin
- Annamia thuathienensis H. D. Nguyễn & V. H. Nguyễn, 2005, found in Vietnam (species inquirenda)
