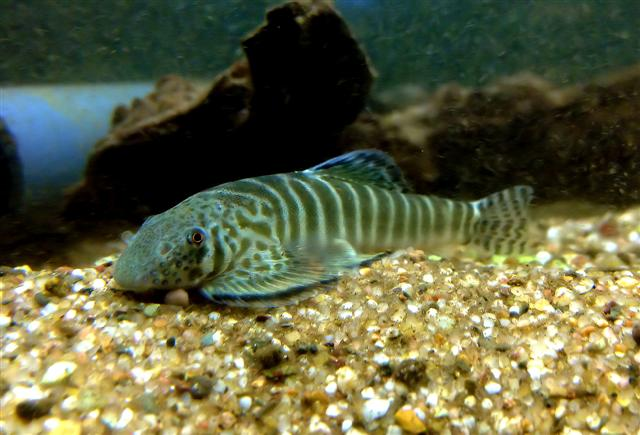
- Pseudogastromyzon fasciatus

Scientific classification
- Kingdom: Animalia
- Phylum: Chordata
- Class: Actinopterygii
- Order: Cypriniformes
- Family: Gastromyzontidae
- Genus: Pseudogastromyzon; Nichols, 1925

Type species
- Hemimyzon zebroidus (a synonym of Pseudogastromyzon fasciatus) Nichols, 1925

= Pseudogastromyzon =

Genus of fishes

Pseudogastromyzon is a genus of ray-finned fish belonging to the family Gastromyzontidae, commonly called the hillstream loaches, although this also refers to the loaches in the family Balitoridae. The loaches in this genus are found in fast-flowing streams and rivers in China.

== Species ==
There are currently 4 recognized species in this genus:

- Pseudogastromyzon cheni (Y. S. Liang, 1942)
- Pseudogastromyzon fasciatus (Sauvage, 1878)
- Pseudogastromyzon laticeps (Y. Y. Chen & C. Y. Zheng, 1980)
- Pseudogastromyzon myersi (Herre, 1932) (Sucker-belly loach)

The species P. daon, P. elongatus and P. loos are of uncertain taxonomic status.
