= Paraprotomyzon =

Scientific classification
- Kingdom: Animalia
- Phylum: Chordata
- Class: Actinopterygii
- Order: Cypriniformes
- Family: Gastromyzontidae
- Genus: Paraprotomyzon; Pellegrin & P. W. Fang, 1935

Type species
- Paraprotomyzon multifasciatus Pellegrin & Fang, 1935

Genus of fishes

Paraprotomyzon is a genus of gastromyzontid loaches endemic to China.

== Species ==
There are currently five known species in this genus:

- Paraprotomyzon bamaensis W. Q. Tang, 1997
- Paraprotomyzon lungkowensis C. X. Xie, G. R. Yang & L. X. Gong, 1984
- Paraprotomyzon multifasciatus Pellegrin & P. W. Fang, 1935
- Paraprotomyzon niulanjiangensis Y. F. Lu, Zong-Min Lu & W. N. Mao, 2005
- Paraprotomyzon yunnanensis (W. X. Li, Zong-Min Lu & W. N. Mao, 1988)
