= SERTM2 =

Human Gene

Identifiers
- Aliases: SERTM2, DKFZp686D0853, long intergenic non-protein coding RNA 890, LINC00890, serine rich and transmembrane domain containing 2
- External IDs: GeneCards: SERTM2
Orthologs
| Databases | NCBI: entry; OMA: entry |
| Species | Human | Mouse |
| Entrez | 401613 | n/a |
| Ensembl | ENSG00000260802 | n/a |
| UniProt | n a | n/a |
| RefSeq (mRNA) | n/a | n/a |
| RefSeq (protein) | n/a | n/a |
| Location (UCSC) | n/a | n/a |
| PubMed search | | n/a |
- Wikidata
| View/Edit Human |

SERTM2, also known as the Serine Rich And Transmembrane Domain Containing 2, is a protein which in humans is encoded by the SERTM2 gene. The SERTM2 protein is a transmembrane protein located in the intracellular membrane and active in membrane-bound organelles. SERTM2 expression has been linked to metastatic prostate tumors, prostate carcinomas and renal cell carcinomas.

== Gene ==
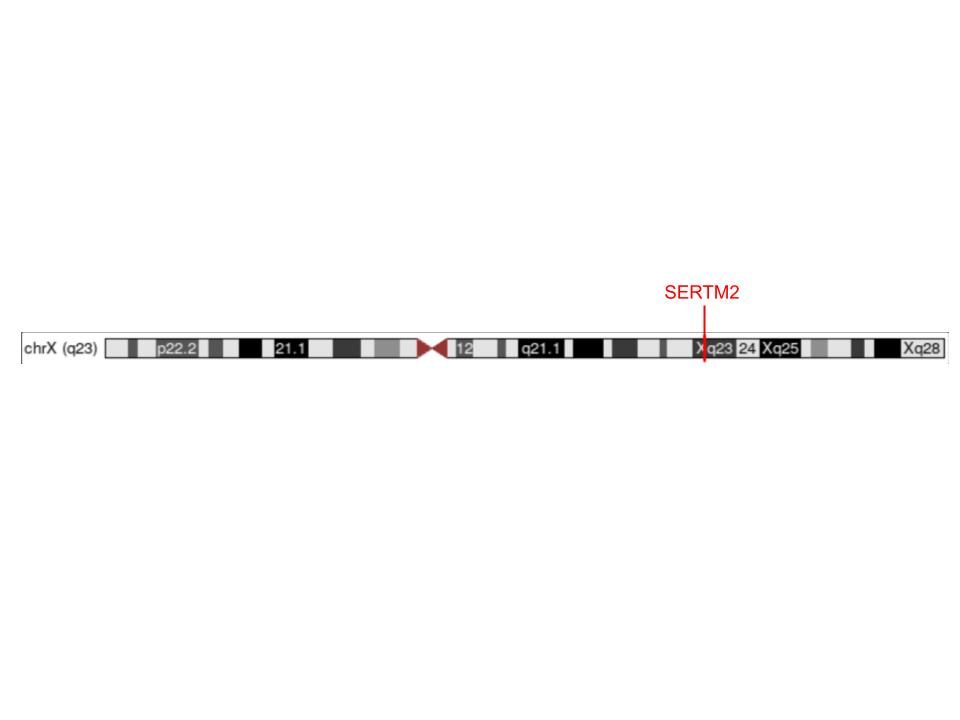
SERTM2 labelled at location Xq23

The SERTM2 gene in humans is located on the positive strand of the X chromosome (Xq23), spanning 10,755 base pairs. The SERTM2 gene has three total exons. There is one known transcript or isoform that spans 4,612 base pairs.

=== Aliases ===
SERTM2 is also known as:

- Serine-Rich And Transmembrane Domain-Containing 2 (SERTM2)
- Long Intergenic Non-Protein Coding RNA 890 (LINC00890)
- CARDEL (Cardiac Development Long non-coding RNA)

== Protein ==
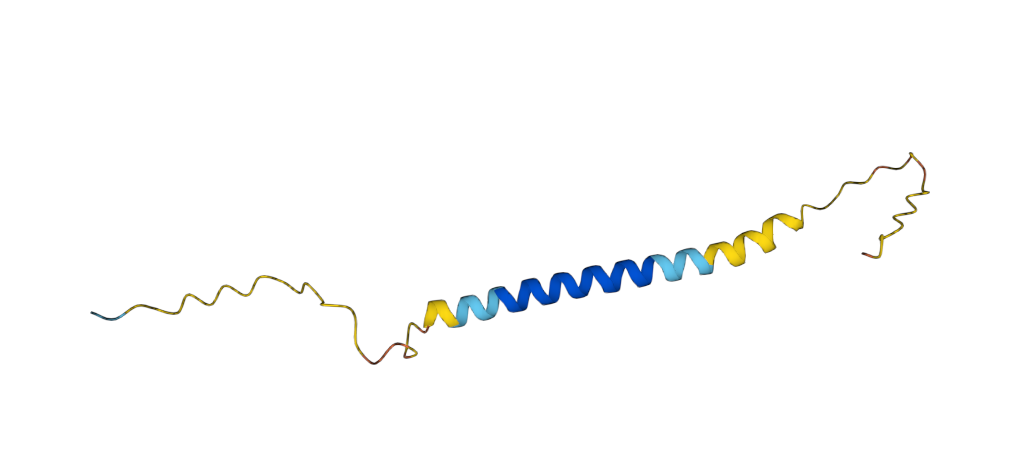
Predicted tertiary structure prediction of the SERTM2 protein in humans, Microcaecilia unicolor, alligators, and wombats. Blue = high confidence, yellow = low confidence. Made using the AlphaFold Protein Structure Database.

The SERTM2 protein is 90 amino acids long. This protein has a predicted molecular weight of 10 kDa and an isoelectric point of 6. The human SERTM2 protein structure contains two topological domains: extracellular and cytoplasmic. These domains are connected by a transmembrane domain within a confirmed alpha helix. The human protein contains a disordered region at the tail of the protein. Despite having serine-rich in its common name, the protein was not found to have abundance of serine or any other amino acid when compared to other human proteins.

=== Post-translational modifications ===
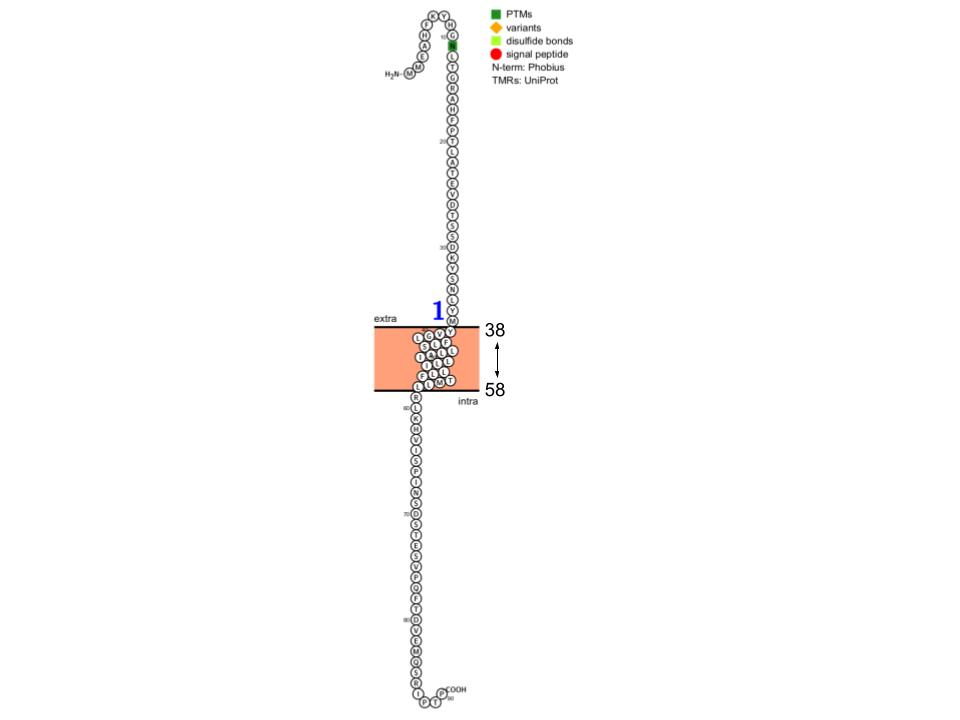
Diagram of human SERTM2 protein highlighting its transmembrane domain. The N-terminus is extracellular, and the C-terminus is intracellular. Made using Protter.

The human SERTM2 protein has one confirmed post-translational modification at the 11th position. The asparagine at that position undergoes N-linked glycosylation, or the attachment of an oligosaccharide to a nitrogen atom on the asparagine side chain.

== Expression ==
RNA-sequencing and human tissue profiling has found that SERTM2 is expressed primarily in the endometrium prostate, and liver of humans at moderate level. SERTM2 is found to be upregulated in cardiac progenitor cells compared to mesoderm cells and in fetal cells versus adult heart tissue using RNA-sequencing data. Using knockout and overexpression experiments, it was found that both the knockout and overexpression of SERTM2 results in low cardiomyocyte yield, suggesting that expression must be carefully regulated during cellular differentiation for normal cardiac development to occur and resulted in the nickname CARDEL (Cardiac Development Long non-coding RNA).

== Homologs and evolution ==
The human SERTM2 has no paralogs. SERTM2 orthologs are found in mammals, birds, reptiles, amphibians, and some fish. The earliest known SERTM2 gene appeared 462 million years ago in the catshark, a cartilaginous fish. The gene is hard to find in fish, with only two other known appearances in the tiger barb and the Chinese sucker fish, two bony fish. SERTM2 became more established in amphibians 352 million years ago, and its orthologs are found throughout modern reptiles, birds, mammals, and primates.

Table 1: Human serine-rich and transmembrane-domain containing 2 (SERTM2) gene orthologs. Orthologs are sorted first by date of divergence from the human gene, then by similarity to the human sequence.

| | Common Name | Scientific Name | Accession Number | Taxonomical Group | Sequence Length (amino acids) | Date of Divergence (MYA) | % identical |
| Primata | Human | Homo sapiens | NP_001341402.1 | Primates | 90 | - | 100 |
| Primata | Ring-tailed lemur | Lemur catta | XP_045393689.1 | Primates | 90 | 74 | 93 |
| | Beluga whale | Delphinapterus leucas | XP_030615360.1 | Cetacea | 90 | 94 | 92 |
| | Mouse | Mus musculus | NP_001341422.1 | Rodentia | 89 | 87 | 91 |
| | Big brown bat | Eptesicus fuscus | XP_054573025.1 | Chiroptera | 90 | 94 | 81 |
| | Common wombat | Vombatus ursinus | XP_027691215.1 | Marsupial | 90 | 160 | 81 |
| Aves | Blue tit | Cyanistes caeruleus | XP_023773484.1 | Aves | 91 | 319 | 76 |
| Aves | Chicken | Gallus gallus | XP_046795767.1 | Aves | 92 | 319 | 73 |
| Reptilia | Alligator | Alligator mississippiensis | XP_059588794.1 | Crocodilia | 92 | 319 | 79 |
| Reptilia | Burmese python | Python bivittatus | XP_025020345.1 | Squamata | 92 | 319 | 75 |
| Reptilia | Softshell turtle | Pelodiscus sinensis | XP_025033828.1 | Testudines | 92 | 319 | 60 |
| Amphibians | Microcaecilia unicolor | Microcaecilia unicolor | XP_030065343.1 | Gymnophiona | 91 | 352 | 68 |
| Amphibians | Two-lined caecilians | Rhinatrema bivittatum | XP_029463498.1 | Gymnophiona | 93 | 352 | 67 |
| Amphibians | Common frog | Rana temporaria | XP_040179805.1 | Anura | 92 | 352 | 70 |
| Fish/Sharks | Tiger barb | Puntigrus tetrazona | XP_043094501.1 | Osteichthyes | 103 | 429 | 24 |
| Fish/Sharks | Chinese sucker fish | Myxocyprinus asiaticus | XP_051542736.1 | Osteichthyes | 108 | 429 | 21 |
| Fish/Sharks | Catshark | Scyliorhinus canicula | XP_038632174.1 | Chondrichthyes | 89 | 462 | 42 |

== Clinical significance ==
Metastatic tumors in the prostate have been shown to have 3-fold more expression of SERTM2 than primary tumors, suggesting that overexpression of SERTM2 may be linked to the metastatic nature of prostate tumors. SERTM2 overexpression has been observed in tumor microenvironment of androgen receptor pathway-positive adenocarcinoma of the prostate (ARPC). In comparison to ARPC, SERTM2 expression is lower in the tumor microenvironment of neuroendocrine prostate carcinomas (NEPC), a more severe type of prostate cancer.
