= Beaufortia polylepis =

Conservation status
- Least Concern (IUCN 3.1)

Scientific classification
- Kingdom: Animalia
- Phylum: Chordata
- Class: Actinopterygii
- Order: Cypriniformes
- Family: Gastromyzontidae
- Genus: Beaufortia
- Species: B. polylepis

Binomial name
- Beaufortia polylepis Y. R. Chen, 1982

Species of fish

Beaufortia polylepis is a species of river loach (family Balitoridae or Gastromyzontidae, depending on the source). It is endemic to the Nanpan River in Yunnan, China. It inhabits rocky streams and measures 3.9–4.8 cm (1.5–1.9 in) standard length.
