= Sewellia trakhucensis =

Scientific classification
- Kingdom: Animalia
- Phylum: Chordata
- Class: Actinopterygii
- Division: Teleostei
- Order: Cypriniformes
- Family: Gastromyzontidae
- Genus: Sewellia
- Species: S. trakhucensis

Binomial name
- Sewellia trakhucensis H. D. Nguyễn & V. H. Nguyễn, 2005

Species of fish

Sewellia trakhucensis is a species of fish in the Sewellia genus. The fish is only known in Vietnam.
