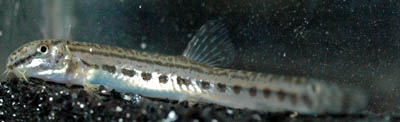
- Formosiana lacustre

Scientific classification
- Kingdom: Animalia
- Phylum: Chordata
- Class: Actinopterygii
- Order: Cypriniformes
- Family: Gastromyzontidae
- Genus: Formosania; Ōshima, 1919

Type species
- Formosiana gilberti, a synonym of Formosania lacustre Ōshima, 1919

Synonyms
- Crossostoma Sauvage, 1878

= Formosania =

Genus of fishes

Formosania is a genus of gastromyzontid loaches native to China and Taiwan.

== Distribution ==
Most members of this are endemic to mainland China. Two species, F. lacustris and F. gilberti, are endemic to Taiwan.

== Species ==
There are currently 11 species that has been recognized as belonging to this genus. They are listed below:

- Formosania chenyiyui (C. Y. Zheng, 1991)
- Formosania davidi (Sauvage, 1878)
- Formosania fascicauda (Nichols, 1926)
- Formosania fasciolata (H. G. Wang, Z. Y. Fan & Ying Chen, 2006)
- Formosania galericula (X. F. Zhang, 2011)
- Formosania immaculata W. Sun, J.-J. Zhou & J.-Q. Yang, 2023
- Formosania lacustris (Steindachner, 1908)
- Formosania paucisquama (C. Y. Zheng, 1981)
- Formosania stigmata (Nichols, 1926)
- Formosania tangi (Chen, Zhou, Chen & Yang, 2026)
- Formosania tinkhami (Herre, 1934)
