= Sewellia albisuera =

Conservation status
- Critically Endangered (IUCN 3.1)

Scientific classification
- Kingdom: Animalia
- Phylum: Chordata
- Class: Actinopterygii
- Order: Cypriniformes
- Family: Gastromyzontidae
- Genus: Sewellia
- Species: S. albisuera

Binomial name
- Sewellia albisuera Freyhof, 2003

Species of fish

Sewellia albisuera is a species of fish in the genus Sewellia. The fish is only found in Vietnam and is 6.4 cm (2.5 in) long (SL).

== Status ==
As of 2011, the IUCN listed Sewellia albisuera as Critically Endangered under criteria A2c+3c; B1b(i,ii).
