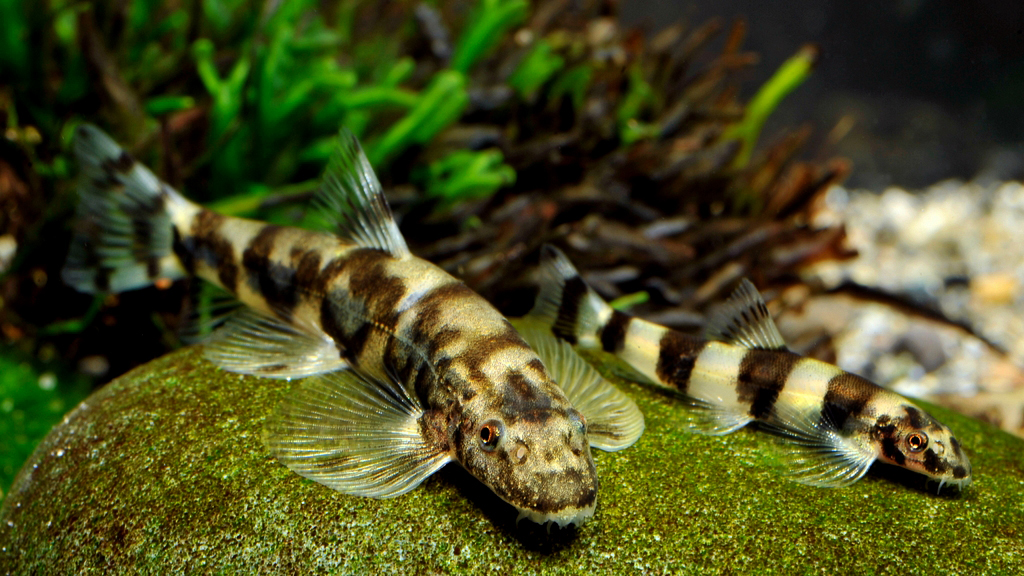

Scientific classification
- Kingdom: Animalia
- Phylum: Chordata
- Class: Actinopterygii
- Order: Cypriniformes
- Family: Gastromyzontidae
- Genus: Plesiomyzon; C. Y. Zheng & Y.-Y. Chen, 1980
- Species: P. baotingensis

Binomial name
- Plesiomyzon baotingensis C. Y. Zheng & Y.-Y. Chen, 1980

= Plesiomyzon =

Species of fish

Plesiomyzon is a monospecific genus of freshwater ray-finned fish belonging to the family Gastromyzontidae, a group which shares the common name hillstream loaches with the family Balitoridae. The only species in the genus is Plesiomyzon baotingensis, a loach that is endemic to the river systems of Hainan.
