= Katibasia =

Conservation status
- Least Concern (IUCN 3.1)

Scientific classification
- Kingdom: Animalia
- Phylum: Chordata
- Class: Actinopterygii
- Order: Cypriniformes
- Family: Gastromyzontidae
- Genus: Katibasia; Kottelat, 2004
- Species: K. insidiosa

Binomial name
- Katibasia insidiosa Kottelat, 2004

Species of fish

Katibasia is a monospecific genus of freshwater ray-finned fish belonging to the family Gastromyzontidae, a group which shares the common name hillstream loaches with the family Balitoridae. The only species in the genus is Katibasia insidiosa, a species of loach which is endemic to Sarawak, Eastern Malaysia.
