= Sewellia breviventralis =

Conservation status
- Critically Endangered (IUCN 3.1)

Scientific classification
- Kingdom: Animalia
- Phylum: Chordata
- Class: Actinopterygii
- Order: Cypriniformes
- Family: Gastromyzontidae
- Genus: Sewellia
- Species: S. breviventralis

Binomial name
- Sewellia breviventralis Freyhof & Serov, 2000

Species of fish

Sewellia breviventralis is a species of fish belonging in the family Gastromyzontidae. The fish is only known in Vietnam and reaches up to 5.1 cm (2.0 in) long (SL).

== Status ==
As of 2011, the IUCN has listed Sewellia breviventralis as Critically Endangered under criteria A2ac.
