= Beaufortia szechuanensis =

Scientific classification
- Domain: Eukaryota
- Kingdom: Animalia
- Phylum: Chordata
- Class: Actinopterygii
- Order: Cypriniformes
- Family: Gastromyzontidae
- Genus: Beaufortia
- Species: B. szechuanensis

Binomial name
- Beaufortia szechuanensis (P. W. Fang, 1930)

Synonyms
- Gastromyzon szechuanensis Fang, 1930

Species of fish

Beaufortia szechuanensis is a species of ray-finned fish in the genus Beaufortia.

== Footnotes ==
- Froese, Rainer; Pauly, Daniel (eds.). "Beaufortia szechuanensis". FishBase.
