= Sewellia marmorata =

Conservation status
- Endangered (IUCN 3.1)

Scientific classification
- Kingdom: Animalia
- Phylum: Chordata
- Class: Actinopterygii
- Order: Cypriniformes
- Family: Gastromyzontidae
- Genus: Sewellia
- Species: S. marmorata

Binomial name
- Sewellia marmorata Serov, 1996

Species of fish

Sewellia marmorata is a species in the Sewellia genus. The fish is highly territorial and is only found in Vietnam. The fish maximum length is 6.4 cm (2.5 in) long (SL).

== Status ==
The fish is classified as an endangered species by the IUCN under criteria A2c; B1ab(i,ii,iii).
