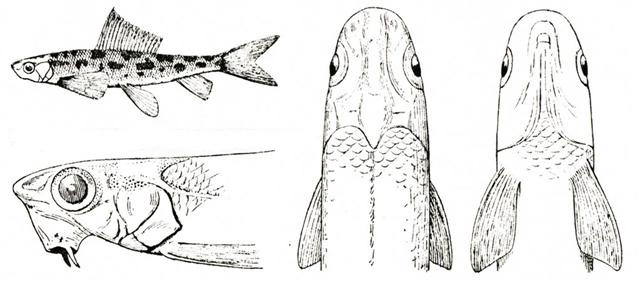

Conservation status
- Vulnerable (IUCN 3.1)

Scientific classification
- Kingdom: Animalia
- Phylum: Chordata
- Class: Actinopterygii
- Division: Teleostei
- Order: Cypriniformes
- Family: Ellopostomatidae
- Genus: Ellopostoma
- Species: E. megalomycter

Binomial name
- Ellopostoma megalomycter (Vaillant, 1902)

Synonyms
- Aperioptus megalomycter Vaillant, 1902

= Ellopostoma megalomycter =

Species of fish

Ellopostoma megalomycter is a species of freshwater ray-finned fish, a loach, belonging to the family Ellopostomatidae, the square-head loaches. This species is known only from Borneo where it is only found in the Kapuas River system in West Kalimantan in Indonesia. Here it lives in fast flowing rivers, feeding on small invertebrates, algae and detritus from the streambed.
