= Beaufortia liui =

Scientific classification
- Domain: Eukaryota
- Kingdom: Animalia
- Phylum: Chordata
- Class: Actinopterygii
- Order: Cypriniformes
- Family: Gastromyzontidae
- Genus: Beaufortia
- Species: B. liui

Binomial name
- Beaufortia liui H. W. Chang, 1944

Species of fish

Beaufortia liui is a species of ray-finned fish in the genus Beaufortia.

== Footnotes ==
- Froese, Rainer; Pauly, Daniel (eds.). "Beaufortia liui". FishBase.
