= Beaufortia huangguoshuensis =

Scientific classification
- Domain: Eukaryota
- Kingdom: Animalia
- Phylum: Chordata
- Class: Actinopterygii
- Order: Cypriniformes
- Family: Gastromyzontidae
- Genus: Beaufortia
- Species: B. huangguoshuensis

Binomial name
- Beaufortia huangguoshuensis C. Y. Zheng & W. Zhang, 1987

Species of fish

Beaufortia huangguoshuensis is a species of ray-finned fish in the genus Beaufortia.

== Footnotes ==
- Froese, Rainer; Pauly, Daniel (eds.). "Beaufortia huangguoshuensis". FishBase.
