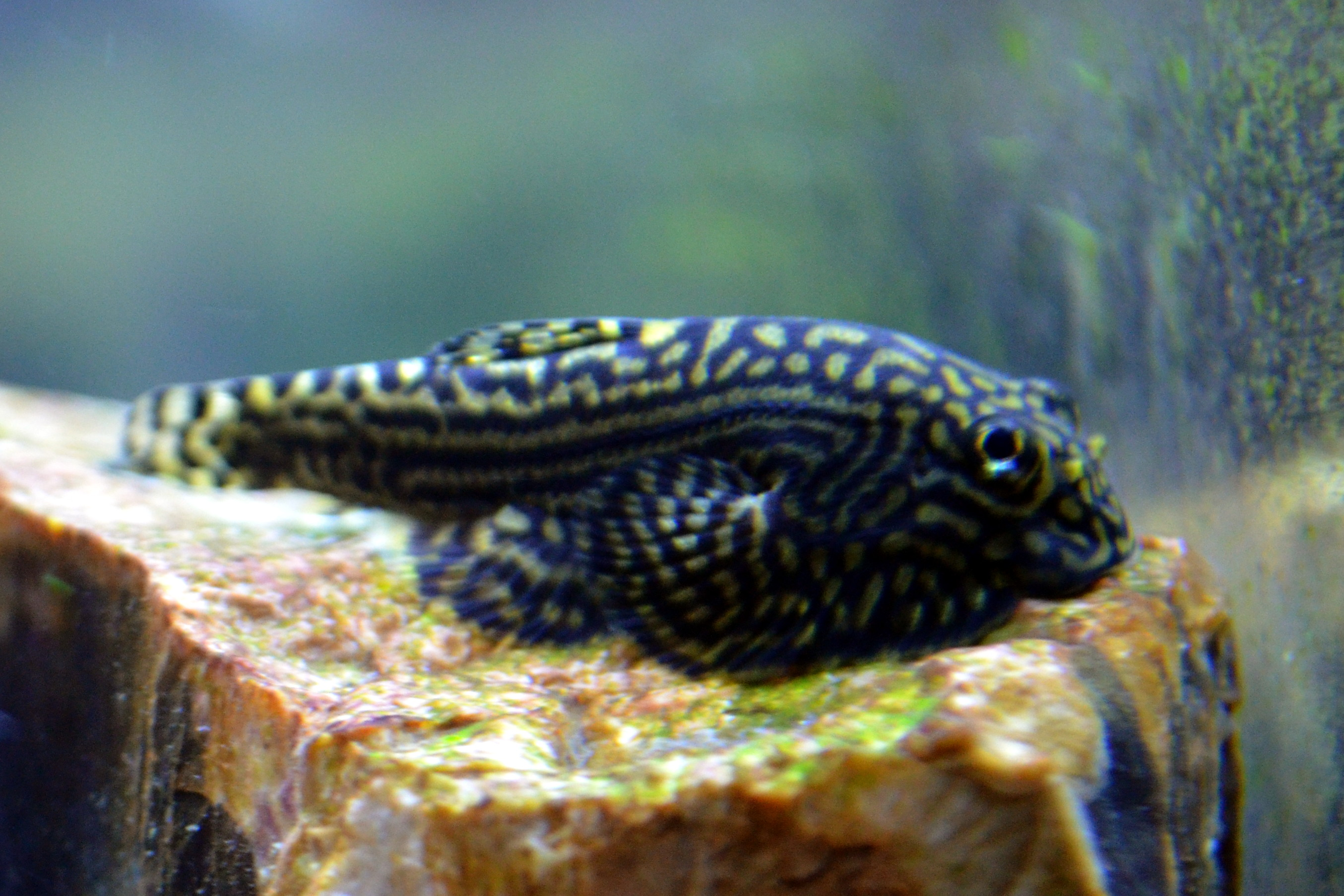

Conservation status
- Vulnerable (IUCN 3.1)

Scientific classification
- Kingdom: Animalia
- Phylum: Chordata
- Class: Actinopterygii
- Order: Cypriniformes
- Family: Gastromyzontidae
- Genus: Sewellia
- Species: S. lineolata

Binomial name
- Sewellia lineolata (Valenciennes, 1846)

Synonyms
- Balitora lineolata Valenciennes, 1846

= Sewellia lineolata =

Species of fish

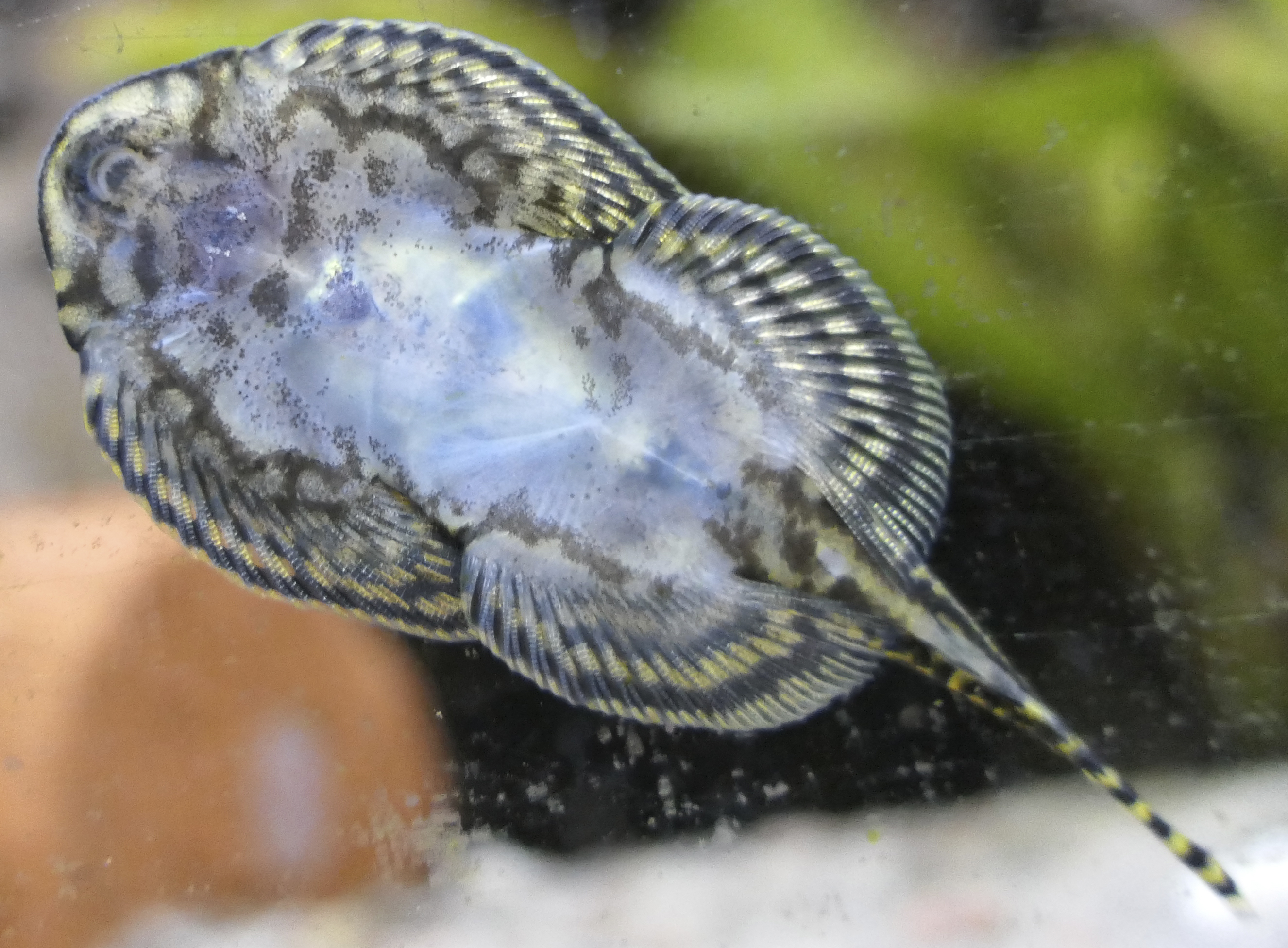
Underside of Sewellia lineola

Sewellia lineolata, the reticulated hillstream loach, is a species of fish from the provinces of Thua Thien-Hue, Quang Nam, Quang Ngai and Binh Dinh in Vietnam.

== Habitat ==
Sewellia lineotola is found in shallow, fast-flowing, highly oxygenated tributaries and headwaters that contain stretches of riffles broken up by pools or sometimes waterfalls. Inhabited substrates are normally composed of gravel, bedrock and sand among stretches containing boulders, surrounded by well-developed riparian vegetations but with fewer aquatic plants present. The most favorable habitats have oxygen-saturated clear water which, combined with the sun, creates a rich biofilm covering submerged surfaces. During times of high rainfall, some streams can become murky as a result of suspended material caused by larger flow rate and water depth.

== Diet ==
Sewellia lineolata eat benthic algae and associated micro-organisms. Insect larvae may be eaten opportunistically. In the aquarium, fish flakes, mini pellets, and algae wafers can also be added to the diet, along with bloodworms, brine shrimp, daphnia, and tubifex.

Tiger Hillstream Loaches, Sewellia lineolata, have especially developed fins to attach themselves to rocks and flat areas in their naturally fast moving rivers and streams. For them to survive and be happy they need strong currents plus abundant oxygen, numerous rocky hiding places and smooth pebbles and boulders to graze over.

Lighting should be bright to encourage algal growth in the aquarium. Plants are not necessary as the fish do not normally encounter them in the wild. They demand excellent water-quality. Suitable plants for high-flow environments are Anubias and Microsoreum. These will grow on rock-work or driftwood.

Note these fish have smaller mouths than Gastromyzon species which should be a consideration with foodstuffs. Good quality flake, small sinking pellets, algae wafers, thawed frozen Bloodworm, Mysis Shrimp, blanched Spinach, Kale, natural algae are good foods for them.

One part of their habits that differs from Gastromyzon or Beaufortia is that of "gliding" on the current. Those other species will move from a rock quickly to another in short hops, but Sewellia will launch from an elevated rock or other decor and glide on the current for some distance before alighting on another hard surface, or sometimes the substrate.

Also, unlike many other Sucker-bodied Hillstream Loaches, they seem far more at ease when searching for food on the loose surface of sand or fine gravel, and will flutter their fins, disturbing the surface grains. It appears they do this to uncover possible food items.
