= Sewellia speciosa =

Conservation status
- Least Concern (IUCN 3.1)

Scientific classification
- Kingdom: Animalia
- Phylum: Chordata
- Class: Actinopterygii
- Order: Cypriniformes
- Family: Gastromyzontidae
- Genus: Sewellia
- Species: S. speciosa

Binomial name
- Sewellia speciosa T. R. Roberts, 1998

Species of fish

Sewellia speciosa is a species of fish that is part of the family Gastromyzontidae. The fish is found in both Laos and Vietnam. It reaches up to 5.4 centimeters in length.
