= Labigastromyzon =

Scientific classification
- Kingdom: Animalia
- Phylum: Chordata
- Class: Actinopterygii
- Order: Cypriniformes
- Family: Gastromyzontidae
- Genus: Labigastromyzon; W.-Q. Tang & Y.-Y. Chen, 1996

Type species
- * Crossostoma fangi Nichols, 1931

Genus of fishes

Labigastromyzon is a genus of ray-finned fish belonging to the family Gastromyzontidae, commonly called the hillstream loaches, although this also refers to the loaches in the family Balitoridae. The loaches in the genus are found in China.

== Species ==
There are currently 3 recognized species in this genus:

- Labigastromyzon changtingensis (Y. S. Liang, 1942)
- Labigastromyzon fangi (Nichols, 1931)
