= Sewellia pterolineata =

Conservation status
- Endangered (IUCN 3.1)

Scientific classification
- Kingdom: Animalia
- Phylum: Chordata
- Class: Actinopterygii
- Order: Cypriniformes
- Family: Gastromyzontidae
- Genus: Sewellia
- Species: S. pterolineata

Binomial name
- Sewellia pterolineata Roberts, 1998

Species of fish

Sewellia pterolineata is a species of fish in the genus Sewellia. The fish is found in the Trac Khuc River and is 4.4 cm (1.7 in) long (SL).

== Status ==
The IUCN has listed Sewellia pterolineata as an endangered species under criteria A2c+3c; B1b(i,ii).
