= Beaufortia =

Beaufortia may refer to:

- Beaufortia (fish), a genus of hillstream loach
- Beaufortia (plant), a genus of plants in the family Myrtaceae
- Beaufortia, the bulletin of the Zoological Museum Amsterdam, published by the University of Amsterdam
