= Sewellia elongata =

Conservation status
- Near Threatened (IUCN 3.1)

Scientific classification
- Kingdom: Animalia
- Phylum: Chordata
- Class: Actinopterygii
- Order: Cypriniformes
- Family: Gastromyzontidae
- Genus: Sewellia
- Species: S. elongata

Binomial name
- Sewellia elongata T. R. Roberts, 1998

Species of fish

Sewellia elongata is a species of fish in the genus Sewellia. The fish is found in the Se Kong River and is 7.3 cm (2.9 in) long (SL).
