= Sewellia diardi =

Conservation status
- Data Deficient (IUCN 3.1)

Scientific classification
- Kingdom: Animalia
- Phylum: Chordata
- Class: Actinopterygii
- Order: Cypriniformes
- Family: Gastromyzontidae
- Genus: Sewellia
- Species: S. diardi

Binomial name
- Sewellia diardi T. R. Roberts, 1998

Species of fish

Sewellia diardi is a species of fish belonging in the Gastromyzontidae family. The fish is found in Laos, the fish is 7.2 cm (2.8 in) long (SL).
