= B. intermedia =

B. intermedia may refer to:

- Beaufortia intermedia, a ray-finned fish species
- Belgrandiella intermedia, a recently extinct species of very small freshwater snail that was endemic to Central Europe, particularly to Austria
- Boerhavia intermedia, the five-wing spiderling, a plant species found in the southwestern United States and northern Mexico
- Brachytarsophrys intermedia, an amphibian species found in Vietnam and possibly in Cambodia and Laos
- Bythinella intermedia, a recently extinct species of very small freshwater snail that was endemic to Austria

== Synonyms ==
- Bacularia intermedia, a synonym for Linospadix minor, the minor walking stick palm, a small tropical forest palm species found in North-East Queensland

== See also ==
- Intermedia (disambiguation)
