= Bashimyzon =

Scientific classification
- Kingdom: Animalia
- Phylum: Chordata
- Class: Actinopterygii
- Order: Cypriniformes
- Family: Gastromyzontidae
- Genus: Bashimyzon; X. Gong & E. Zhang, 2024

Type species
- Erromyzon damingshanensis L. H. Xiu & J. Yang, 2017

Genus of fishes

Bashimyzon is a genus of freshwater ray-finned fishes belonging to the family Gastromyzontidae, a family which shares the common name hillstream loaches with the Balitoridae. These loaches are found in the Guangxi Province of China.

== Species ==
Bashimyzon contains the following 2 species:

- Bashimyzon cheni X. Gong & E. Zhang, 2024
- Bashimyzon damingshanensis (L. H. Xiu & J. Yang, 2017)
