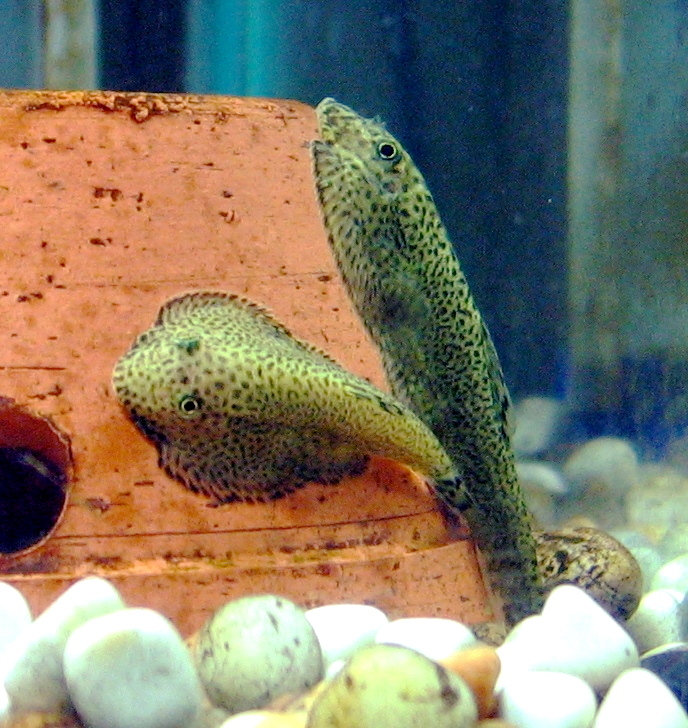
- Beaufortia kweichowensis

Scientific classification
- Kingdom: Animalia
- Phylum: Chordata
- Class: Actinopterygii
- Order: Cypriniformes
- Family: Gastromyzontidae
- Genus: Beaufortia; Hora, 1932

Type species
- Gastromyzon leveretti Nichols & Pope, 1927

Species
- 14, see text

= Beaufortia (fish) =

Genus of fishes

Beaufortia is a genus of gastromyzontid loaches from China and mainland Southeast Asia.

== Species ==
There are currently 14 species recognized in this genus though the generic placement of some and validity of others are questionable:

- Beaufortia cyclica Yi-Yu Chen, 1980
- Beaufortia fasciolata Nguyen, 2005
- Beaufortia huangguoshuensis C. Y. Zheng & W. Zhang, 1987
- Beaufortia intermedia W. Q. Tang & D. Z. Wang, 1997
- Beaufortia kweichowensis (P. W. Fang, 1931)
- Beaufortia leveretti (Nichols & C. H. Pope, 1927)
- Beaufortia liui H. W. Chang, 1944
- Beaufortia multiocellata Nguyen, 2005
- Beaufortia niulanensis Z. M. Chen, Y. F. Huang & J. X. Yang, 2009
- Beaufortia pingi (P. W. Fang, 1930)
- Beaufortia polylepis Y. R. Chen, 1982
- Beaufortia szechuanensis (P. W. Fang, 1930)
- Beaufortia triocellata Nguyen, 2005
- Beaufortia zebroidus (P. W. Fang, 1930)
