= Parhomaloptera =

Conservation status
- Least Concern (IUCN 3.1)

Scientific classification
- Kingdom: Animalia
- Phylum: Chordata
- Class: Actinopterygii
- Order: Cypriniformes
- Family: Gastromyzontidae
- Genus: Parhomaloptera; Vaillant, 1902
- Species: P. microstoma

Binomial name
- Parhomaloptera microstoma (Boulenger, 1899)

Synonyms
- Homaloptera microstoma Boulenger, 1899: Parhomaloptera obscura Vaillant, 1902

Genus of fish

Parhomaloptera is a monospecific genus of freshwater ray-finned fish belonging to the family Gastromyzontidae, a group which shares the common name hillstream loaches with the family Balitoridae. The only species in the genus is Parhomaloptera microstoma. It lives in fast-flowing streams and grows to a maximum published total length of 8.8 cm (3.5 in). This taxon is endemi to Borneo, occurring in both East Malaysia and Kalimantan.
