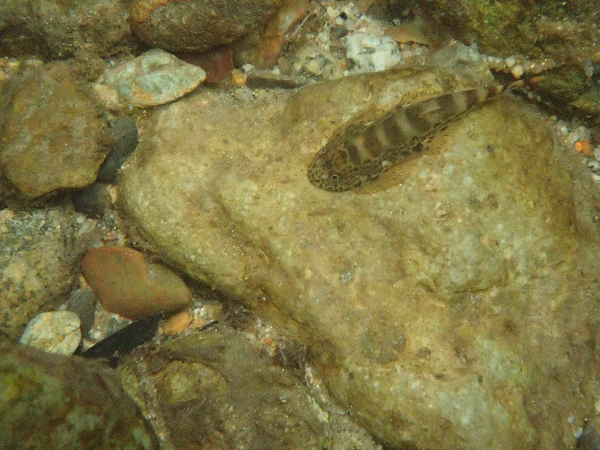
- Hypergastromyzon humilis

Scientific classification
- Kingdom: Animalia
- Phylum: Chordata
- Class: Actinopterygii
- Order: Cypriniformes
- Suborder: Cobitoidei
- Family: Gastromyzontidae
- Genus: Hypergastromyzon; T. R. Roberts, 1989

Type species
- Hypergastromyzon humilis T. R. Roberts, 1989

= Hypergastromyzon =

Genus of fishes

Hypergastromyzon is a genus of ray-finned fish belonging to the family Gastromyzontidae, commonly called the hillstream loaches, although this also refers to the loaches in the family Balitoridae. The loaches in this genus are endemic to the island of Borneo in Southeast Asia.

== Species ==
There are currently 3 recognized species in this genus:

- Hypergastromyzon abditus H. H. Tan, 2021
- Hypergastromyzon humilis T. R. Roberts, 1989
- Hypergastromyzon sambas H. H. Tan, 2021
