= Liniparhomaloptera =

Scientific classification
- Kingdom: Animalia
- Phylum: Chordata
- Class: Actinopterygii
- Order: Cypriniformes
- Family: Gastromyzontidae
- Genus: Liniparhomaloptera; P. W. Fang, 1935

Type species
- Parhomaloptera disparis Lin, 1934

Genus of fishes

Liniparhomaloptera is a genus of fish in the family Gastromyzontidae found in China and Vietnam.

== Species ==
There are currently 5 recognized species in this genus:

- Liniparhomaloptera disparis (S. Y. Lin, 1934)
- Liniparhomaloptera macrostoma T. J. Wu, L. H. Xiu & J. Yang, 2016
- Liniparhomaloptera monoloba (Đ. Y. Mai, 1978)
- Liniparhomaloptera obtusirostris C. Y. Zheng & Y. Y. Chen, 1980
- Liniparhomaloptera qiongzhongensis C. Y. Zheng & Y. Y. Chen, 1980
