= Protomyzon =

Scientific classification
- Kingdom: Animalia
- Phylum: Chordata
- Class: Actinopterygii
- Order: Cypriniformes
- Family: Gastromyzontidae
- Genus: Protomyzon; Hora, 1932

Type species
- Homaloptera whiteheadi Vaillant, 1894

Synonyms
- Progastromyzon Hora & Jayaram, 1952

Genus of fishes

Protomyzon is a genus of ray-finned fish belonging to the family Gastromyzontidae, commonly called the hillstream loaches, although this also refers to the loaches in the family Balitoridae. The loaches in this genus are endemic to Borneo.

== Species ==
There are currently four recognized species in this genus:

- Protomyzon aphelocheilus Inger & P. K. Chin, 1962
- Protomyzon borneensis Hora & Jayaram, 1952
- Protomyzon griswoldi Hora & Jayaram, 1952)
- Protomyzon whiteheadi (Vaillant, 1894)
