= Ellopostoma mystax =

Conservation status
- Endangered (IUCN 3.1)

Scientific classification
- Kingdom: Animalia
- Phylum: Chordata
- Class: Actinopterygii
- Order: Cypriniformes
- Family: Ellopostomatidae
- Genus: Ellopostoma
- Species: E. mystax

Binomial name
- Ellopostoma mystax Tan & Lim, 2002

Species of fish

Ellopostoma mystax, the enigmatic loach, is a small, endangered species of freshwater fish originally placed in the family Balitoridae, but now generally in Ellopostomatidae.

E. mystax is only found in Thailand in the basins of the Tapi River and the Pattani River.
