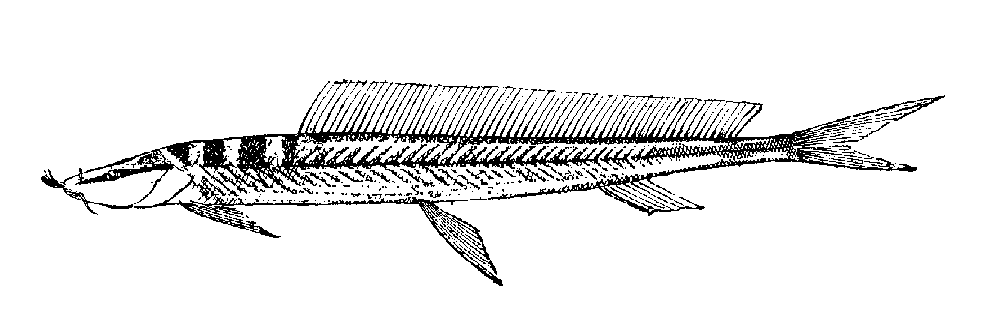
- Vaillantella euepiptera

Scientific classification
- Kingdom: Animalia
- Phylum: Chordata
- Class: Actinopterygii
- Order: Cypriniformes
- Suborder: Cobitoidei
- Family: Vaillantellidae; Nalbant & Bănărescu, 1977
- Genus: Vaillantella; Fowler, 1905

Type species
- Nemacheilus euepipterus Vaillant, 1902

= Vaillantella =

Genus of fishes

Vaillantella, the long-fin loaches, is a small genus of loaches found in Southeast Asia. This genus is the only member of the family Vaillantellidae having been confirmed as such by M. Kottelat in his review of the loaches in 2012.

== Species ==
There are currently three recognized species in this genus:

- Vaillantella cinnamomea Kottelat, 1994
- Vaillantella euepiptera (Vaillant, 1902)
- Vaillantella maassi M. C. W. Weber & de Beaufort, 1912
