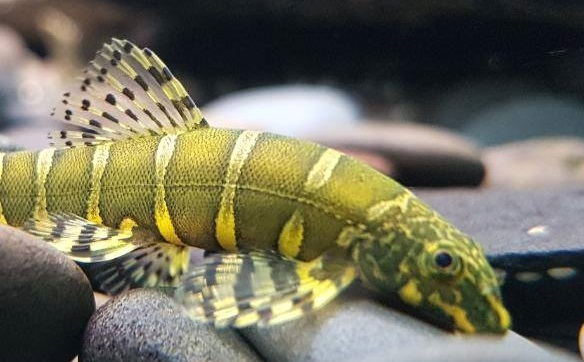
- Serpenticobitis cingulata

Scientific classification
- Kingdom: Animalia
- Phylum: Chordata
- Class: Actinopterygii
- Order: Cypriniformes
- Family: Serpenticobitidae; Kottelat, 2012
- Genus: Serpenticobitis; T. R. Roberts, 1997

Type species
- Serpenticobitis octozona T. R. Roberts, 1997

= Serpenticobitis =

Genus of fishes

Serpenticobitis, popularly known as serpent loaches, is a small genus of loaches found in the Mekong River Basin in Southeast Asia. It is the only genus in the family Serpenticobitidae.

== Species ==
Serpenticobitis contains the following species:

- Serpenticobitis cingulata T. R. Roberts, 1997
- Serpenticobitis octozona T. R. Roberts, 1997
- Serpenticobitis zonata Kottelat, 1998
