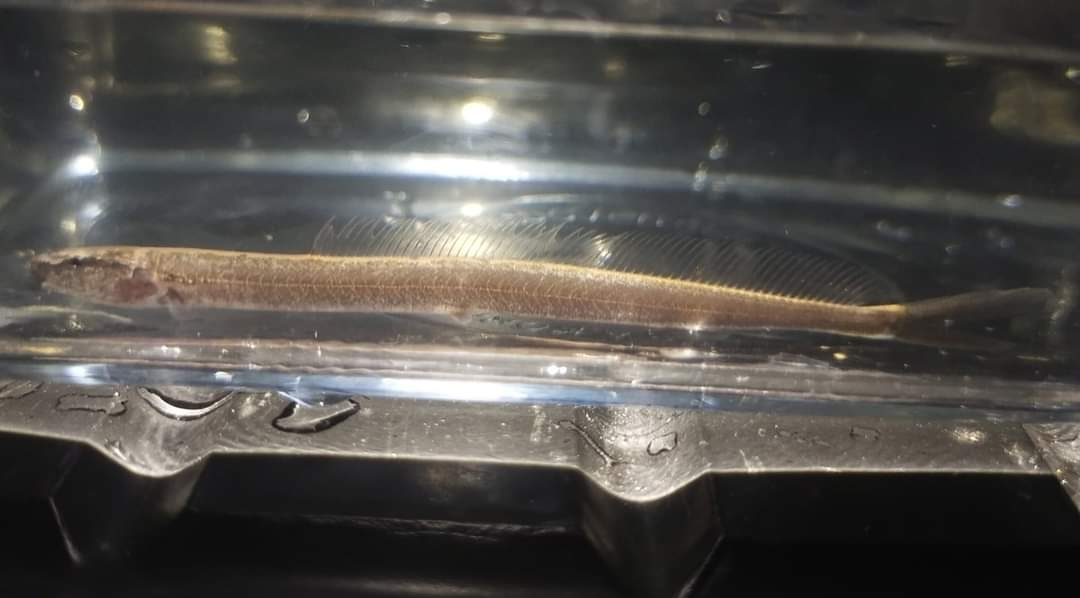

Conservation status
- Least Concern (IUCN 3.1)

Scientific classification
- Kingdom: Animalia
- Phylum: Chordata
- Class: Actinopterygii
- Order: Cypriniformes
- Family: Vaillantellidae
- Genus: Vaillantella
- Species: V. maassi

Binomial name
- Vaillantella maassi M. C. W. Weber & de Beaufort, 1912

Synonyms
- Vaillantella flavofasciata Tweedie, 1956

= Vaillantella maassi =

Species of fish

Vaillantella maassi, the forktail loach, is a species of loach in the family Vaillantellidae, a monogeneric family with two other species, Vaillantella cinnamomea and Vaillantella euepiptera. They are from Southeast Asia.

== Description ==
The genus Vaillantella is distinguished from all other loaches by its very long dorsal fin which has 59–73 rays and by its deeply forked caudal fin with a very elongated upper lobe. This species is distinguished from its congeners by the higher number of rays in the anal fin. It has an overall brown colour, Females are likely to be thicker bodied than males.

== Distribution ==
Vaillantella maassi ranges from Indonesia in Kalimantan and Sumatra and the Malay Peninsula as far north as the Tapi River basin and into southeastern Thailand.

== Habitat and ecology ==
Vaillantella maassi is found in the shallows at the margins of forest streams, often in streams originating in peat which contain "black water" although it can also occur in clear to turbid waters, with varying levels of tannin staining. The preferred habitat is normally shaded by the marginal vegetation and the forest canopy above. The water in these streams is usually low in dissolved minerals and can be quite acidic with a pH measured as low as 3.0 or 4.0 due to the level of tannins and acids released by the decomposition of plant matter. The substrates preferred are usually soft, such as sand, mud or peat and the loaches normally prefer to hide among piles of leaf litter. The currents in the streams this species occur in can be quite fast during the rainy season and where they are at higher altitude. Where they are sympatric with Vaillantella euepiptera, V. maassi appears to be restricted to higher altitude habitats than its congener.

It is a predatory species which hunts for insects, small crustaceans and other small invertebrates in the substrate. It is also known to take small fish and fish fry. They are territorial and the territory appears to be centred on a selected hiding place. Other than this very little is known about the behaviour of this species in the wild.

== Taxonomy and naming ==
Vaillantella maassi was described by the German-Dutch zoologist M. C. W. Weber and the Dutch biologist de Beaufort in 1912. The type (biology) was collected from the Kampar Kiri on Gunung Sahilan in central Sumatra in what was then the Dutch East Indies. The generic name honours Léon Vaillant, in an affectionate diminutive form by suffixing ella to his name, an ichthyologist at the Muséum national d'Histoire naturelle for his interest in and contribution to the knowledge of the fish of the East Indies. The specific name honours the German anthropologist Alfred Maass, the leader of an expedition to Sumatra which collected the type specimen.
