= Barbucca =

Scientific classification
- Kingdom: Animalia
- Phylum: Chordata
- Class: Actinopterygii
- Order: Cypriniformes
- Suborder: Cobitoidei
- Family: Barbuccidae; Kottelat, 2012
- Genus: Barbucca; T. R. Roberts, 1989

Type species
- Barbucca diabolica T. R. Roberts, 1989

Genus of fishes

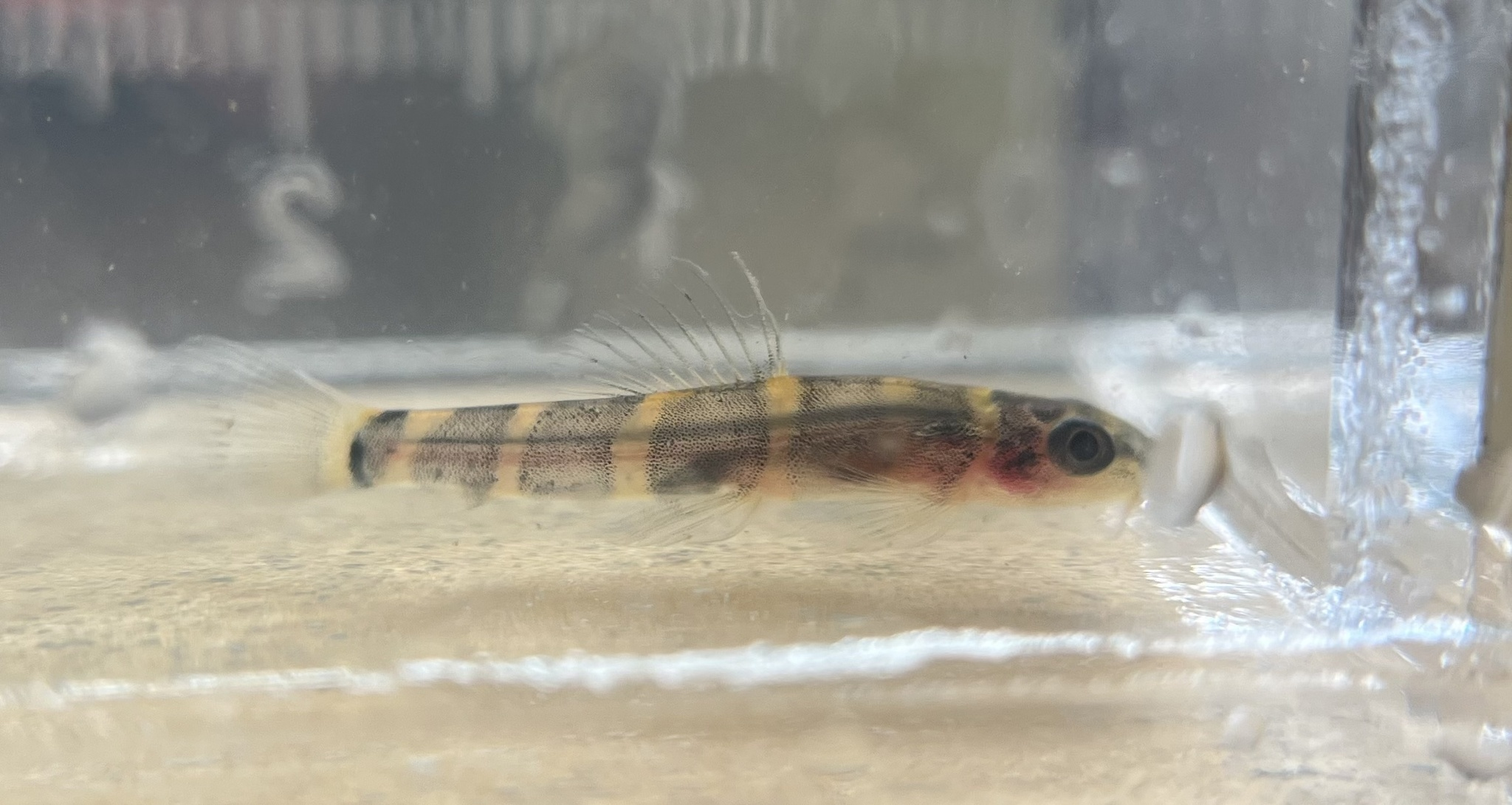
A Fire-eyed Loach (Barbucca diabolica)

Barbucca is a genus of loaches native to Southeast Asia. It is currently the only genus in its family.

== Species ==
There are currently three recognized species in this genus:

- Barbucca diabolica T. R. Roberts, 1989
- Barbucca elongata Vasil'eva & Vasil'ev, 2013
- Barbucca heokhuii Kottelat 2025
