= Glaniopsis =

Scientific classification
- Kingdom: Animalia
- Phylum: Chordata
- Class: Actinopterygii
- Order: Cypriniformes
- Family: Gastromyzontidae
- Genus: Glaniopsis; Boulenger, 1899

Type species
- Glaniopsis hanitschi Boulenger, 1899

Genus of fishes

Glaniopsis is a small genus of loaches endemic to the island of Borneo.

== Species ==
There are currently four recognized species in this genus:

- Glaniopsis denudata T. R. Roberts, 1982
- Glaniopsis gossei T. R. Roberts, 1982
- Glaniopsis hanitschi Boulenger, 1899
- Glaniopsis multiradiata T. R. Roberts, 1982
