= Erromyzon =

Scientific classification
- Kingdom: Animalia
- Phylum: Chordata
- Class: Actinopterygii
- Order: Cypriniformes
- Family: Gastromyzontidae
- Genus: Erromyzon; Kottelat, 2004

Type species
- Protomyzon sinensis Y. Y. Chen, 1980

Genus of fishes

Erromyzon is a genus of fish in the family Gastromyzontidae endemic to China and Vietnam.

== Species ==
There are currently 4 recognized species in this genus:

- Erromyzon compactus Kottelat, 2004
- Erromyzon kalotaenia J. Yang, Kottelat, J. X. Yang & X. Y. Chen, 2012
- Erromyzon sinensis (Y. Y. Chen, 1980)
- Erromyzon yangi Neely, Conway & Mayden, 2007
