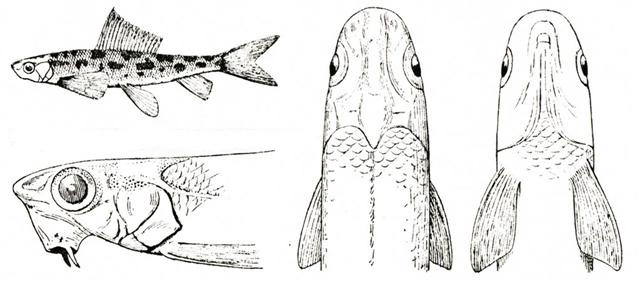
- Ellopostoma megalomycter

Scientific classification
- Kingdom: Animalia
- Phylum: Chordata
- Class: Actinopterygii
- Division: Teleostei
- Order: Cypriniformes
- Suborder: Cobitoidei
- Family: Ellopostomatidae; Bohlen & Šlechtová, 2009
- Genus: Ellopostoma; Vaillant, 1902

Type species
- Aperioptus megalomycter Vaillant, 1902

= Ellopostoma =

Genus of fishes

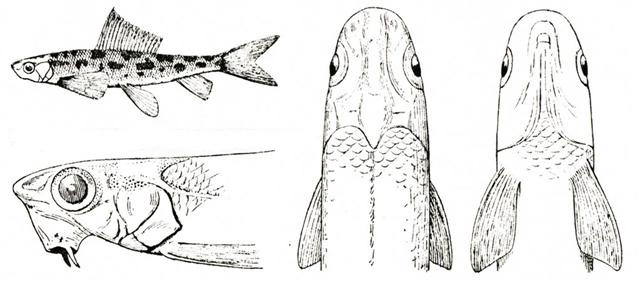
Ellopostoma megalomycter

Ellopostoma is a small genus of loaches native to Southeast Asia. This is the only genus in the family Ellopostomatidae, having been confirmed as being in a family of its own by M. Kottelat in his review of the loaches in 2012.

== Species ==
The currently recognized species in this genus are:

- Ellopostoma megalomycter (Vaillant, 1902)
- Ellopostoma mystax H. H. Tan & K. K. P. Lim, 2002 (enigmatic loach)
