= Beaufortia intermedia =

Scientific classification
- Domain: Eukaryota
- Kingdom: Animalia
- Phylum: Chordata
- Class: Actinopterygii
- Order: Cypriniformes
- Family: Gastromyzontidae
- Genus: Beaufortia
- Species: B. intermedia

Binomial name
- Beaufortia intermedia W. Q. Tang & D. Z. Wang, 1997

Species of fish

Beaufortia intermedia is a species of ray-finned fish in the genus Beaufortia.

== Footnotes ==
- Froese, Rainer; Pauly, Daniel (eds.). "Beaufortia intermedia". FishBase.
