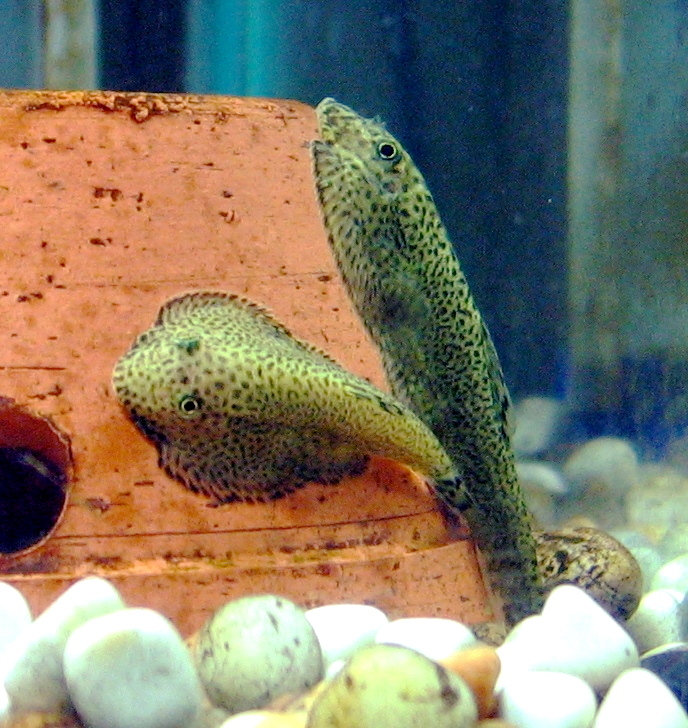

Scientific classification
- Kingdom: Animalia
- Phylum: Chordata
- Class: Actinopterygii
- Order: Cypriniformes
- Family: Gastromyzontidae
- Genus: Beaufortia
- Species: B. kweichowensis

Binomial name
- Beaufortia kweichowensis P. W. Fang, 1931

Synonyms
- Beaufortia leverreti kweichowensis (Fang, 1931); Beaufortia kweichowensis gracilicauda (Chen & Zheng, 1980); Gastromyzon leveretti kweichowensis Fang, 1931; Beaufortia kweichowensis kweichowensis (Fang, 1931)

= Beaufortia kweichowensis =

Chinese hillstream loach

Species of fish

Beaufortia kweichowensis is a species of gastromyzontid loach. It is endemic to China where it is known from the Xi River. The common names for this popular aquarium species are Chinese hillstream loach, Hong Kong pleco, butterfly hillstream loach, and Chinese sucker fish.

== Habitat ==
Beaufortia kweichowensis can be found in fast-flowing highland and in-land streams in China.

== In the aquarium ==
=== Aquarium maintenance ===
An aquarium that duplicates the natural habitat of the Chinese hillstream loach is ideal since these fish require high oxygen levels. They need excellent water-flow, adequate aeration and numerous hiding places inside the aquarium. Adequate lighting is necessary to promote algal growth in the aquarium. Other live plants, however, are not necessary although they may assist in maintaining water quality. Suitable plants for high-flow tank environments are Anubias species and Microsorum pteropus, which can be grown on rocks or driftwood.

Chinese hillstream loaches normally thrive in an aquatic environment with medium water hardness (12 dh maximum), with water temperatures from 68 to 75 °F (20 to 24 °C), and with pH readings ranging from 7.0 to 8.0. A tank size of 36 in (91 cm) minimum is preferable. They can be kept in groups of three to seven.

Chinese hillstream loaches can grow to 8 cm (3.1 in) total length.

=== Compatibility ===
B. kweichowensis is characteristically not too aggressive an aquarium fish, but like the Bornean Gastromyzon species, it is territorial and may engage in skirmishes or "topping", where one fish will try to cover another fish. These clashes seldom result in damage, because one fish will eventually cease from engaging in the topping behavior.

=== Feeding ===
Chinese hillstream loaches have small mouths thus necessitating the offering of good quality fish food such as flakes, sinking pellets, algae wafers, thawed frozen bloodworms, mysid shrimps, blanched spinach, kale and natural algae.

=== Breeding ===
There are minimal differences between males and females in Beaufortia kweichowensis but the males often display stronger coloration. Although B. kweichowensis are not normally bred in captivity, they may reproduce in pits under rocks inside tanks that mimic riverine settings.
