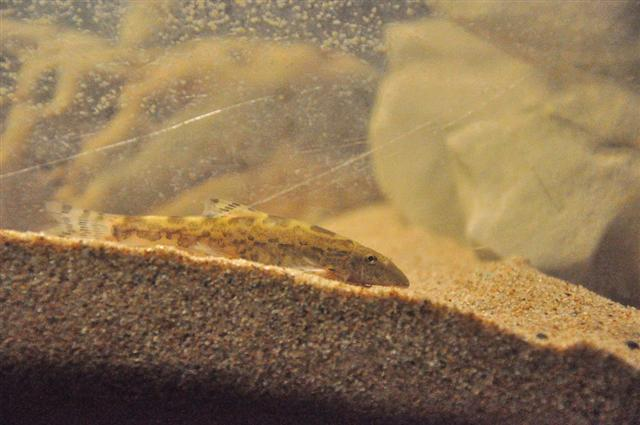
- Vanmanenia pingchowensis

Scientific classification
- Kingdom: Animalia
- Phylum: Chordata
- Class: Actinopterygii
- Order: Cypriniformes
- Family: Gastromyzontidae
- Genus: Vanmanenia; Hora, 1932

Type species
- Homalosoma stenosoma Boulenger, 1901

Synonyms
- Homalosoma Boulenger, 1901; Praeformosania P. W. Fang, 1935

= Vanmanenia =

Genus of fishes

Vanmanenia is a genus of loaches from China and mainland Southeast Asia.

== Species ==
There are currently 127 species recognized in this genus:

- Vanmanenia caldwelli Nichols, 1925
- Vanmanenia caobangensis V. H. Nguyễn, 2005
- Vanmanenia crassicauda Kottelat, 2000
- Vanmanenia duci Dang, Duong, Li, Nguyen & Tran, 2024
- Vanmanenia gymnetrus Yi-Yu Chen, 1980
- Vanmanenia hainanensis Yi-Yu Chen & C. Y. Zheng, 1980
- Vanmanenia homalocephala C. G. Zhang & Y. H. Zhao, 2000
- Vanmanenia intermedia (P. W. Fang)
- Vanmanenia lineata P. W. Fang, 1935
- Vanmanenia maculata W. J. Yi, E. Zhang & J. Z. Shen, 2014
- Vanmanenia marmorata Deng & Zhang, 2021
- Vanmanenia microcephala Li, Zhou & Che, 2019
- Vanmanenia microlepis V. H. Nguyễn, 2005
- Vanmanenia monofasciodorsala V. H. Nguyễn, 2005
- Vanmanenia multiloba Đ. Y. Mai, 1978
- Vanmanenia nahangensis V. H. Nguyễn, 2005
- Vanmanenia orcicampus Kottelat, 2017
- Vanmanenia pingchowensis P. W. Fang, 1935
- anmanenia polylepis Pan, Liu & Zheng, 1983
- Vanmanenia pseudostriata Zhu, Zhao, Liu & Niu, 2019
- Vanmanenia serrilineata Kottelat, 2000
- Vanmanenia stenosoma Boulenger, 1901
- Vanmanenia striata Yi-Yu Chen, 1980
- Vanmanenia tetraloba Đ. Y. Mai, 1978
- Vanmanenia trifasciodorsalata V. H. Nguyễn, 2005
- Vanmanenia ventrosquamata Đ. Y. Mai, 1978
- Vanmanenia xinyiensis C. Y. Zheng & Yi-Yu Chen, 1980
