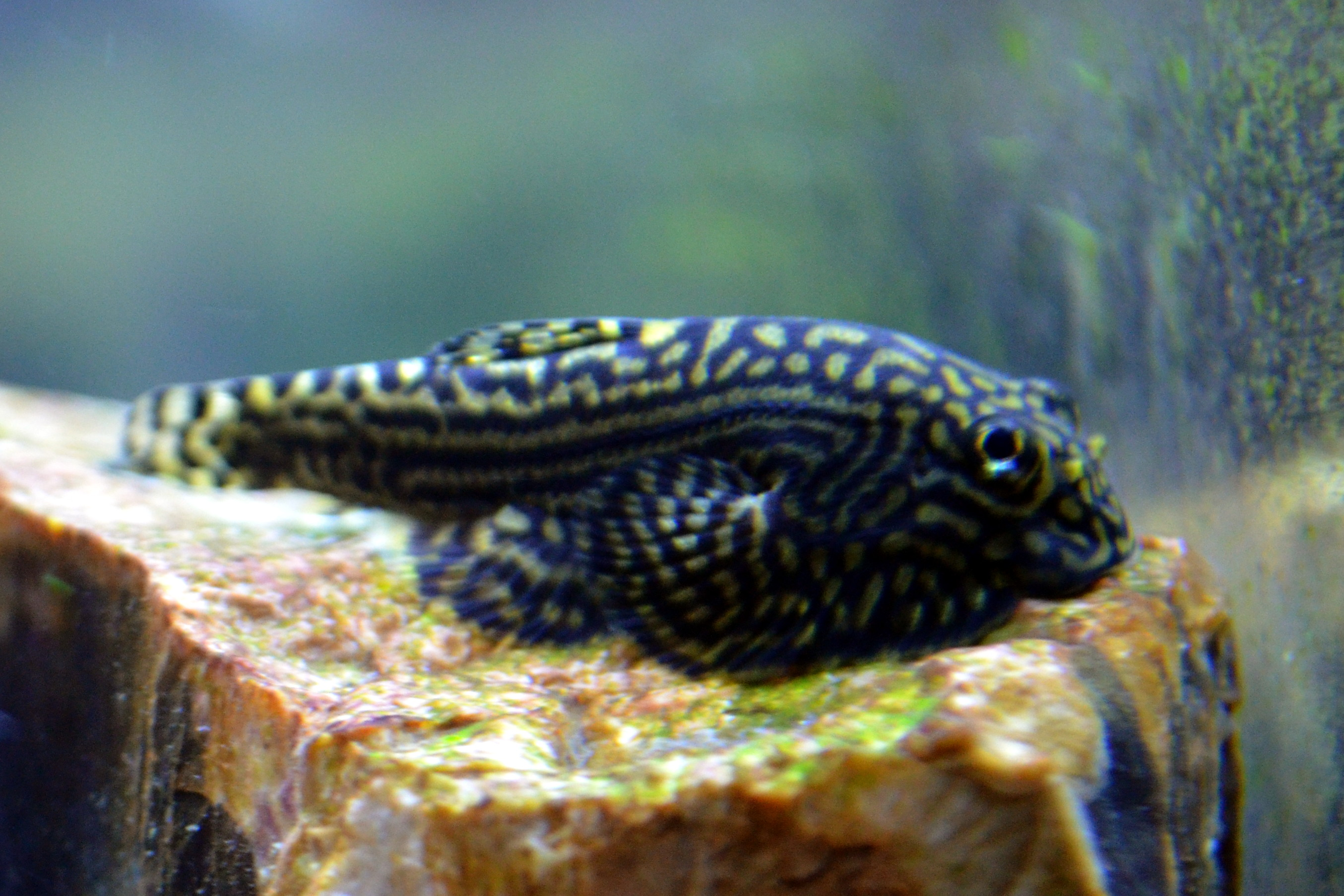
- Sewellia lineolata

Scientific classification
- Kingdom: Animalia
- Phylum: Chordata
- Class: Actinopterygii
- Order: Cypriniformes
- Family: Gastromyzontidae
- Genus: Sewellia; Hora, 1932

Type species
- Balitora lineolata Valenciennes, 1846

Synonyms
- Diardichthys T. R. Roberts, 1998; Parasewellia Nguyen & Nguyen, 2006

= Sewellia =

Genus of fishes

Sewellia is a genus of fish in the family Gastromyzontidae. They are commonly called hillstream loaches (a common name shared with family Balitoridae) and are found in Laos and Vietnam. According to Roberts (1998) a possible defining characteristic of the genus Sewellia is their posterior pelvic valve is highly complex and different from other rheophilic loaches (loaches adapted to fast flowing water), their posterior pelvic valve involves the overlapping of the second to last ventrally exposed rays. Adapted to high velocity streams, Sewellia have depressed body shapes that are laterally expanded, thus increasing their hydrodynamical properties and allowing them to better stay attached to rocks in swift current. Sewellia also have paired fins with a single simple ray and numerous branched rays allowing them to grip rocks in swift current.

== Distribution ==
Fish in the genus Sewellia occur in the Sekong River, a tributary of the Mekong river. The Sekong river drains large parts of central and southeast Laos as well as southern Vietnam.

== Habitat and ecology ==
Sewellia are found in the rapids and riffles of steep gradient 'hill streams', hence the common name Hillstream Loach. Due to their steep gradients these streams have high current velocities, Sewellia are known to inhabit streams with current velocities exceeding m/s in some habitats. Sewellia feed mainly on micro to macro sized aquatic invertebrates that inhabit the periphyton attached to submerged rocks.

== Sexual dimorphism ==
Sewellia are sexually dimorphic, males have soft elevated patches of fine tubercles on the anterior part of pectoral-fin rays 1-6, females do not. Sewellia lineolata are common in the aquaria trade, they are sexed based on differences in shape, at sexual maturity males tend to be more streamlined while females are somewhat broad; the beginning of the pectoral fins occurs at a much sharper angle in the male than females, females have pectoral fins that begin in a more rounded fashion (softer angle).

== Species ==
There are currently 13 recognized species in this genus:

- Sewellia albisuera Freyhof, 2003
- Sewellia analis H. D. Nguyễn & V. H. Nguyễn, 2005
- Sewellia breviventralis Freyhof & Serov, 2000
- Sewellia diardi T. R. Roberts, 1998
- Sewellia elongata T. R. Roberts, 1998
- Sewellia hypsicrateae Endruweit & T. D. P. Nguyễn, 2016
- Sewellia lineolata (Valenciennes, 1846)
- Sewellia marmorata Serov, 1996
- Sewellia media H. D. Nguyễn & V. H. Nguyễn, 2005
- Sewellia monolobata (H. D. Nguyễn & V. H. Nguyễn, 2006)
- Sewellia patella Freyhof & Serov, 2000
- Sewellia pterolineata T. R. Roberts, 1998
- Sewellia speciosa T. R. Roberts, 1998
- Sewellia trakhucensis H. D. Nguyễn & V. H. Nguyễn, 2005

== Conservation status ==
- Sewellia albisuera - IUCN Critically Endangered
- Sewellia analis - IUCN Not Evaluated
- Sewellia breviventralis - IUCN Critically Endangered
- Sewellia diardi - IUCN Data Deficient
- Sewellia elongata - IUCN Near Threatened
- Sewellia hypsicrateae - IUCN Not Evaluated
- Sewellia lineolata - IUCN Vulnerable
- Sewellia marmorata - IUCN Endangered
- Sewellia medius - IUCN Not Evaluated
- Sewellia patella - IUCN Endangered
- Sewellia pterolineata - IUCN Endangered
- Sewellia speciosa - IUCN Least Concern
- Sewellia trakhucensis - IUCN Not Evaluated
