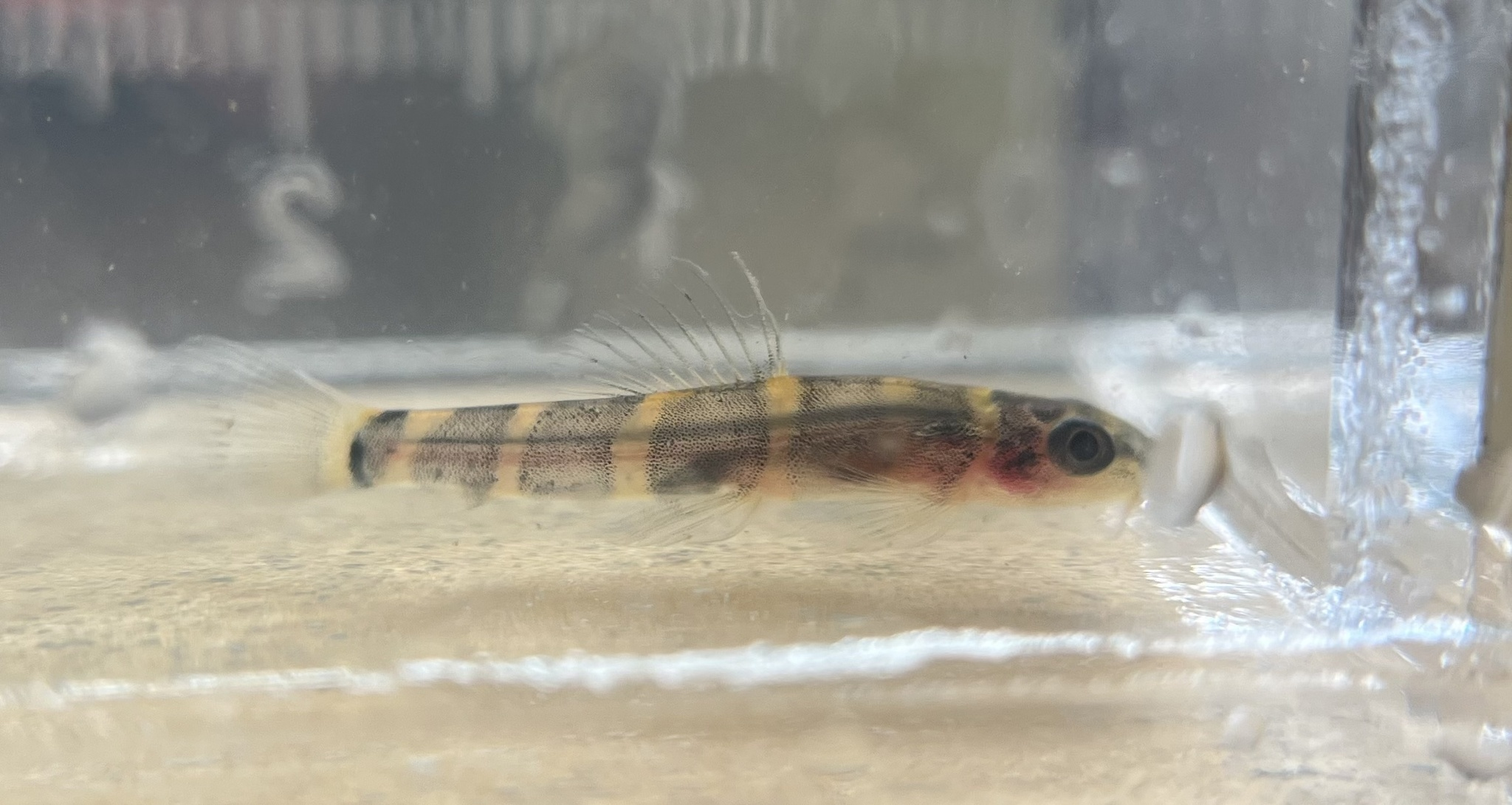

Conservation status
- Least Concern (IUCN 3.1)

Scientific classification
- Kingdom: Animalia
- Phylum: Chordata
- Class: Actinopterygii
- Order: Cypriniformes
- Family: Barbuccidae
- Genus: Barbucca
- Species: B. diabolica

Binomial name
- Barbucca diabolica T. R. Roberts, 1989

= Barbucca diabolica =

Species of fish

Barbucca diabolica, the fire-eyed loach, is a very small loach native to the Malay Peninsula, Borneo and Thailand. It can be found in small forest streams and backwaters, where it eats algae, detritus and small invertebrates. It can reach a length of 2.3 cm (0.91 in). The population is unknown but is considered to be declining sharply in Thailand; it is threatened by forest loss and stream modification. It exists in protected areas but it may be confused with other species so clarification is needed.
