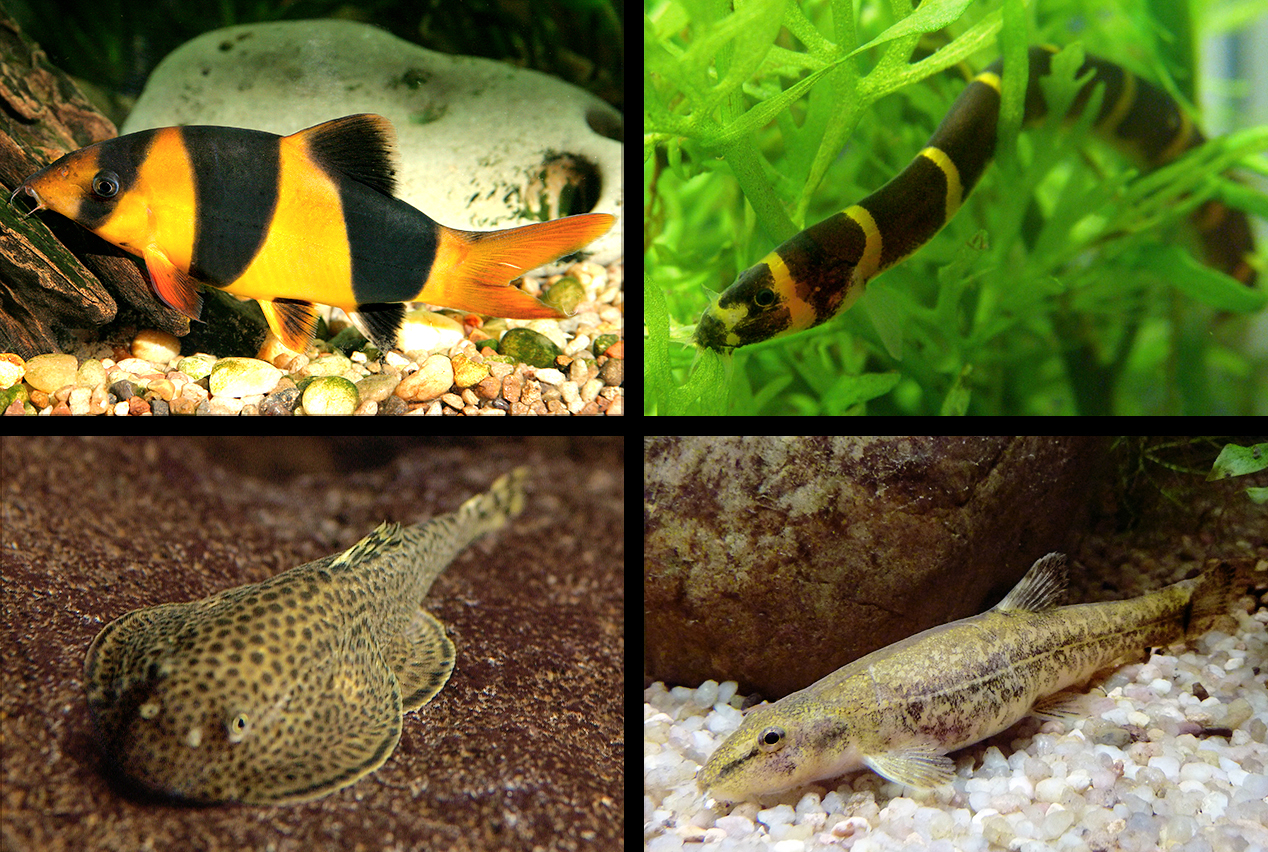
- Examples of several loach families

Scientific classification
- Kingdom: Animalia
- Phylum: Chordata
- Class: Actinopterygii
- Division: Teleostei
- Order: Cypriniformes
- Suborder: Cobitoidei; Fitzinger, 1832

Families
- see text

= Loach =

Loaches Temporal range: Oligocene–recent

Suborder of ray-finned fish

Loaches are ray-finned fishes of the suborder Cobitoidei. They are freshwater, benthic (bottom-dwelling) fish found in rivers and creeks throughout Eurasia and northern Africa. Loaches are among the most diverse groups of fish; the 1249 known species of Cobitoidei make up about 107 genera divided among 9 families.

== Etymology ==
Loach is derived from the Old French "loche," with unclear origin.

The name Cobitoidei comes from the type genus, Cobitis, described by Carl Linnaeus in his landmark 1758 10th edition of Systema Naturae. However, its origin predates modern zoological nomenclature and derives from a term used by Aristotle to refer to "small fishes that bury... like the gudgeon."

== Description ==
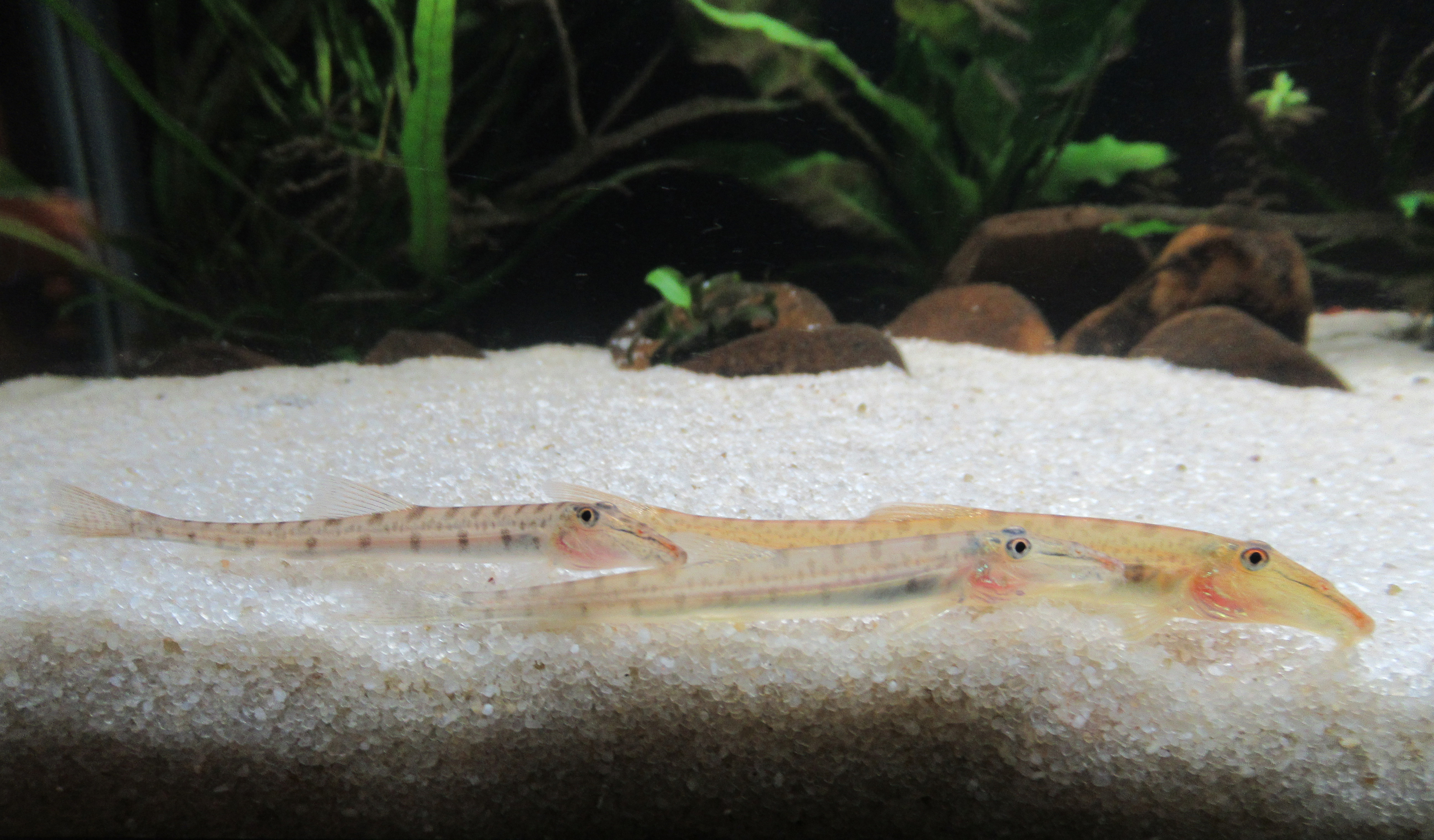
Common horseface loach Acantopsis rungthipae

Loaches display a wide variety of morphologies, making the group difficult to characterize as a whole using external traits. They range in adult length from the 23 mm (1 in) miniature eel-loach, Pangio longimanus, to the 50 cm (20 in) imperial flower loach, Leptobotia elongata, with the latter weighing up to 3 kg (6.6 lbs). Most loaches are small, narrow-bodied and elongate, with minute cycloid scales that are often embedded under the skin, patterns of brown-to-black pigment along the dorsal surface and sides, and three or more pairs of whisker-like barbels at the mouth. The type species of the family Cobitidae, Cobitis taenia, has a body shape and pigment pattern typical of Cobitoidei. However, many loaches are eel-like or conversely, quite stout-bodied; some balitorids have large, visible scales.

Loaches in the families Cobitidae, Botiidae, and Serpenticobitidae possess a bifid, protrusible spine below the eye, or in the case of the genus Acantopsis, between the eye and the tip of the snout.

== Taxonomy ==
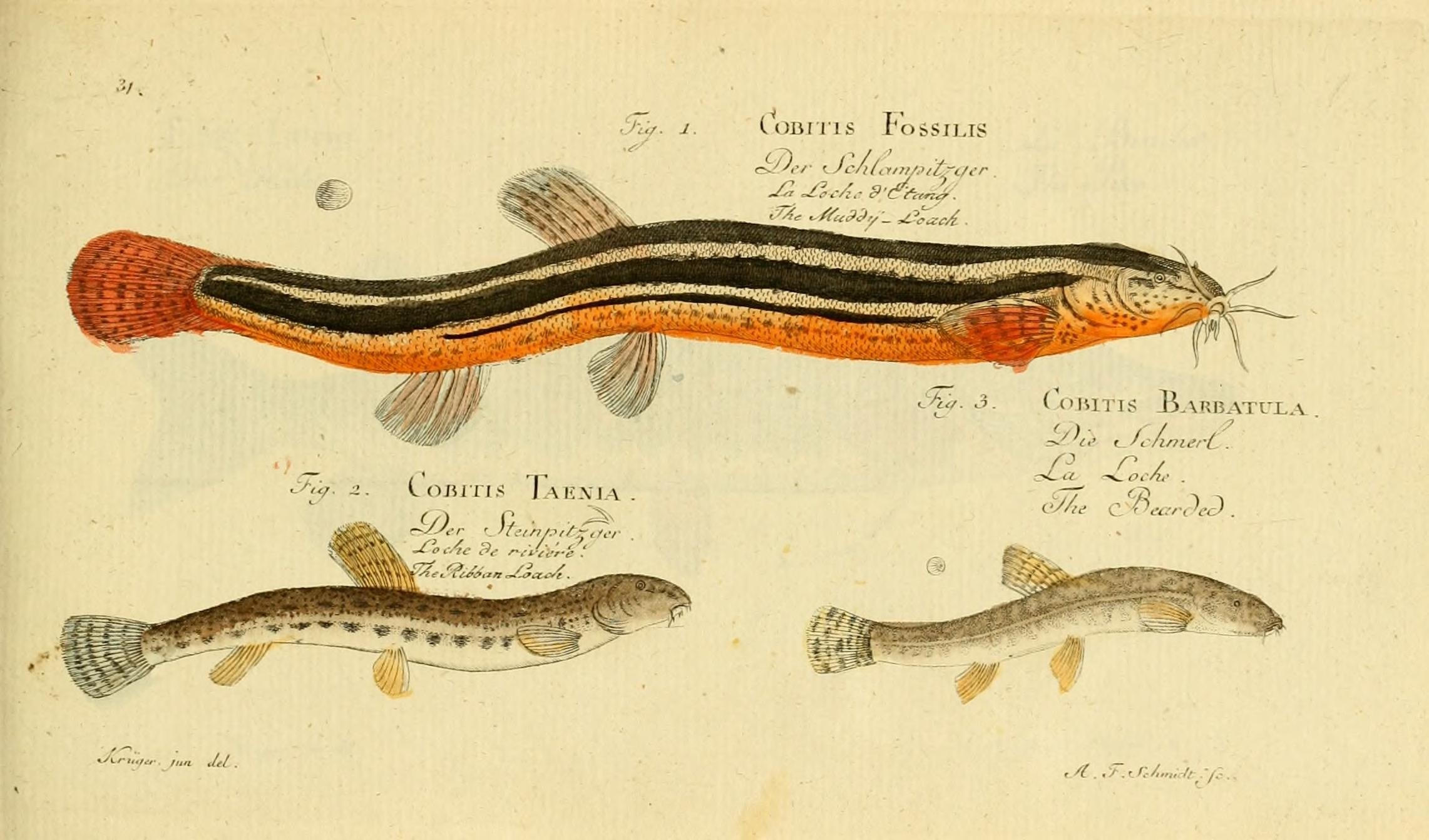
Cobitis species described by Linnaeus

=== Classification ===
Cobitoidei is a suborder within the order Cypriniformes, one of the most diverse groups of vertebrates. The order is commonly known as "minnows, carps, loaches, and relatives," and has included the suckers (Catostomidae) and algae eaters (Gyrinocheilidae), these are now regarded as separate suborders, the Gyrinocheiloidei and the Catostomoidei. Members of the latter family, which contains only a single genus Gyrinocheilus, are sometimes referred to as sucking loaches. It is uncertain if Gyrinocheilidae, or a clade containing both Gyrinocheilidae and Catostomidae, is sister to Cobitoidei.

Eschmeyer's Catalog of Fishes classifies the families in the suborder as follows:

- Suborder Cobitoidei Fitzinger, 1832
  - Family Botiidae Berg, 1940 (pointface loaches)
  - Family Vaillantellidae Nalbant & Bănărescu, 1977 (longfin loaches)
  - Family Cobitidae Swainson, 1838 (spined loaches)
  - Family Barbuccidae Kottelat, 2012 (scooter loaches)
  - Family Gastromyzontidae Fowler, 1905 (hillstream loaches)
  - Family Serpenticobitidae Kottelat, 2012 (snake loaches)
  - Family Balitoridae Swainson, 1839 (river loaches)
  - Family Ellopostomatidae Bohlen & Šlechtová, 2009 (square-head loaches)
  - Family Nemacheilidae Regan, 1911 (brook loaches)

==== History of classification ====
At the turn of the 20th century only two families of loaches had been described, and of these only Cobitidae was widely recognized by taxonomists. In the early 1900s, the American ichthyologist Fowler and the Indian ichthyologist Hora recognized what would come to be known as Balitoridae and Gastromyzontidae. Nemachelidae, and later Botiidae, were described as subfamilies of Cobitidae until their elevation to family status in 2002. Owing to shared morphological characteristics (see osteology, below) the relationship of the botiid and cobitid loaches was particularly difficult to resolve until the advent of molecular phylogenetics. Three of the nine families, containing only two or three species apiece, were recognized within the last ten years.

=== Phylogeny ===
Reproduction of molecular phylogeny of Cobitoidea from Bohlen & Šlechtová, 2009, with common names following Eschmeyer's Catalog of Fishes.

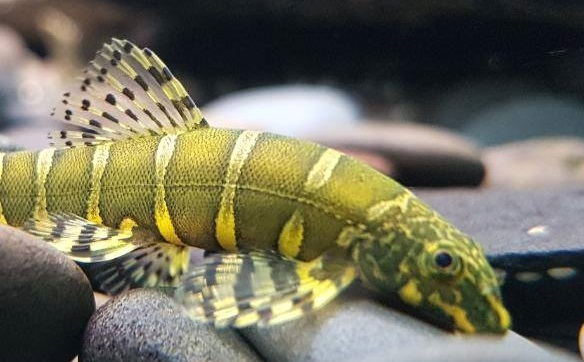
Serpent loach Serpenticobitis cingulata

- - Gyrinocheilidae Gill 1905 algae eaters
  - Cobitoidea
    - Botiidae Berg 1940 pointface loaches
    - - Vaillantellidae Nalbant & Bănărescu 1977 longfin loaches
      - - Cobitidae Swainson 1838 true or spined loaches
        - - Ellopostomatidae Bohlen & Šlechtová 2009 squarehead loaches
          - Nemacheilidae Regan 1911 brook loaches
          - - Barbuccidae Kottelat 2012 scooter loaches
            - - Balitoridae Swainson 1839 river loaches
              - - Serpenticobitidae Kottelat 2012 serpent loaches
                - Gastromyzontidae Fowler 1905 hillstream loaches

=== Osteology ===
Among loaches, the majority of known morphological synapomorphies (shared characters derived from a common ancestor) are osteological. In particular, modifications to the ethmoid and surrounding bones within the neurocranium unite Cobitoidei, in addition to certain lateral-line canal ossifications. An erectile suborbital spine, a modification of the lateral ethmoid, was formerly thought to represent a synapomorphy between Cobitidae and Botiidae. It is now considered a pleisiomorphy of Cobitoidei, a character shared by the common ancestor but lost in most loach lineages. The suborbital spine is also retained in the serpent loaches, Serpenticobitidae.

== Habitat and distribution ==
Loaches are found in a wide variety of habitats throughout Europe, northern Africa, and central and Southeast Asia. Most families occur predominantly in rocky mountain streams at high elevations, but almost all have lowland representatives as well. Many species of Cobitidae burrow in the sand and inhabit riverbeds in broad, flat terrain. At least three families contain blind, troglomorphic species adapted to life in caves.

== Relationship with humans ==
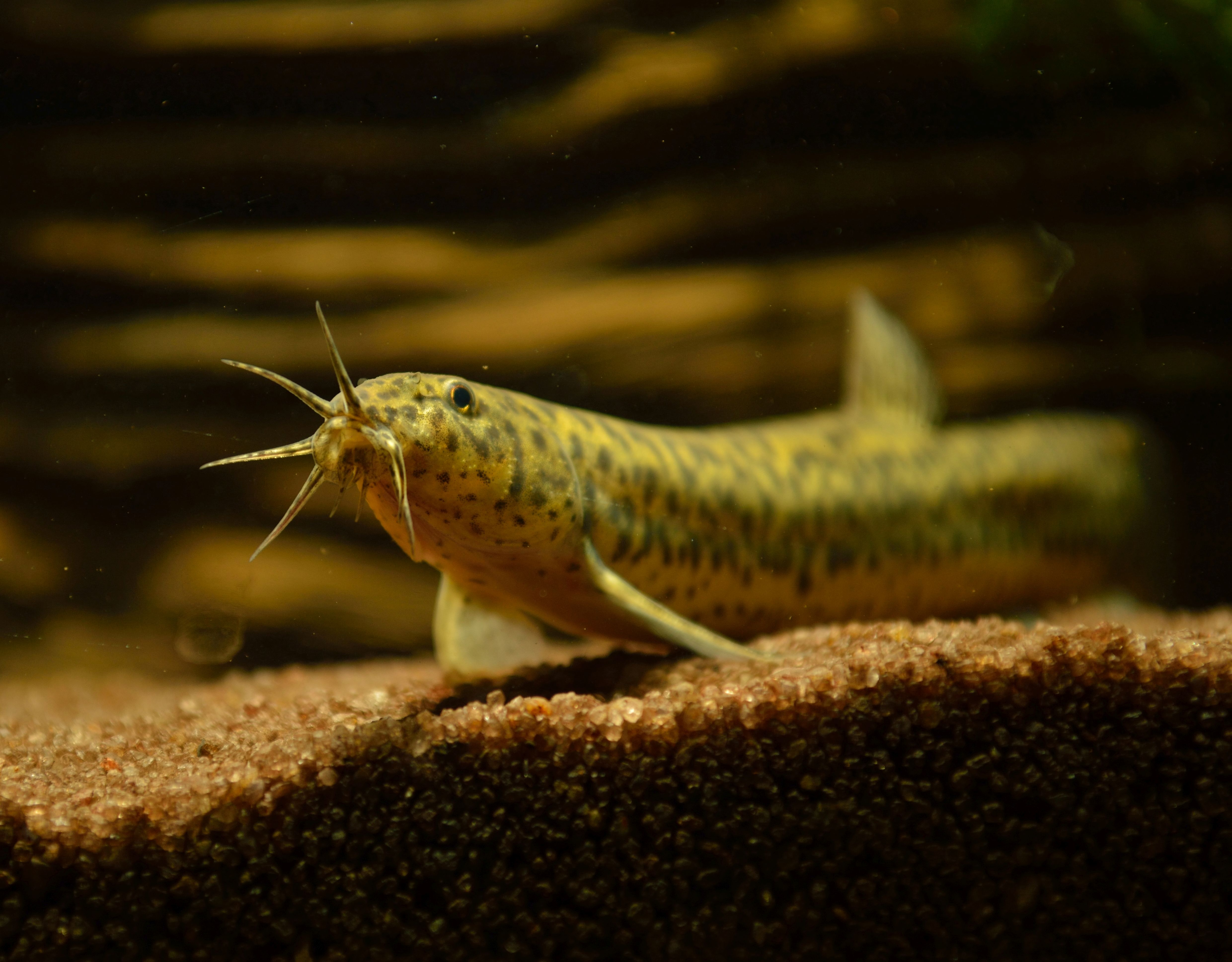
The oriental weatherfish or pond loach is widely introduced outside its native range

Some loaches are important food fish, especially in East and Southeast Asia where they are a common sight in markets.

Loaches are popular in the aquarium trade. Loaches are fed sinking discs designed for them in the aquarium. Some of the most well-known examples are the clown loach (Chromobotia macracanthus), the kuhli loach (Pangio kuhlii), and the dwarf chain loach (Ambastaia sidthimunki). Botiid and gastromyzontid loaches also occasionally make their way into the trade.

Although loaches have a strictly Old World native distribution, the oriental weatherfish, Misgurnus anguillicaudatus, (also known as the dojo loach) has been introduced in parts of the United States.
