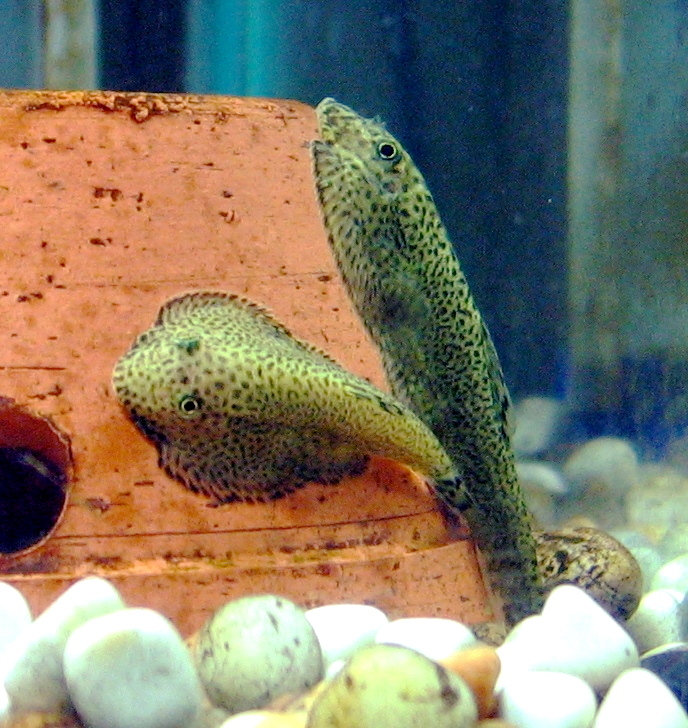
- Beaufortia kweichowensis

Scientific classification
- Kingdom: Animalia
- Phylum: Chordata
- Class: Actinopterygii
- Order: Cypriniformes
- Suborder: Cobitoidei
- Family: Gastromyzontidae; Fowler, 1905

Genera
- see text

= Gastromyzontidae =

Family of fishes

The Gastromyzontidae are a family of loaches native to China and Southeast Asia, where typically found in streams and rivers with a fast current. The family includes about 137 species in eighteen genera. This family was resurrected by M. Kottelat in his review and revision of the loaches in 2012. They are commonly called hillstream loaches (a name shared with Balitoridae).

== Genera ==
Gastromyzontidae contains the following genera:

- Annamia Hora, 1932
- Bashimyzon X. Gong & E. Zhang, 2024
- Beaufortia Hora, 1932
- Engkaria H. H. Tan, 2021
- Erromyzon Kottelat, 2004
- Formosania Ōshima, 1919
- Gastromyzon Günther, 1874
- Glaniopsis Boulenger, 1899
- Hypergastromyzon T. R. Roberts 1989
- Katibasia Kottelat, 2004
- Labigastromyzon W.-Q. Tang & Y.-Y. Chen, 1996
- Liniparhomaloptera P.-W. Fang, 1935
- Neogastromyzon Popta, 1905
- Paraprotomyzon Pellegrin & P.-W. Fang, 1935
- Parhomaloptera Vaillant, 1902
- Plesiomyzon C.-Y. Zheng & Y.-Y. Chen, 1980
- Protomyzon Hora, 1932
- Pseudogastromyzon Nichols, 1925
- Sewellia Hora, 1932
- Vanmanenia Hora, 1932
- Yaoshania J. Yang, Kottelat, J.-X. Yang & X.-Y. Chen, 2012
