= List of mammals of Texas =

Topographic map of Texas

This is a list of mammals of Texas. Mammals native to or immediately off the coast of the U.S. state of Texas are listed first. Introduced mammals, whether intentional or unintentional, are listed separately.

The varying geography of Texas, the second largest state, provides a large variety of habitats for mammals. The land varies from swamps, Piney Woods in the east, rocky hills and limestone karst in the central Hill Country of the Edwards Plateau, desert in the south and west, mountains in the far west (the Trans-Pecos), and grassland prairie in the north, also known as the Panhandle. The state's many rivers, including the Rio Grande, the Colorado River, and the Trinity River, also provide diverse river habitats. Its central position in the United States means that species found primarily in either the western or eastern reaches of the country often have their ranges meeting in the state. Additionally, its proximity to Mexico is such that many species found there and into Central America also range as far north as Texas.

Texas recognizes three official mammals: the Mexican long-nosed armadillo, the Texas Longhorn, and the Mexican free-tailed bat. State law protects numerous species. The state also recognizes the Texas State Bison Herd at Caprock Canyons State Park since 2011, the state Longhorn herd at multiple state parks since 1969, and the state dog breed, Blue Lacy since 2005.

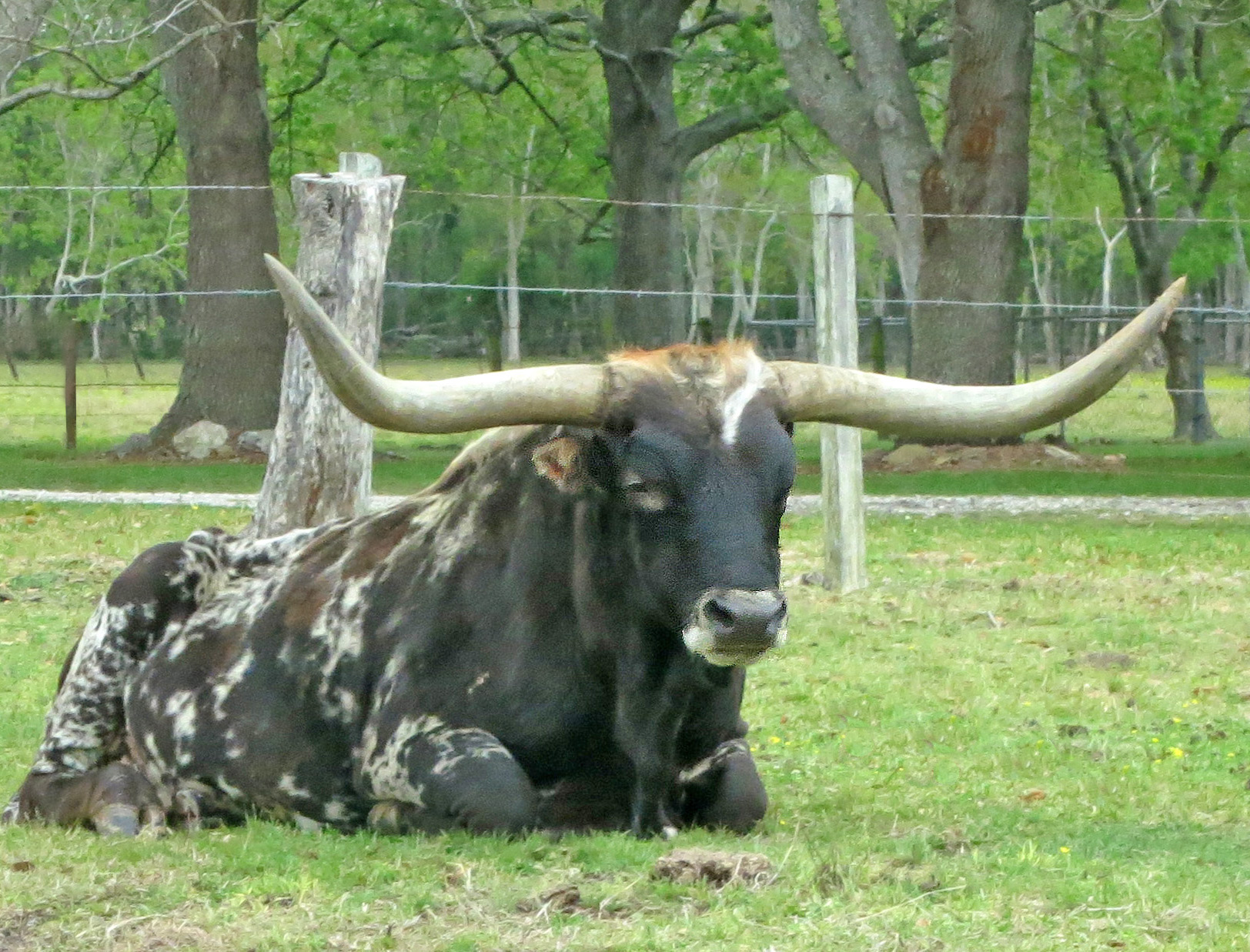
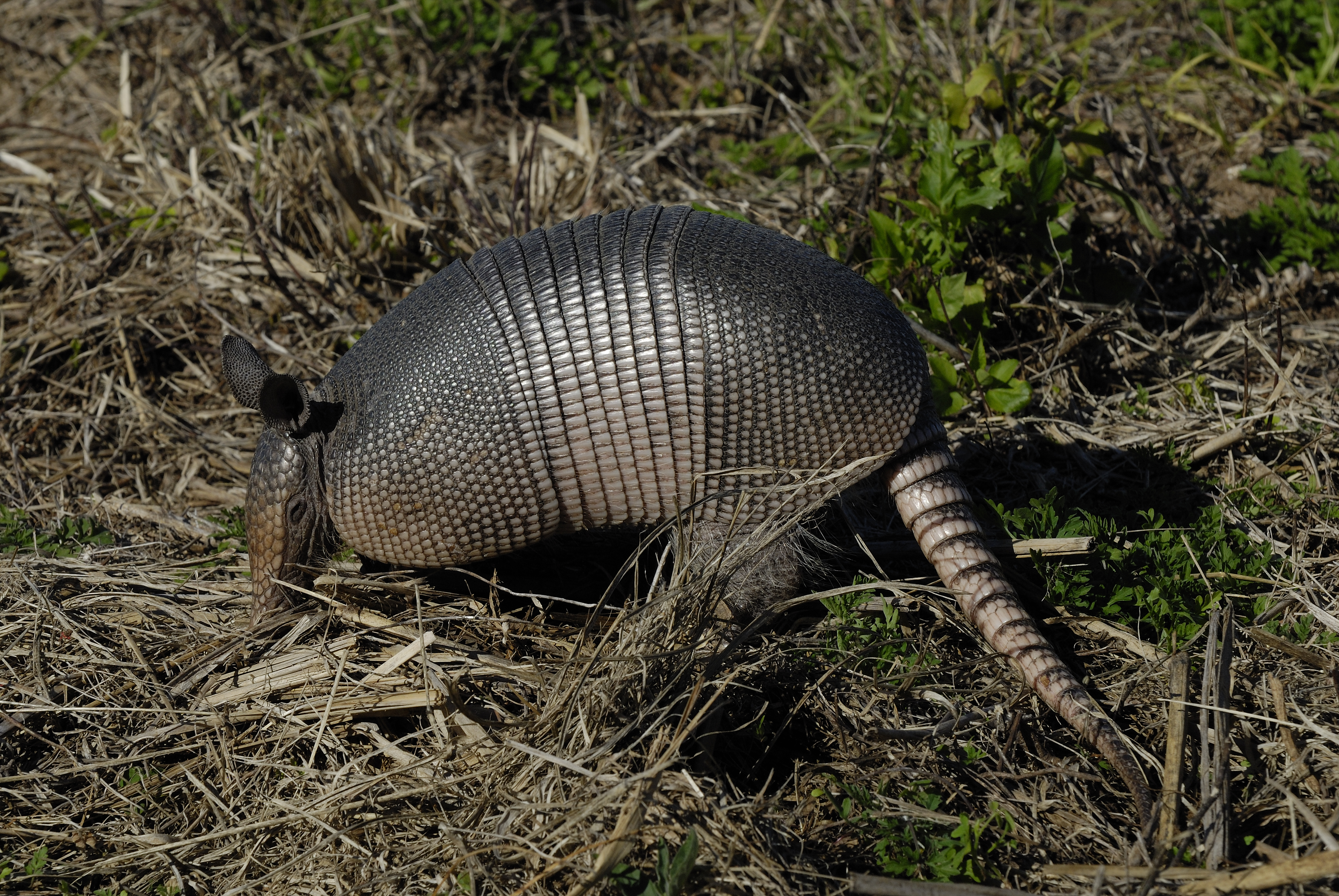
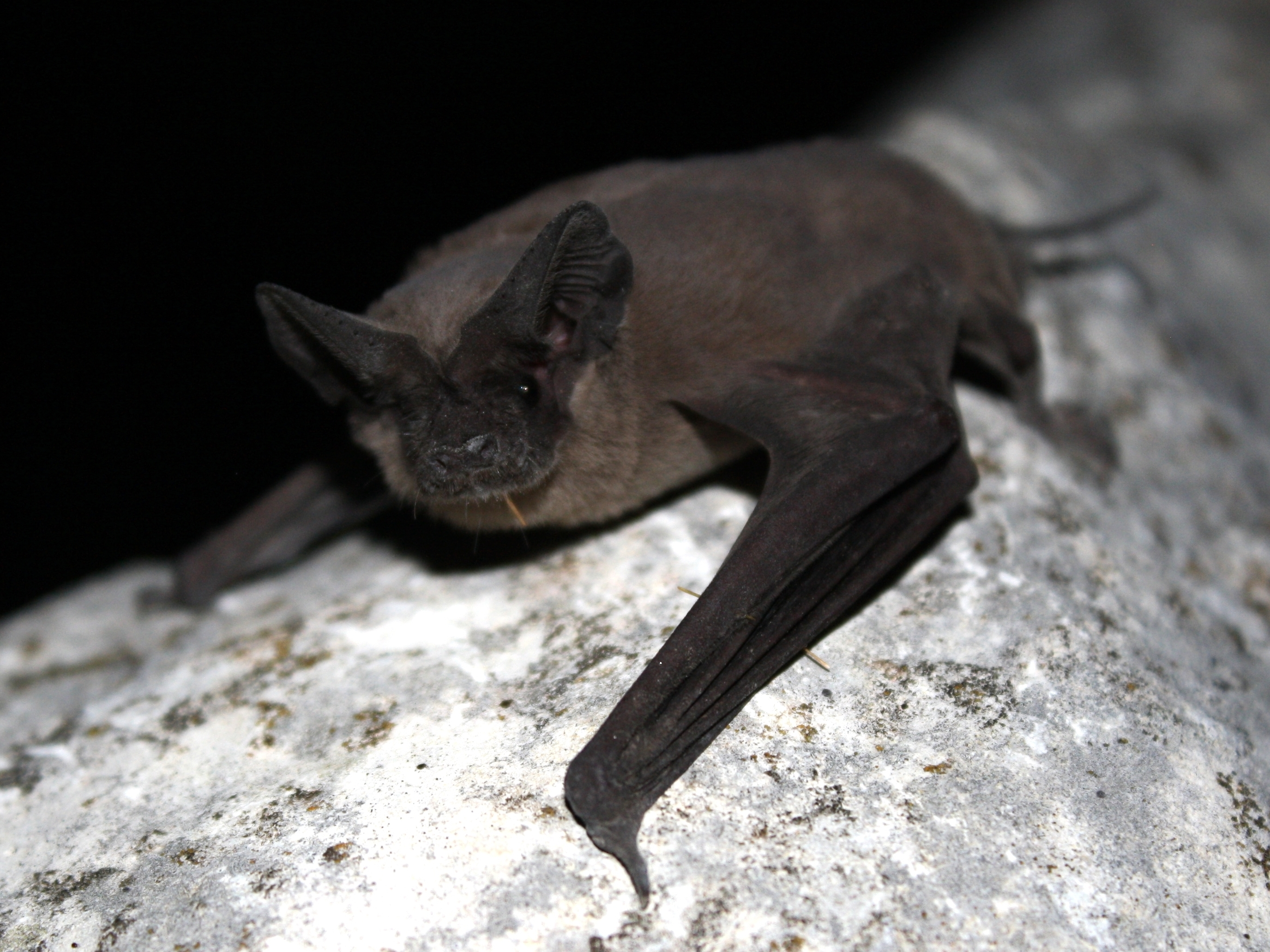
The state mammals were all named by the legislature in 1995.

== List of species ==
=== Order Xenarthra ===
==== Dasypodidae ====
Dasypodidae is a family of armoured mammals found mainly in Latin America.

Dasypodidae
Species	Common name	Distribution	Status	Image
Dasypus novemcinctus	Mexican long-nosed armadillo	Found in all of Texas, except the Trans-Pecos region	LC	

=== Order Chiroptera ===
==== Phyllostomidae ====
Phyllostomidae
Species	Common name	Distribution	Status	Image
Choeronycteris mexicana	Mexican long-tongued bat	Only found in South Texas; may be slowly increasing distribution northward.	NT	
Diphylla ecaudata	Hairy-legged vampire bat	Only one specimen found in 1967, in Val Verde County.	LC	
Leptonycteris nivalis	Greater long-nosed bat	Only found in Presidio County and Brewster County.	EN	

==== Mormoopidae ====
Mormoopidae
Species	Common name	Distribution	Status	Image
Mormoops megalophylla	Ghost-faced bat	Found in the Trans-Pecos, South Texas Plains, and the southern edge of the Edwards Plateau.	LC	

==== Vespertilionidae ====
Vespertilionidae
Species	Common name	Distribution	Status	Image
Aeorestes cinereus	Hoary bat	Found in mature forested areas across the state	LC	
Antrozous pallidus	Pallid bat	Commonly found in the western half of Texas, including the panhandle.	LC	
Corynorhinus rafinesquii	Rafinesque's big-eared bat	Found in small localities in the Pineywoods of East Texas.	LC	
Corynorhinus townsendii	Townsend's big-eared bat	Commonly found in the western half of Texas, including the panhandle. Population in West Texas and Panhandle are divided into subspecies.	LC	
Dasypterus ega	Southern yellow bat	Found in seven counties in the Rio Grande Valley.	LC	
Dasypterus intermedius	Northern yellow bat	Occurs in the eastern and southern part of the state, including along the coast.	LC	
Dasypterus xanthinus	Western yellow bat	Reported in the southernmost counties of Texas surrounding Big Bend National Park.	LC	
Eptesicus fuscus	Big brown bat	Found primarily iy the eastern, northern and western parts of the state.	LC	
Euderma maculatum	Spotted bat	Found only in Big Bend National Park.	LC	
Lasionycteris noctivagans	Silver-haired bat	Found in forested areas across the state, not seen often in cities.	LC	
Lasiurus blossevillii	Desert red bat	One specimen found in Presidio County in 1988	LC	
Lasiurus borealis	Eastern red bat	Found state-wide, but most commonly found in the eastern and central part of the state	LC	
Lasiurus seminolus	Seminole bat	Found in the eastern part of the state	LC	
Myotis austroriparius	Southeastern myotis	Found in eastern Texas caves	LC	
Myotis californicus	California myotis	Found primarily in the Chihuahuan Desert and Trans-Pecos region of Texas	LC	
Myotis ciliolabrum	Western small-footed myotis	Found primarily in the Trans-Pecos mountains and small populations in the panhandle	LC	
Myotis occultus	Arizona myotis	One found in Hudspeth Co., likely a migrant individual.	LC	
Myotis septentrionalis	Northern long-eared myotis	Only one specimen ever found in Dimmit Co.	NT	
Myotis thysanodes	Fringed myotis	Found in the Trans-Pecos region, with one migrant specimen collected in the Panhandle.	LC	
Myotis velifer	Cave myotis	Found in most areas in Texas except the Pineywoods.	LC	
Myotis volans	Long-legged myotis	Found in the Trans-Pecos region, with one migrant specimen collected in the Panhandle.	LC	
Myotis yumanensis	Yuma myotis	Found in south Texas along the Rio Grande River.	LC	
Nycticeius humeralis	Evening bat	Found widespread throughout the state except for the Panhandle, with westward expansion of their range.	LC	
Parastrellus hesperus	Canyon bat	Found in the western half of the state, especially the Trans-Pecos Mountains.	LC	
Perimyotis subflavus	Tricolored bat	Found in most regions of Texas except the Trans-Pecos.	VU	

==== Molossidae ====
Molossidae
Species	Common name	Distribution	Status	Image
Eumops perotis	Western mastiff bat	Found in Val Verde, Terrell, Brewster, and Presidio counties in South Texas and in Midland County in the west	LC	
Nyctinomops femorosacca	Pocketed free-tailed bat	Found in Val Verde, Terrell, Brewster, and Presidio counties in South Texas.	LC	
Nyctinomops macrotis	Big free-tailed bat	Scattered localities in the Panhandle, Trans-Pecos region, and recently in Wise County	LC	
Molossus molossus	Velvety free-tailed bat	Vagrant	LC	
Tadarida brasiliensis	Mexican free-tailed bat	State-wide distribution in the summer, with the eastern population being year-round residents	LC	

=== Order Carnivora ===
==== Canidae ====
Canidae
Species	Common name	Distribution	Status	Image
Canis latrans	Coyote	ubiquitous throughout Texas	LC	
Canis lupus	Gray wolf	all subspecies previously found in Texas are either extinct or extirpated; see below	LC	
C. l. baileyi	Mexican wolf	extirpated	EN	
C. l. monstrabilis	Texas gray wolf	extinct	EX	
C. l. nubilus	Great Plains wolf	extirpated		
Canis rufus	Red wolf	the two subspecies previously found in Texas are extinct and extirpated; see below	CR	
C. r. rufus	Texas red wolf	extinct	EX	
C. r. gregoryi	Mississippi Valley red wolf	extirpated	CR	
Urocyon cinereoargenteus	Gray fox	Ubiquitous throughout Texas.	LC	
Vulpes macrotis	Kit fox	Found in the Trans-Pecos and Edwards Plateau regions.	LC	
Vulpes velox	Swift fox	Found in the Panhandle region.	LC	

==== Felidae ====
Felidae
Species	Common name	Distribution	Status	Image
Herpailurus yagouaroundi	Jaguarundi	Extirpated; Last U.S. sighting in 1986 in Brownsville.	LC	
Leopardus pardalis	Ocelot	Only found in and around Laguna Atascosa National Wildlife Refuge	LC	
Leopardus wiedii	Margay	Extirpated; Only U.S. record found in 1852 outside Kingsville.	NT	
Lynx rufus	Bobcat	ubiquitous throughout Texas	LC	
Panthera onca	Jaguar	Extirpated by 1948.	NT	
Puma concolor	Cougar	Western counties only	LC	

==== Procyonidae ====
Procyonidae
Species	Common name	Distribution	Status	Image
Bassariscus astutus	Ring-tailed cat	Common in the Trans-Pecos, Edwards Plateau and Cross Timbers ecoregions, but also seen statewide except the panhandle	LC	
Nasua narica	White-nosed coati	Recently, only seen in the Big Bend and Padre Island regions	LC	
Procyon lotor	Raccoon	Ubiquitous throughout Texas	LC	

==== Mephitidae ====
Mephitidae
Species	Common name	Distribution	Status	Image
Conepatus leuconotus	American hog-nosed skunk	Found throughout central and southern Texas.	LC	
Mephitis macroura	Hooded skunk	Found in the central Trans-Pecos region.	LC	
Mephitis mephitis	Striped skunk	Ubiquitous throughout Texas.	LC	
Spilogale gracilis	Western spotted skunk	Found in the southwestern part of the state, north to Garza Co. and east to Duvall Co.	LC	
Spilogale putorius	Eastern spotted skunk	Found in the eastern half of the state and up into the Panhandle. Somewhat rare.	VU	

==== Mustelidae ====
Mustelidae
Species	Common name	Distribution	Status	Image
Lontra canadensis	North American river otter	Found historically along tributaries and rivers of the Red River. Has been limited further east, but recently found as far west as Abilene.	LC	
Mustela nigripes	Black-footed ferret	Extirpated. Before extirpation, was found wherever prairie dogs were in the Panhandle.	EN	
Neogale frenata	Long-tailed weasel	Secretive species with few scientific records across the state. Found in a variety of habitats where water is present. Not found in the northern Panhandle.	LC	
Neogale vison	American mink	Found in the eastern half of the state where water is present.	LC	
Taxidea taxus	American badger	Found throughout the state except the far eastern Pineywoods.Habitat loss pushes it further east.	LC	

==== Phocidae ====
Phocidae
Species	Common name	Distribution	Status	Image
Neomonachus tropicalis	Caribbean monk seal	extinct	EX	

==== Ursidae ====
Ursidae
Species	Common name	Distribution	Status	Image
Ursus americanus	American black bear	Found in the forested areas of east Texas, the Trans-Pecos region, and at the tip of the Panhandle	LC	
Ursus arctos	Brown bear	all populations once present in Texas are either extirpated or extinct; see below	LC	
U. a. horribilis	Grizzly bear	extirpated; the only documented grizzly bear (U. a. horribilis) specimen was killed in 1905 in Jeff Davis County		
U. a. horribilis	Mexican grizzly bear	extinct	EX	

=== Order Artiodactyla ===
==== Tayassuidae ====
Tayassuidae
Species	Common name	Distribution	Status	Image
Dicotyles tajacu	Collared peccary	Mostly restricted to western Texas and south of San Antonio. Introduced populations occur in north Texas	LC	

==== Cervidae ====
Cervidae
Species	Common name	Distribution	Status	Image
Cervus canadensis	Elk	Reintroduced, see below	LC	
C. c. merriami	Merriam's elk	Extinct by 1906	EX	
C. c. nelsoni	Rocky Mountain elk	Introduced to the state in 1928, currently found in the Trans-Pecos and Panhandle regions	LC	
Odocoileus hemionus	Mule deer	Found in the western-half of the state through the Panhandle and Trans-Pecos.	LC	
Odocoileus virginianus	White-tailed deer	Ubiquitous throughout Texas.	LC	

==== Antilocapridae ====
Antilocapridae
Species	Common name	Distribution	Status	Image
Antilocapra americana	Pronghorn	Native to Central and Western Texas; considered the pronghorn's easternmost range	LC	

==== Bovidae ====
Bovidae
Species	Common name	Distribution	Status	Image
Bison bison	American bison	Reintroduced, see below.	NT	
B. b. bison	Plains bison	Reintroduced at Caprock Canyons State Park and Fort Worth Nature Center as well as private herds. All controlled by fences. Historically widespread.	NT	
Ovis canadensis	Bighorn sheep	Extirpated throughout original Trans-Pecos mountain ranges. See below.	LC	
O. c. nelsoni	Desert bighorn sheep	Reintroduced populations in certain areas of the Trans-Pecos mountains are free-roaming and wild.	LC	

=== Order Eulipotyphla ===
==== Soricidae ====
Soricidae
Species	Common name	Distribution	Status	Image
Blarina carolinensis	Southern short-tailed shrew	Southern short-tailed shrews are found specifically in the eastern part of the state. They usually reside in forested areas, meadows, and openings.	LC	
Blarina hylophaga	Elliot's short-tailed shrew	The Elliot's short tailed-shrew are usually found in the south eastern part of the state. Generally, they reside where there's Live oak tree's on soft, damp soil that's easy burrowing.	LC	
Cryptotis parva	North American least shrew	found throughout most of Texas (except the Trans-Pecos, adjacent areas and from much of the Edwards Plateau.)	LC	
Notiosorex crawfordi	Crawford's gray shrew		LC	

==== Talpidae ====
Talpidae
Species	Common name	Distribution	Status	Image
Scalopus aquaticus	Eastern mole	Documented in the eastern two-thirds of the state, eastern areas of South Texas, along the Canadian River drainage in the Panhandle, and in Presidio County in the west	LC	

=== Order Sirenia ===
==== Trichechidae ====
Trichechidae
Species	Common name	Distribution	Status	Image
Trichechus manatus	West Indian manatee	Rare in Texas waters, but observed in the Laguna Madre, Cow Bayou, and near Sabine Lake, Copano Bay, San José Island, Bolivar Peninsula, and the mouth of the Rio Grande	VU	

=== Order Didelphimorphia ===
==== Didelphidae ====
Didelphidae
Species	Common name	Distribution	Status	Image
Didelphis marsupialis	Common opossum	Vagrant	LC	
Didelphis virginiana	Virginia opossum	Found throughout the state except for the arid Trans-Pecos and Llano Estacado	LC	

=== Order Lagomorpha ===
==== Leporidae ====
Leporidae
Species	Common name	Distribution	Status	Image
Lepus californicus	Black-tailed jackrabbit		LC	
Sylvilagus aquaticus	Swamp rabbit		LC	
Sylvilagus audubonni	Desert cottontail		LC	
Sylvilagus floridanus	Eastern cottontail		LC	
Sylvilagus holzneri	Robust cottontail	Davis Mountains, Guadalupe Mountains	VU	

=== Order Rodentia ===
==== Castoridae ====
Castoridae
Species	Common name	Distribution	Status	Image
Castor canadensis	North American beaver		LC	

==== Cricetidae ====
- Northern pygmy mouse (Baiomys taylori)
- Mexican vole (Microtus mexicanus)
- Woodland vole (Microtus pinetorum)
- Prairie vole (Microtus ochrogaster)
- White-throated woodrat (Neotoma albigula)
- Florida woodrat (Neotoma floridana)
- Mexican woodrat (Neotoma mexicana)
- Southern plains woodrat (Neotoma micropus)
- Golden mouse (Ochrotomys nuttalli)
- Muskrat (Ondatra zibethicus)
- Chihuahuan grasshopper mouse (Onychomys arenicola)
- Northern grasshopper mouse (Onychomys leucogaster)
- Coues' rice rat (Oryzomys couesi)
- Marsh rice rat (Oryzomys palustris)
- Texas mouse (Peromyscus attwateri)
- Brush mouse (Peromyscus boylii)
- Cactus mouse (Peromyscus eremicus)
- Cotton mouse (Peromyscus gossypinus)
- Southern deer mouse (Peromyscus labecula)
- White-footed mouse (Peromyscus leucopus)
- White-ankled mouse (Peromyscus pectoralis)
- Northern rock mouse (Peromyscus nasutus)
- Western deer mouse (Peromyscus sonoriensis)
- Pinyon mouse (Peromyscus truei)
- Eastern harvest mouse (Reithrodontomys humulis)
- Fulvous harvest mouse (Reithrodontomys fulvescens)
- Western harvest mouse (Reithrodontomys megalotis)
- Plains harvest mouse (Reithrodontomys montanus)
- Tawny-bellied cotton rat (Sigmodon fulviventer)
- Hispid cotton rat (Sigmodon hispidus)
- Yellow-nosed cotton rat (Sigmodon ochrognathus)

==== Erethizontidae ====
Erethizontidae
Species	Common name	Distribution	Status	Image
Erethizon dorsatum	North American porcupine	Found in the western half of the state.	LC	

==== Geomyidae ====
Geomyidae
Species	Common name	Distribution	Status	Image
Cratogeomys castanops	Yellow-faced pocket gopher	Commonly found in the western-half of the state in the high plains and trans-pecos.	LC	
Geomys arenarius	Desert pocket gopher	Common in El Paso County.	NT	
Geomys attwateri	Attwater's pocket gopher	Endemic to Texas. East from the Brazos River to the San Antonio River, and along the coast in-between.	LC	
Geomys breviceps	Baird's pocket gopher	Found in the eastern half of the state.	LC	
Geomys bursarius	Plains pocket gopher	Found in the northwestern and north-central Texas panhandle.	LC	
Geomys jugossicularis	Hall's pocket gopher	Found in the northwesternmost-counties of Dallam and Hartley.		
Geomys knoxjonesi	Knox Jones's pocket gopher	Found in the southwestern plains of Texas.	LC	
Geomys personatus	Texas pocket gopher	Found in the far south counties of the state, including the Texas barrier islands.	LC	
Geomys streckeri	Strecker's pocket gopher	Restricted to Zavala and Dimmit Counties.		
Geomys texensis	Llano pocket gopher	Found in two isolated areas in the Hill Country depending on subspecies. Endemic to Texas.	LC	
Thomomys bottae	Botta's pocket gopher	Found in the Trans-Pecos eastward into the Edwards Plateau.	LC	

==== Heteromyidae ====
- Hispid pocket mouse (Chaetodipus hispidus)
- Rock pocket mouse (Chaetodipus intermedius)
- Nelson's pocket mouse (Chaetodipus nelsoni)
- Desert pocket mouse (Chaetodipus penicillatus)
- Gulf Coast kangaroo rat (Dipodomys compactus)
- Texas kangaroo rat (Dipodomys elator)
- Merriam's kangaroo rat (Dipodomys merriami)
- Ord's kangaroo rat (Dipodomys ordii)
- Banner-tailed kangaroo rat (Dipodomys spectabilis)
- Mexican spiny pocket mouse (Liomys irroratus)
- Plains pocket mouse (Perognathus flavescens)
- Silky pocket mouse (Perognathus flavus)
- Merriam's pocket mouse (Perognathus merriami)

==== Sciuridae ====
- Texas antelope squirrel (Ammospermophilus interpres)
- Black-tailed prairie dog (Cynomys ludovicianus)
- Southern flying squirrel (Glaucomys volans)
- Gray-footed chipmunk (Neotamias canipes)
- Eastern gray squirrel (Sciurus carolinensis)
- Fox squirrel (Sciurus niger)
- Mexican ground squirrel (Spermophilus mexicanus)
- Spotted ground squirrel (Spermophilus spilosoma)
- Thirteen-lined ground squirrel (Spermophilus tridecemlineatus)
- Rock squirrel (Spermophilus variegatus)

=== Order Cetacea ===
==== Balaenidae ====
Balaenidae
Species	Common name	Distribution	Status	Image
Eubalaena glacialis	North Atlantic right whale			

==== Balaenopteridae ====
Balaenopteridae
Species	Common name	Distribution	Status	Image
Balaenoptera acutorostrata	Minke whale	Seen stranded occasionally, rare sightings. Last seen in Texas in the 1980s.		
Balaenoptera brydei Balaenoptera edeni	Bryde's whale	Seen yearly in every season but the fall in shallow waters. Taxonomy up to debate		
Balaenoptera musculus	Blue whale			
Balaenoptera physalus	Fin whale			
Megaptera novaeangliae	Humpback whale			

==== Kogiidae ====
Kogiidae is a family of whales.

Kogiidae
Species	Common name	Distribution	Status	Image
Kogia breviceps	Pygmy sperm whale			
Kogia simus	Dwarf sperm whale			

==== Physeteridae ====
Physeteridae is a monotypic family of whales only containing the extant Physeter macrocephalus.

Physeteridae
Species	Common name	Distribution	Status	Image
Physeter macrocephalus	Sperm whale			A large black whale with a blunt head and proportionally-small flippers

==== Ziphiidae ====
Ziphiidae
Species	Common name	Distribution	Status	Image
Mesoplodon densirostris	Blainville's beaked whale			
Mesoplodon europaeus	Gervais' beaked whale			
Ziphius cavirostris	Cuvier's beaked whale			

==== Delphinidae ====
Delphinidae
Species	Common name	Distribution	Status	Image
Delphinus delphis	Short-beaked common dolphin			
Feresa attenuata	Pygmy killer whale			
Globicephala macrorhynchus	Short-finned pilot whale			
Grampus griseus	Risso's dolphin			
Orcinus orca	Killer whale	Uncommon in Texas waters, rare and poorly documented strandings, occasionally seen off South Padre Island		
Pseudorca crassidens	False killer whale			
Peponocephala electra	Melon-headed whale			
Stenella frontalis	Atlantic spotted dolphin			
Stenella attenuata	Pantropical spotted dolphin			
Stenella coeruleoalba	Striped dolphin			
Stenella clymene	Clymene dolphin			
Stenella longirostris	Spinner dolphin			
Steno brenadensis	Rough-toothed dolphin			
Tursiops truncatus	Common bottlenose dolphin			

== Introduced/invasive mammals ==
=== Order Primates ===
Primates
Species	Common name	Distribution	Status	Image
Macaca fuscata	Japanese macaque	Introduced to a sanctuary in Frio County	LC	

=== Order Carnivora ===
==== Canidae (canids) ====
Canidae
Species	Common name	Distribution	Status	Image
Vulpes vulpes	Red fox	While native to North America, red foxes were introduced to Texas and have expanded over most of the state, except the far western and southern regions	LC	

=== Order Artiodactyla ===
==== Suidae (pigs) ====
Suidae
Species	Common name	Distribution	Status	Image
Sus scrofa	Wild boar	Ubiquitous throughout Texas	LC	
Phacochoerus africanus	Common warthog	Found in Dimmit, La Salle, McMullen, and Live Oak counties.	LC	

==== Cervidae (deer) ====
Cervidae
Species	Common name	Distribution	Status	Image
Axis axis	Chital		LC	
Axis porcinus	Indian hog deer		EN	
Cervus elaphus	Red deer		LC	
Cervus nippon	Sika deer		LC	
Dama dama	European fallow deer		LC	
Rusa unicolor	Sambar deer		VU	

==== Bovidae (antelopes and sheep) ====
Bovidae
Species	Common name	Distribution	Status	Image
Ammotragus lervia	Barbary sheep		VU	
Antilope cervicapra	Blackbuck		LC	
Boselaphus tragocamelus	Nilgai		LC	

=== Order Rodentia ===
==== Muridae (Old World mice and rats) ====
Muridae
Species	Common name	Distribution	Status	Image
Mus musculus	House mouse	Ubiquitous throughout Texas	LC	
Rattus norvegicus	Brown rat	Widespread throughout Texas, however not as common in the southern half of Texas as Rattus rattus	LC	
Rattus rattus	Black rat	Ubiquitous throughout Texas	LC	

==== Myocastoridae (nutria) ====
Myocastoridae
Species	Common name	Distribution	Status	Image
Myocastor coypus	Nutria	Invasive species in eastern two-thirds of Texas, currently expanding westward	LC	

== See also ==
- Geography of Texas
- List of amphibians of Texas
- List of reptiles of Texas
- List of birds of Texas

== Notes and references ==
=== Notes ===
a: Conservation status at a world level of the species according to the IUCN Red List: Conservation status - IUCN Red List of Threatened Species:

EX - Extinct
EW - Extinct in the wild
CR - Critically endangered
EN - Endangered
VU - Vulnerable
NT - Near threatened
LC - Least concern
DD - Data deficient
NE - Not evaluated
