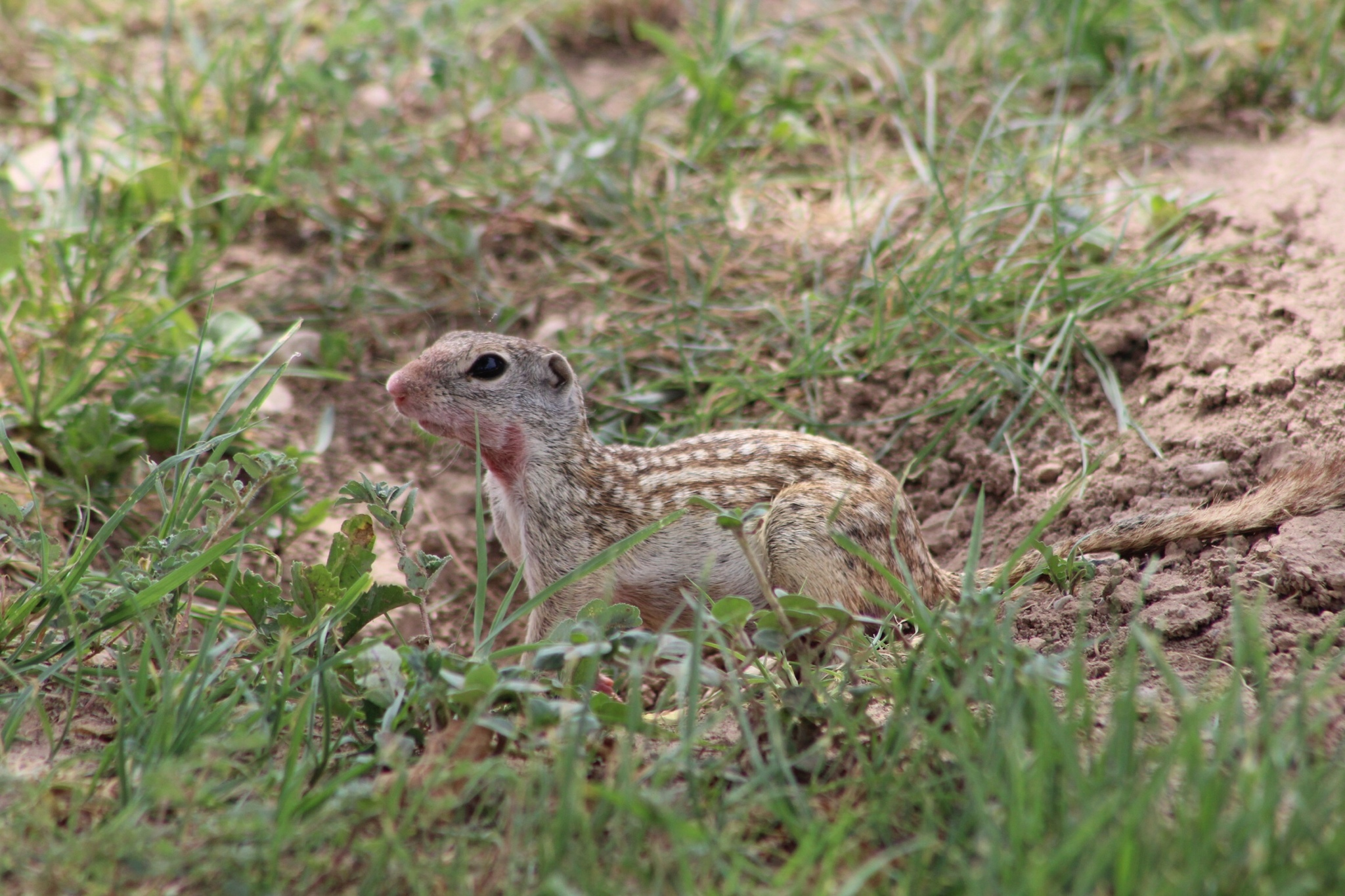

Scientific classification
- Kingdom: Animalia
- Phylum: Chordata
- Class: Mammalia
- Order: Rodentia
- Family: Sciuridae
- Genus: Ictidomys
- Species: I. parvidens

Binomial name
- Ictidomys parvidens (Mearns, 1896)

Synonyms
- Spermophilus mexicanus parvidens

= Rio Grande ground squirrel =

Species of rodent

The Rio Grande ground squirrel (Ictidomys parvidens) is a species of squirrel in the family Sciuridae. It is found in the southwestern United States (Texas and New Mexico) and in northeastern Mexico.

== Description ==
The Rio Grande ground squirrel is predominantly brown with nine broken rows of squarish white spots on its back. Its spotting is less distinct than the spotting on the thirteen-lined ground squirrel. It varies in body length from 29.9 centimetres (11.8 in) to 35.2 centimetres (13.9 in)

== Distribution and Habitat ==
The Rio Grande ground squirrel is found in grasslands and scrub habitat from southwestern New Mexico to northern Zacatecas and east to the gulf coast. In western Texas, it is often associated with mesquite and cholla.

While much of its original habitat has been destroyed by humans, it has adapted well to human civilization and can now be found on golf courses and other grassy areas such as the sides of highways. Each squirrel normally has more than one burrow and each of them has as many as five escape tunnels. The tunnels are not marked by a mound of dirt on top. Most burrows have a sleeping chamber for the offspring which is lined with grasses.

== Diet ==
The Rio Grande ground squirrel is omnivorous. Its diet includes seeds, nuts, grains, roots, bulbs, plant stems, leaves, mice, insects, and eggs. It often stores seeds, grains, and nuts in its cheek pouches and takes them back to its den to eat later. In the summer it eats insects. It has also been documented eating roadkill.

== Reproduction and hibernation ==
The mating season of the Mexican ground squirrel lasts from April to mid July, with a peak in May. Females can mate after their first season of hibernation. It is common for most Mexican ground squirrels to hibernate, but there have been cases where they have not. The species is normally solitary, but come together in groups during the mating season. It has been found that female hormone levels change during this period to allow the coming together of groups without aggression. During the mating season, The female will prepare a nesting chamber in her burrow and line it with mesquite and grass. The average litter size is five, but can range from one to ten. The young are born toothless, without fur, and will stay with their mother for three months before leaving to live on their own.

== Taxonomy and systematics ==
The Rio Grande ground squirrel was historically considered a subspecies of the Mexican ground squirrel and, along with the other species of the genus Ictidomys, was classified in the much larger genus Spermophilus. DNA sequencing of the cytochrome b gene showed that this group was paraphyletic to the prairie dogs and marmots, leading to the separation of Ictidomys. The Rio Grande ground squirrel was separated from the Mexican ground squirrel due to its smaller body size and disjunct range.

The Rio Grande hybridizes with the thirteen-lined ground squirrel in western Texas and southeastern New Mexico.
