= Oxyomoides dyspistus =

Scientific classification
- Kingdom: Animalia
- Phylum: Arthropoda
- Clade: Pancrustacea
- Class: Insecta
- Order: Coleoptera
- Suborder: Polyphaga
- Infraorder: Scarabaeiformia
- Family: Scarabaeidae
- Genus: Oxyomoides
- Species: O. dyspistus

Binomial name
- Oxyomoides dyspistus (Skelley & Woodruff, 1991)

Synonyms
- Aphodius dyspistus Skelley & Woodruff, 1991

Species of beetle

Oxyomoides dyspistus is a species of beetle of the family Scarabaeidae. It is found in the United States (Alabama, Georgia, Florida).

== Description ==
Adults reach a length of about 3–3.5 mm (0.12–0.14 in). They have a moderately elongate, convex, weakly shiny, pubescent, dark brown body, with the margin of the clypeus, legs and antennal club reddish brown.

== Life history ==
Specimens have been collected in the burrows of Geomys pinetis.
