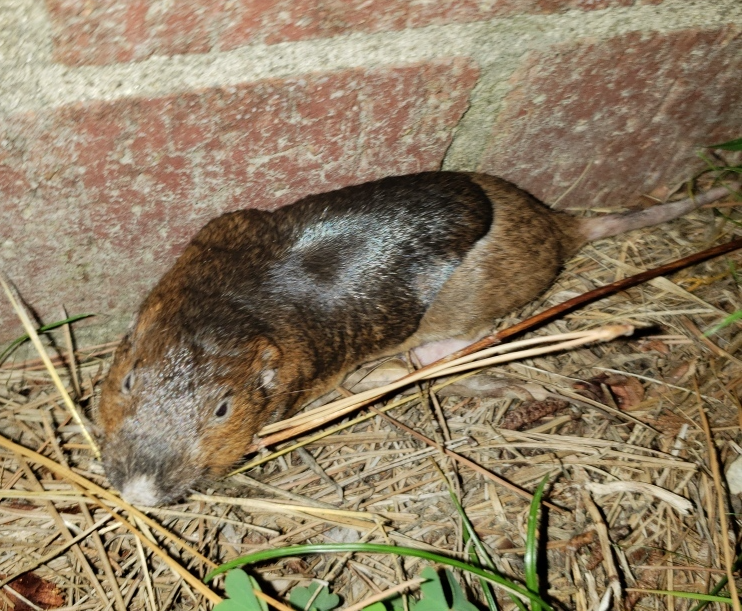

Conservation status
- Least Concern (IUCN 3.1)

Scientific classification
- Kingdom: Animalia
- Phylum: Chordata
- Class: Mammalia
- Order: Rodentia
- Family: Geomyidae
- Genus: Geomys
- Species: G. breviceps

Binomial name
- Geomys breviceps Baird, 1855

= Baird's pocket gopher =

Species of rodent

Baird's pocket gopher or the Louisiana pocket gopher (Geomys breviceps) is a species of pocket gopher that is native to the southern United States. In total, there are three almost identical species of eastern pocket gopher; Geomys attwateri, G. bursarius, and G. breviceps. G. breviceps is larger in size, G. attwateri is medium-sized and G. bursarius is a bit smaller. Other than by size variation they are not identifiable by external features. Baird's pocket gophers are small rodents with most of their weight on the top half of their bodies.

Baird's pocket gopher is native to eastern Texas, western Louisiana, eastern Oklahoma and southwestern Arkansas. It is a burrowing creature, meaning it digs tunnels and generally lives underground, except during the rainy seasons. It has sharp, long, curved front claws designed specifically for digging. Generally, it is safe from predators since it lives underground, though other burrowing rodents such as badgers and long-tailed weasels may pose a threat. Baird's pocket gopher has bacteria in its digestive system, allowing it to digest various grasses and it is able to re-ingest fecal pellets. It is polygamous and has a high reproductive rate, which is one of the main reasons for its survival. On average, Baird's pocket gopher has two to three babies per litter. It lives about 1 to 2 years in the wild.

== Description ==
The pocket gophers are considered to be medium to small in size in the order Rodentia. Baird's pocket gopher has a cylinder shaped body with most of its weight carried near its head. The zygomatic arch is shorter than the width of the mouth, meaning the dorsal of the animal exceeds the jugal bone. The neck is a little thinner but the heaviest part of the body is carried on the back of the head. The eyes are very small and beadlike and the ears are identified only by a meager flap of skin that follows the top of the temple. The cheek pouches are fur-lined and used for transporting food. The body gradually tapers from the head to the tail, widening a little at the thighs.

Short hair covers the body and ranges in color from pale brown to black and is usually paler towards the belly area. The tail is short, thick, and bare with very little hair found at the base and averaging 65 mm (2.6 in) in length. The front feet are used for digging and the feet appear as long curved claws; the rear feet are smaller with an average length of 31 mm (1.2 in). The animals look identical to G. attwateri and G. bursarius. Only genetic testing and range location can distinguish them. The males have an average weight of 180–200 g (6.3–7.1 oz) and a cranium length of 19 mm (0.75 in), while the average weight for females is 120–160 g (4.2–5.6 oz) with a cranium length of 19 mm (0.75 in).

== Distribution and habitat ==
Baird's pocket gopher is commonly located on the Gulf Coastal Plains of eastern Texas in three different soil types. It is found in fine sandy Lufkin as well as in Ochlocknee soil types where the topsoil has a depth of less than 10 centimetres (3.9 in). The third soil type, Wilson sandy loam, becomes hard and compact when it dries, therefore G. breviceps is not inclined to habituate itself in any soil made of dense clay. The species is less likely to be in soil that has a high moisture content.

Baird's pocket gopher lives a solitary life underground with the ability to create burrows, which are its common form of living quarters. The only time a gopher may retreat from its burrow is during wet months, to avoid being flooded out. On average each burrow is 6 cm (2.4 in) in diameter and is found at depths of 10–68 cm (3.9–26.8 in) underground, making it possible for only one adult gopher to occupy a single burrow system. Burrow systems are very complex and range from 55–180 cm (22–71 in) in length. These burrows contain feeding galleries, a nesting chamber, a "bathroom", and food storage chambers. During the winter months, G. breviceps creates mounds above ground that are found to be globular in shape. These mounds can measure up to 1.8 m (71 in) in diameter

== Diet ==
Baird's pocket gopher eats grass, tubers, certain roots, and many other types of plant life. It burrows underground and while making its nests obtains food from the roots of different plants in its tunnels. The gophers store the food they gather in small pockets that look like black slits called "cheek pouches" on the side of their head, which is where the name "pocket gopher" was thought to arise. If there is no food where they burrow, they at least tend to try to find food close to where they are nesting; it is rarely seen above ground.

To facilitate the digestion of grasses and other plants, Baird's pocket gophers utilize bacteria in their digestive system, which contains cellulase. Like other mammals or rodents, Baird's pocket gophers re-ingest fecal pellets, which benefits them during the winter and the rainier seasons of the year. The re-ingestion of fecal pellets increases the efficiency of food utilization, which is useful when plants are scarce in these seasons.
