= Goff's pocket gopher =

Conservation status
- Extinct (1955)

Scientific classification
- Domain: Eukaryota
- Kingdom: Animalia
- Phylum: Chordata
- Class: Mammalia
- Order: Rodentia
- Family: Geomyidae
- Genus: Geomys
- Species: G. pinetis
- Subspecies: †G. p. goffi

Trinomial name
- †Geomys pinetis goffi Sherman, 1944

Extinct subspecies of rodent

Goff's southeastern pocket gopher (Geomys pinetis goffi) was a pocket gopher endemic to Brevard County, Florida, United States. The last sightings recorded were in 1955. They burrowed and lived mostly underground eating mainly underground vegetation. Their habitat was temperate desert and sandy coastline. Due to human population growth and development of its habitat, this gopher is now extinct.
