= Oxyomoides baileyi =

Scientific classification
- Kingdom: Animalia
- Phylum: Arthropoda
- Clade: Pancrustacea
- Class: Insecta
- Order: Coleoptera
- Suborder: Polyphaga
- Infraorder: Scarabaeiformia
- Family: Scarabaeidae
- Genus: Oxyomoides
- Species: O. baileyi

Binomial name
- Oxyomoides baileyi (Skelley & Gordon, 2001)

Synonyms
- Aphodius baileyi Skelley & Gordon, 2001

Species of beetle

Oxyomoides baileyi is a species of beetle of the family Scarabaeidae. It is found in the United States (Alabama, Florida, Georgia).

== Description ==
Adults reach a length of about 3–4 mm (0.12–0.16 in). They have an elongate, convex, shiny, shortly pubescent, dark brown body. The margin of the clypeus, anterior angles of the pronotum, legs and antennal club are all reddish brown.

== Life history ==
Specimens have been collected in the burrows of Geomys pinetis.
