= Oxyomoides sepultus =

Scientific classification
- Kingdom: Animalia
- Phylum: Arthropoda
- Clade: Pancrustacea
- Class: Insecta
- Order: Coleoptera
- Suborder: Polyphaga
- Infraorder: Scarabaeiformia
- Family: Scarabaeidae
- Genus: Oxyomoides
- Species: O. sepultus

Binomial name
- Oxyomoides sepultus (Cartwright, 1944)

Synonyms
- Aphodius sepultus Cartwright, 1944

Species of beetle

Oxyomoides sepultus is a species of beetle of the family Scarabaeidae. It is found in the United States (Arkansas, Kansas, Louisiana, Texas).

== Description ==
Adults reach a length of about 3–3.5 mm (0.12–0.14 in). They have a moderately elongate, convex, sub-shiny, pubescent, brown body, with the margin of the clypeus and sides of the pronotum paler. The legs are reddish brown and the antennal club is brownish.

== Life history ==
Specimens have been collected in the burrows of Geomys species.
