= Oxyomoides =

Scientific classification
- Kingdom: Animalia
- Phylum: Arthropoda
- Clade: Pancrustacea
- Class: Insecta
- Order: Coleoptera
- Suborder: Polyphaga
- Infraorder: Scarabaeiformia
- Family: Scarabaeidae
- Subfamily: Aphodiinae
- Tribe: Aphodiini
- Genus: Oxyomoides; Dellacasa, Dellacasa & Gordon, 2016

Genus of beetles

Oxyomoides is a genus of beetles of the family Scarabaeidae.

== Species ==
- Oxyomoides baileyi (Skelley & Gordon, 2001)
- Oxyomoides dyspistus (Skelley & Woodruff, 1991)
- Oxyomoides sepultus (Cartwright, 1944)
