= Geomys tyrioni =

Geomys tyrioni Temporal range: Early Pleistocene

Scientific classification
- Kingdom: Animalia
- Phylum: Chordata
- Class: Mammalia
- Infraclass: Placentalia
- Order: Rodentia
- Family: Geomyidae
- Genus: Geomys
- Species: †G. tyrioni

Binomial name
- †Geomys tyrioni Martin, 2016

Extinct species of mammal

Geomys tyrioni is an extinct species of Geomys that lived in Kansas during the Early Pleistocene.
