= Henry Philemon Attwater =

British-Canadian-American naturalist and conservationist

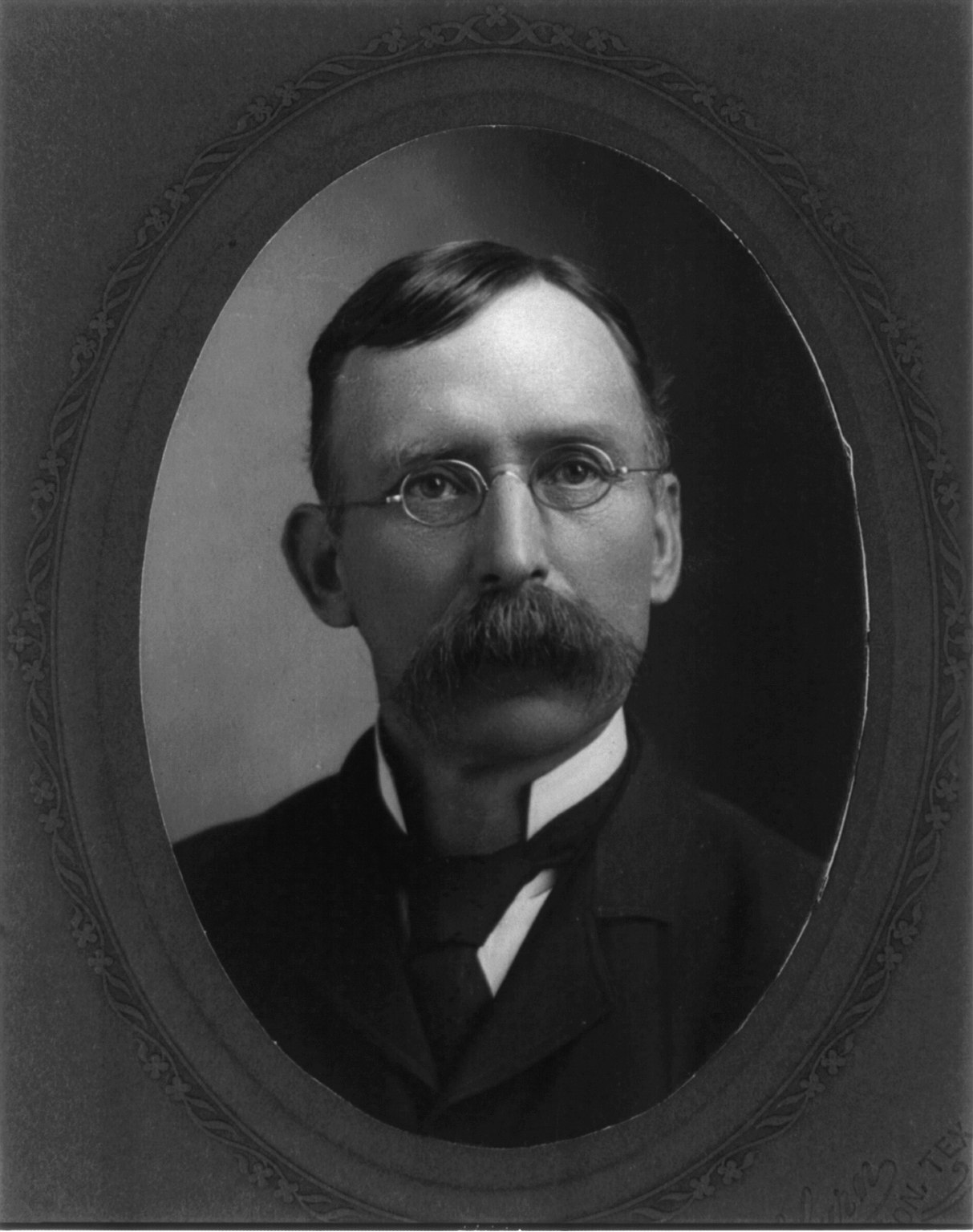
Henry Attwater, ca. 1900

Henry Philemon Attwater (28 April 1854, in Brighton – 25 September 1931, in Houston) was a British-Canadian-American naturalist and conservationist.

Educated at St Nicholas Episcopal College in Shoreham, West Sussex, Attwater emigrated in 1873 from England to Ontario, Canada, where he engaged in farming and beekeeping. In 1883, a friend, John A. Morden, and he prepared and exhibited natural history specimens. In 1884, the two Canadians collected specimens in Bexar County, Texas. During the latter part of 1884 and early 1885, Attwater and Gustave Toudouze, a naturalist and taxidermist from Losoya, were hired by the state of Texas to prepare and exhibit the Texas Pavilion's natural history specimens at the New Orleans World's Fair.

On New Year's Eve in 1885 in Chatham, Ontario, Attwater married a widow with two children. In 1886 Attwater with his acquired family moved to London, Ontario, where he ran a small museum, which proved to be financially unsuccessful and closed in the summer of 1887. In 1889, the family emigrated from Canada to the US, where they lived in Sherman, Texas, and then in San Antonio. During the 1890s, Attwater collected and lectured throughout Texas and wrote on natural history and agricultural subjects. In 1900, he moved from San Antonio to Houston to become the Southern Pacific Railroad's agricultural and industrial agent. He continued in this position until his retirement in 1913. In the 1920s, he sold his natural history collection to the Witte Museum.

His three ornithological papers deal with the nesting habits of 50 species of birds in Bexar County, Texas, the occurrence of 242 species of birds in the vicinity of San Antonio, and the deaths of thousands of warblers during a blue norther in March 1892. Attwater also contributed specimens to the Smithsonian Institution, collected birds for George B. Sennett, and provided notes for W. W. Cooke's Bird Migration in the Mississippi Valley (1888) and the mammal section of Vernon Bailey's Biological Survey of Texas (1905).

Attwater was the director of the National Audubon Society from 1900 to 1910. He worked for the passage of the 1903 Model Game Law and hunting license laws. He also promoted legislation to protect the mourning dove Zenaida macroura.

The rodents Peromyscus attwateri (Texas mouse or Attwater's white-footed mouse) and Geomys attwateri (Attwater's pocket gopher) are named in his honor.

== Subspecies named in honor of Attwater ==
- Lepus aquaticus attwateri (Attwater's swamp rabbit)
- Neotoma floridana attwateri (Attwater's wood rat)
- Tympanuchus cupido attwateri (Attwater's prairie chicken)

== Selected works ==
- Boll Weevils and Birds. 1903.
- Use and Value of Wild Birds to Texas Farmers and Stockmen and Fruit and Truck Growers. 1914.
- The Disappearance of Wild Life. 1917.
