= List of amphibians of Texas =

Topographic map of Texas

Seventy-one amphibian species are found in the American state of Texas, including forty-four species of frog and twenty-eight species of salamander. Four species are categorized as endangered by the International Union for Conservation of Nature: the Barton Springs salamander, the Texas blind salamander, the black-spotted newt, and the Houston toad. Furthermore, Texas law protects several native amphibians, designating eleven species as threatened within the state and four others as endangered.

The diverse geography of Texas, the second-largest state, hosts a variety of habitats for amphibians, including swamps and the Piney Woods in the east, rocky hills and limestone karst in the central Hill Country of the Edwards Plateau, desert in the south and west, mountains in the far west (the Trans-Pecos), and grassland prairie in the north, also known as the Panhandle. This vast contrast in biomes makes Texas home to a wide variety of herpetofauna. The state's many rivers, including the Rio Grande, the Colorado River, and the Trinity River, also provide diverse aquatic habitats. Its central position in the United States means that species found primarily in either the western or eastern reaches of the country often have their ranges meeting in the state. Additionally, its proximity to Mexico is such that many species found there and into Central America also range as far north as Texas. Moreover, the karst topography of central Texas has created spring and cave ecosystems inhabited by several endemic species, such as the cave-dwelling Texas blind salamander.

== List of species ==
Protected status under Texas law
| † | Threatened |
| ‡ | Endangered |

=== Order Anura ===
==== Family Bufonidae ====
Bufonidae is a family of toads, often called the "true toads". Although a widely varied family, Bufonidae includes the stereotypical toad: dry warty skin and shortened forelimbs and hindlimbs. Bufonids also carry potent skin toxins, sometimes concentrated in the parotoid gland.

Bufonidae
| Species | Common name | Distribution | Status | Image |
|---|---|---|---|---|
| Anaxyrus americanus | American toad | Occurs in northeast Texas | LC | A black and white patterned toad sits on a log |
| Anaxyrus cognatus | Great Plains toad | Found in playa wetlands in the Great Plains area of the state | LC | |
| Anaxyrus debilis | Green toad | Found in eastern Texas | LC | A green toad with black speckles |
| Anaxyrus houstonensis | Houston toad | Found in the southeast counties of Austin, Bastrop, Burleson, Colorado, Lee, Leon, Lavaca, Milam, and Robertson | EN ‡ | A brown frog with warty skin |
| Anaxyrus punctatus | Red-spotted toad | Found in central and western Texas | LC | A light green frog with brown and black spots on its back |
| Anaxyrus speciosus | Texas toad | Common throughout western two-thirds of Texas, population declining in the Rio Grande Valley | LC | A brown frog with warty skin |
| Anaxyrus woodhousii | Woodhouse's toad | Found in central, west and north Texas | LC | A brown frog with warty skin |
| Incilius nebulifer | Coastal plains toad | Found along coastal plains, formerly considered the same species as Incilius valliceps | LC | A light brown frog with darker brown patterns on its back |
| Rhinella marina | Cane toad | Native to extreme southern Texas, invasive species in other parts of the United States | LC | Brown toad with rough skin |

==== Family Hylidae ====
Hylidae is a family of frogs which are commonly found in the New World. They may be better known as tree frogs.

Hylidae
| Species | Common name | Distribution | Status | Image |
|---|---|---|---|---|
| Acris blanchardi | Blanchard's cricket frog | Found throughout Texas, except far West Texas and the Panhandle | NE | |
| Dryophytes arenicolor | Canyon tree frog | Isolated populations in arid environments and streambanks in Texas | LC | A dull brown frog sits on a rock surface |
| Dryophytes chrysoscelis | Cope's gray tree frog | Documented in east-central Texas | LC | A light green frog |
| Dryophytes cinereus | Green tree frog | Occurs throughout eastern Texas and as far south as the Rio Grande Valley | LC | A bright green frog |
| Hyla squirella | Squirrel tree frog | Found in eastern Texas | LC | A bright green frog |
| Dryophytes versicolor | Gray tree frog | Found in the eastern-central portion of the state, excluding the most eastern fifth | LC | A green frog clings to a leaf in a forest |
| Pseudacris clarkii | Spotted chorus frog | Found in central Texas | LC | |
| Pseudacris crucifer | Spring peeper | Found in eastern Texas | LC | An orange frog clings to the side of a tree |
| Pseudacris fouquettei | Cajun chorus frog | Found throughout eastern Texas | LC | A brown frog |
| Pseudacris streckeri | Strecker's chorus frog | Found throughout eastern Texas | LC | A green frog with a bulging throat sits in shallow water |
| Smilisca baudinii | Mexican tree frog | Southern extreme of Texas | LC † | A green frog with a leaf-like skin pattern |

==== Family Leptodactylidae ====
Leptodactylidae is a family of frogs found only in the New World. Texas encompasses part of their northern-most distribution. Medium to large frogs, they have robust hindlimbs that make them strong jumpers.

Leptodactylidae
| Species | Common name | Distribution | Status | Image |
|---|---|---|---|---|
| Craugastor augusti | Eastern barking frog | Found in western and central Texas and along the Balcones Fault; isolated populations exist in the Trans-Pecos region | LC | A brown frog with black spots and large eyes |
| Eleutherodactylus cystignathoides | Rio Grande chirping frog | Native to extreme southern Texas along the lower Rio Grande Valley in Cameron and Hildago counties | LC | Eleutherodactylus cystignathoides, Liberty Co., TX, USA |
| Eleutherodactylus guttilatus | Spotted chirping frog | Found in the Big Bend region | LC | A brownish-red frog |
| Eleutherodactylus marnockii | Cliff chirping frog | Common in rocky areas of central Texas | LC | A black frog with green spots |
| Eleutherodactylus planirostris | Greenhouse frog | Introduced species found on Galveston Island | LC | A greenish-brown and black patterned frog |
| Leptodactylus fragilis | Mexican white-lipped frog | Documented in the extreme southern portion of the lower Rio Grande Valley | LC † | A light brown patterned frog |

==== Family Microhylidae ====
Microhylidae is a family of frogs. They can often be identified by their tear-dropped shape, hence the common name "narrow-mouthed frogs".

Microhylidae
| Species | Common name | Distribution | Status | Image |
|---|---|---|---|---|
| Gastrophryne carolinensis | Eastern narrowmouth frog | As far west as central Texas | LC | A frog with a head that ends in a point |
| Gastrophryne olivacea | Great Plains narrowmouth frog | Found throughout Texas except for northern Panhandle and western extremes | LC | A greyish-brown frog rests on a leaf |
| Hypopachus variolosus | Mexican narrow-mouthed frog | Found in 15 counties in southern Texas | LC † | A broad, flat frog with a head that ends in a point |

==== Family Ranidae ====
Ranidae, true frogs, are the largest family of frogs. Members of this family, called Ranids, typically have robust hindlimbs, toe webbing, and an aquatic tadpole stage.

Ranidae
| Species | Common name | Distribution | Status | Image |
|---|---|---|---|---|
| Lithobates areolatus | Crawfish frog | Once found throughout eastern Texas, now limited to two populations near coast | NT † | A green frog with brown spots |
| Lithobates berlandieri | Rio Grande leopard frog | Occur in central and western areas of the state | LC | A brown patterned frog |
| Lithobates blairi | Plains leopard frog | Distribution includes northern Texas | LC | A brown patterned frog with a light underside |
| Lithobates catesbeianus | Bullfrog | Occurs throughout most of Texas | LC | A bulky brown frog with green above its mouth and a yellow underside |
| Lithobates clamitans | Green frog | Throughout eastern Texas | LC | A brown frog with green around its mouth |
| Lithobates grylio | Pig frog | Galveston Bay and Gulf Coastal Plain to the east | LC | A brown frog |
| Lithobates palustris | Pickerel frog | Found throughout eastern Texas | LC | A brown patterned frog |
| Lithobates sphenocephala | Southern leopard frog | Common in the eastern third of Texas | LC | A brown frog with black spots and two white stripes along its side |

==== Family Rhinophrynidae ====
Rhinophrynidae are a family of frogs containing only one extant genus, the monotypic Rhinophrynus. Rhinophrynus is a burrowing ant and termite eater, hence the common name "burrowing frog".

Rhinophrynidae
| Species | Common name | Distribution | Status | Image |
|---|---|---|---|---|
| Rhinophrynus dorsalis | Mexican burrowing toad | Documented in the counties of Starr and Zapata in extreme southwestern Texas | LC † | A black frog spottled with red-orange markings sits on gravel |

==== Family Scaphiopodidae ====
Scaphiopodidae are a family of frogs. Commonly called spadefoot frogs, they are often inconspicuously coloured. Members of this family are predominantly fossorial, living underground until rain arrives. To aid in digging, they have keratinized protrusions on their feet.

Scaphiopodidae
| Species | Common name | Distribution | Status | Image |
|---|---|---|---|---|
| Scaphiopus couchii | Couch's spadefoot toad | Central Texas | LC | A brown patterned frog sits on a sandy surface |
| Scaphiopus hurterii | Hurter's spadefoot toad | Inhabits freshwater areas of Texan forest, shrubland, grassland, and wetlands | LC | A green frog walking |
| Spea bombifrons | Plains spadefoot toad | Found in the arid plains of northwest Texas; isolated populations also exist in south Texas | LC | A dark green frog with orange spots rests at the edge of a pond |
| Spea multiplicata | New Mexico spadefoot toad | Found in central Texas | LC | A plump toad with light-colored pigmentation |

=== Order Urodela ===
==== Family Amphiumidae ====
Amphiumidae are a family of salamanders. Members of the family are known as amphiumas. These large salamanders are often mistaken for eels, hence the colloquial name "conger eels". Completely aquatic, these long salamanders can survive droughts by forming a mucous cocoon underground. They can live without food for up to three years and may live for almost 30 years.

Amphiumidae
| Species | Common name | Distribution | Status | Image |
|---|---|---|---|---|
| Amphiuma tridactylum | Three-toed amphiuma | Native to the eastern area of the state | LC | A long grey amphiuma lies on rocks |

==== Family Salamandridae ====
Salamandridae are a family of salamanders. Most members, called salamandrids, produce a potent toxin in their skin. Salamandrids typically have patterns of bright and contrasting colors, usually to warn potential predators of their toxicity. They have four well-developed limbs.

Salamandridae
| Species | Common name | Distribution | Status | Image |
|---|---|---|---|---|
| Notophthalmus meridionalis | Black-spotted newt | Found in southern Texas | EN † | A spotted salamanders walks across gravel |
| Notophthalmus viridescens | Eastern newt | Native to eastern Texas | LC | A black spottled salamander with a beige underside walks on a white surface |

==== Family Ambystomatidae ====
Ambystomatidae is a family of mostly terrestrial salamanders. Commonly called "mole salamanders", most members of this family live in rodent burrows, only emerging on rainy nights to mate and feed. These relatively large salamanders also typically have mass migrations to mating ponds.

Ambystomatidae
| Species | Common name | Distribution | Status | Image |
|---|---|---|---|---|
| Ambystoma maculatum | Spotted salamander | Found near stagnant water in hardwood and mixed forests | LC | A black salamander with yellow spots along its back |
| Ambystoma mavortium | Barred tiger salamander | Distributed throughout Texas except eastern quarter | LC | A black salamander with green pattern on its back and yellowish white underside |
| Ambystoma opacum | Marbled salamander | Found throughout East Texas, from Red River south to the Gulf of Mexico | LC | A black salamander with white bars on its back |
| Ambystoma talpoideum | Mole salamander | Found in the Gulf Coastal Plain of east Texas | LC | A completely black salamander |
| Ambystoma texanum | Smallmouth salamander | Eastern Texas | LC | A brown salamander resting on leaves |
| Ambystoma tigrinum | Eastern tiger salamander | Distributed throughout Texas except eastern quarter | LC | A pair of black salamanders sporting a yellow pattern and broad head |

==== Family Plethodontidae ====
Plethodontidae are a family of salamanders found mostly in the Western Hemisphere; however, some species are found in Southern Europe and South Korea. They are the largest group of salamanders. Several species of salamanders are endemic to specific cave systems in Texas. Due to their small habitat and specified role, many are threatened or endangered. In 2019, researchers associated with the University of Texas Austin and Texas Parks and Wildlife announced the discovery of an additional three species of spring and cave dwelling salamanders in the Eurycea genus that are yet to be named.

Plethodontidae
| Species | Common name | Distribution | Status | Image |
|---|---|---|---|---|
| Desmognathus auriculatus | Southern dusky salamander | As far east as the Trinity River Basin | LC | A brown salamander |
| Eurycea latitans | Cascade Caverns salamander | Endemic to the Cascade Caverns of central Texas and other cave systems in close proximity | VU † | |
| Eurycea nana | San Marcos salamander | Found only in the San Marcos River in Hays County | VU † | A slim salamander with translucent skin rests underwater |
| Eurycea naufragia | Georgetown salamander | Endemic to area northeast of the Colorado River in the Edwards Plateau region of central Texas | EN † | Three slim salamanders with translucent skin and external red gills |
| Eurycea neotenes | Texas salamander | Spring and cave systems in the Edwards Plateau region of central Texas | VU † | |
| Eurycea quadridigitata | Dwarf salamander | Found in eastern Texas | LC | A slender dark-bron salamander on a wet leaf |
| Eurycea rathbuni | Texas blind salamander | Only lives in water-filled caves in the Edwards Plateau in Hays County | VU ‡ | A salamander with translucent skin and external gills |
| Eurycea robusta | Blanco blind salamander | Unknown, single specimen found in subterranean system under Blanco River in Hays County | DD † | |
| Eurycea chisholmensis | Salado Springs salamander | Endemic to area northeast of the Colorado River in the Edwards Plateau region of central Texas | VU | |
| Eurycea sosorum | Barton Springs salamander | Found only at outlets of Barton Springs in Zilker Park, Austin | VU ‡ | A dull pink salamander with conservative white spots and external gills |
| Eurycea tonkawae | Jollyville Plateau salamander | Endemic to the Buttercup Cave system near Austin | EN † | A slim salamander with translucent skin and external red gills emerges from under a rock |
| Eurycea tridentifera | Comal blind salamander | Endemic to Honey Creek Cave in Comal County and other caves in Cibolo Sinkhole Plain | VU † | |
| Eurycea troglodytes | Valdina Farms salamander | Endemic to springs and cave systems in the counties of Bandera, Edwards, western Kerr, Medina, Real, and Uvalde | DD | |
| Eurycea waterlooensis | Austin blind salamander | Known only from outflows of Barton Springs in Austin | VU ‡ | |
| Eurycea pterophila | Fern bank salamander | This species inhabits springs within the watershed of the Blanco River | DD | |
| Plethodon albagula | Western slimy salamander | Disjunct, and genetically divergent, populations in central, southeastern, and northeastern Texas | LC | A black salamander with white spots walks on a green surface |
| Plethodon serratus | Southern red-backed salamander | Although there are several populations throughout the southeast US, this species is only known in Texas from a single specimen collect in Nacogdoches County in 1940 | LC | Slim brown salamander with red stripe along back |

==== Family Sirenidae ====
Sirenidae are a family of aquatic salamanders only found in northern Mexico and the Southeastern United States. Family members, called sirens, have very small forelimbs and lack hind limbs altogether. Sirens are generally regarded as the most primitive extant salamanders.

Sirenidae
| Species | Common name | Distribution | Status | Image |
|---|---|---|---|---|
| Siren intermedia nettingi | Western lesser siren | Found in east and southeast Texas, as well as in the Rio Grande Valley | LC | A long dark salamander lacking hindlimbs |
| Siren intermedia texana | Rio Grande lesser siren | Occurs in south Texas | NE † | |

==== Family Proteidae ====
Proteidae are a family of aquatic salamanders only found in North America and Europe. Some members are called mudpuppies, waterdogs, or olms. They are paedomorphic and exhibit laterally compressed tail fins and the red, filamentous external gills. Only one species of Proteidae is found in Texas.

Proteidae
| Species | Common name | Distribution | Status | Image |
|---|---|---|---|---|
| Necturus beyeri | Gulf Coast waterdog | Found in the Sabine River System | LC | A spotted salamander with red gills. |

== See also ==
- Geography of Texas
- List of birds of Texas
- List of mammals of Texas
- List of reptiles of Texas

== Notes and references ==
=== Notes ===
a: Conservation status at a world level of the species according to the IUCN Red List: Conservation status – IUCN Red List of Threatened Species:

EX – Extinct
EW – Extinct in the wild
CR – Critically endangered
EN – Endangered
VU – Vulnerable
NT – Near threatened
LC – Least concern
DD – Data deficient
NE – Not evaluated

b: Both are subspecies of Siren intermedia, the lesser siren.
c: The status of Siren intermedia texana as a distinct subspecies is contested. Some researchers have claimed that it is indistinguishable from Siren intermedia nettingi.
