= Geomys streckeri =

Strecker's pocket gopher

Conservation status
- Critically Imperiled (NatureServe)

Scientific classification
- Kingdom: Animalia
- Phylum: Chordata
- Class: Mammalia
- Order: Rodentia
- Family: Geomyidae
- Genus: Geomys
- Species: G. streckeri

Binomial name
- Geomys streckeri W. B. Davis, 1943

Synonyms
- Geomys personatus streckeri W. B. Davis, 1943

Species of rodent

Geomys streckeri, also known as Strecker's pocket gopher, is a species of pocket gopher found in Texas. It was formerly considered a subspecies of the Texas pocket gopher. Chromosomal analyses have proven this species to be distinct. Analysis of its mitochondrial cytochrome b points to this species being a sister clade to Geomys personatus, Geomys attwateri, and Geomys tropicalis. Other evidence, using a Bayesian analysis of ribosomal RNA and certain proteins, points to it being embedded within the G. personatus clade and being a sister species to G. attwateri.

It is named after John Kern Strecker, an American herpetologist and namesake of the Strecker Museum.
