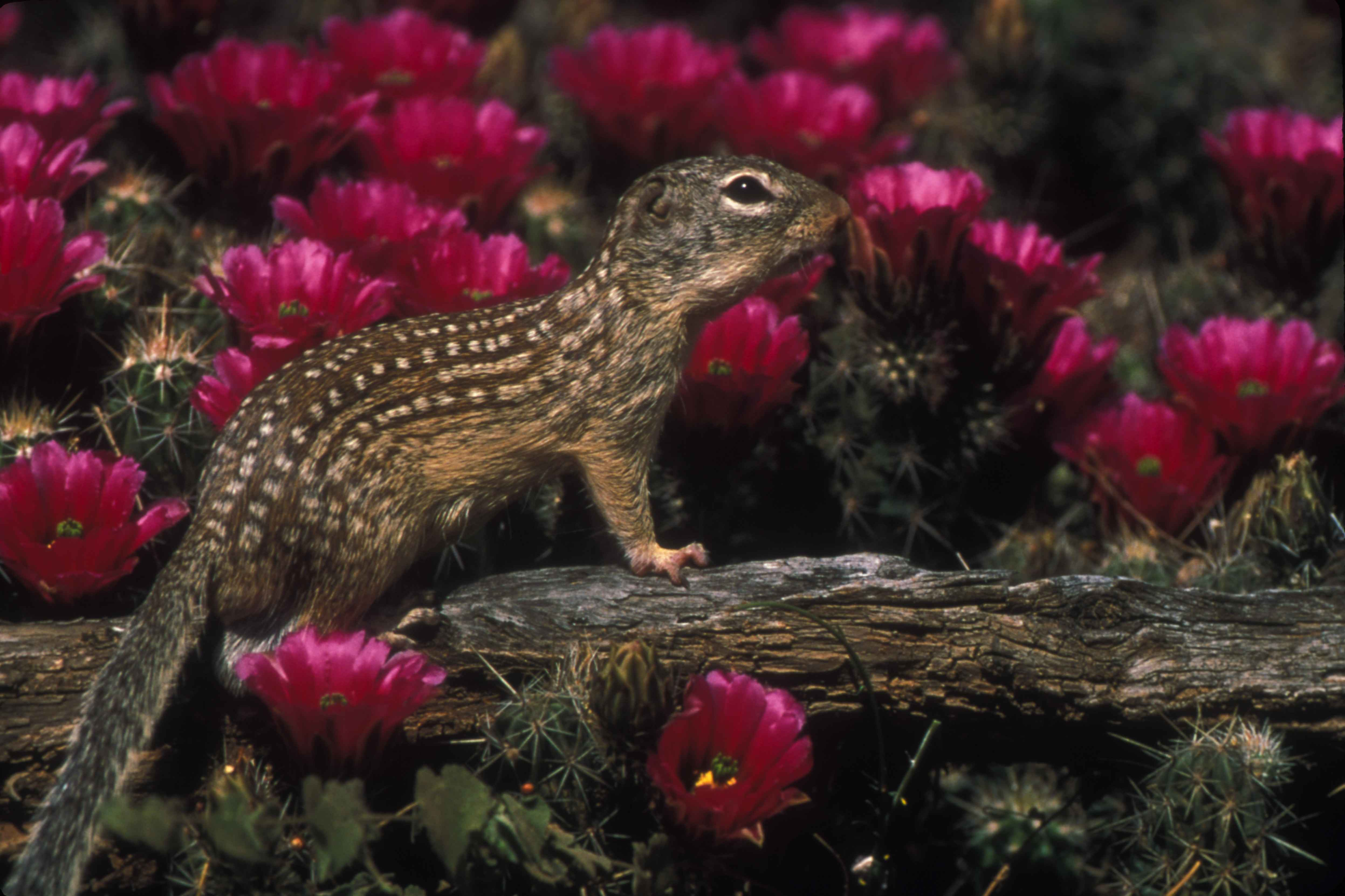
- Mexican ground squirrel (Ictidomys mexicanus)

Scientific classification
- Kingdom: Animalia
- Phylum: Chordata
- Class: Mammalia
- Order: Rodentia
- Family: Sciuridae
- Tribe: Marmotini
- Genus: Ictidomys; J. A. Allen, 1877

Type species
- Citellus tridecemlineatus Mitchill, 1821

Species
- Ictidomys mexicanus; Ictidomys parvidens; Ictidomys tridecemlineatus

= Ictidomys =

Genus of rodents

Ictidomys is a North American genus of rodent in the squirrel family, which contains the thirteen-lined ground squirrel, the Mexican ground squirrel, and the Rio Grande ground squirrel. These species were included in the species-rich ground squirrel genus Spermophilus until molecular data showed that this genus was not a natural, monophyletic grouping.

== Species ==
Image	Scientific name	Common name	Distribution
	Ictidomys mexicanus	Mexican ground squirrel	Central Mexico.
	Ictidomys parvidens	Rio Grande ground squirrel	United States (Texas and New Mexico) and in north-eastern Mexico.
	Ictidomys tridecemlineatus	Thirteen-lined ground squirrel	North America
