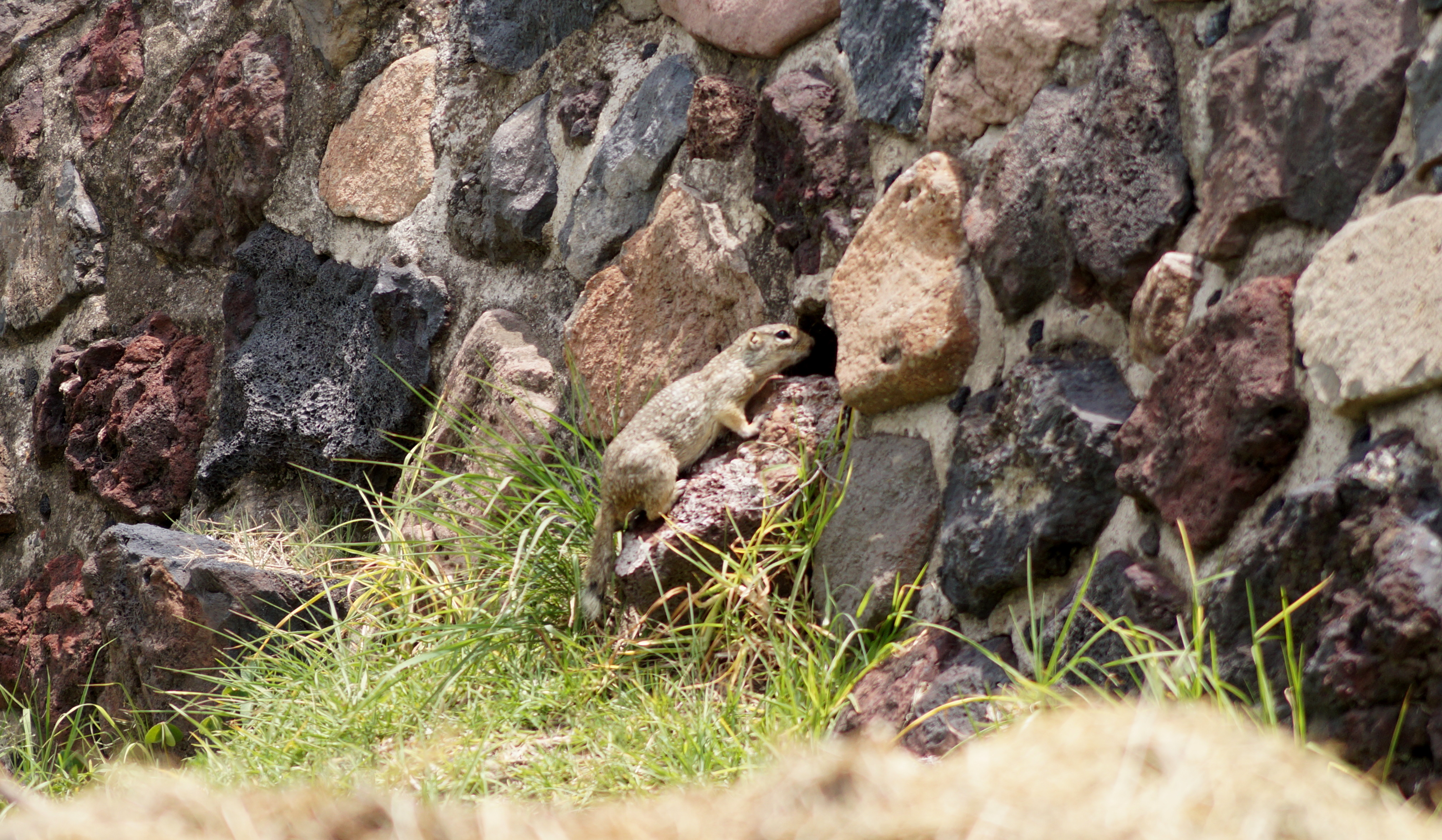

Conservation status
- Least Concern (IUCN 3.1)

Scientific classification
- Kingdom: Animalia
- Phylum: Chordata
- Class: Mammalia
- Infraclass: Placentalia
- Order: Rodentia
- Family: Sciuridae
- Genus: Ictidomys
- Species: I. mexicanus

Binomial name
- Ictidomys mexicanus (Erxleben, 1777)

Synonyms
- Spermophilus mexicanus

= Mexican ground squirrel =

Species of rodent

The Mexican ground squirrel (Ictidomys mexicanus) is a species of rodent in the family Sciuridae. It is endemic to central Mexico.

== Description ==
The Mexican ground squirrel is a small to medium-sized rodent with nine rows of white spots on its back. It ranges in body length from 32.2 centimetres (12.7 in) to 38.0 centimetres (15.0 in).

== Distribution and habitat ==
The Mexican ground squirrel is found in central Mexico from Jalisco to Puebla. It typically occupies grasslands and brush habitats where it is often associated with mesquite and nopal cactus. It may also be found up to 3,200 metres (10,500 ft).

== Taxonomy ==
The Mexican ground squirrel was historically considered to have two disjunct subspecies; with one occurring in central Mexico (Spermophilus mexicanus mexicanus) and one occurring in the southwestern United States and northern Mexico (Spermophilus mexicanus parvidens). In 2009, the northern population was reclassified as a distinct species, the Rio Grande ground squirrel, due to its smaller body size and geographic isolation.
