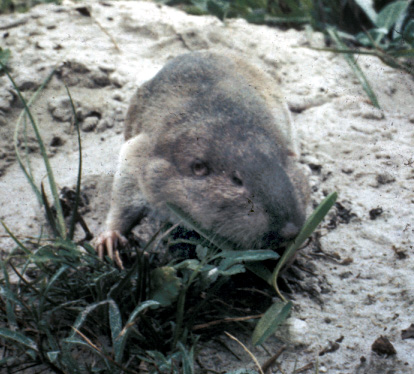

Conservation status
- Least Concern (IUCN 3.1)

Scientific classification
- Kingdom: Animalia
- Phylum: Chordata
- Class: Mammalia
- Infraclass: Placentalia
- Order: Rodentia
- Family: Geomyidae
- Genus: Geomys
- Species: G. personatus

Binomial name
- Geomys personatus F. W. True, 1889

= Texas pocket gopher =

Species of rodent

The Texas pocket gopher (Geomys personatus) is a species of rodent in the family Geomyidae. It is found in Tamaulipas in Mexico and in Texas in the United States.

== Description ==
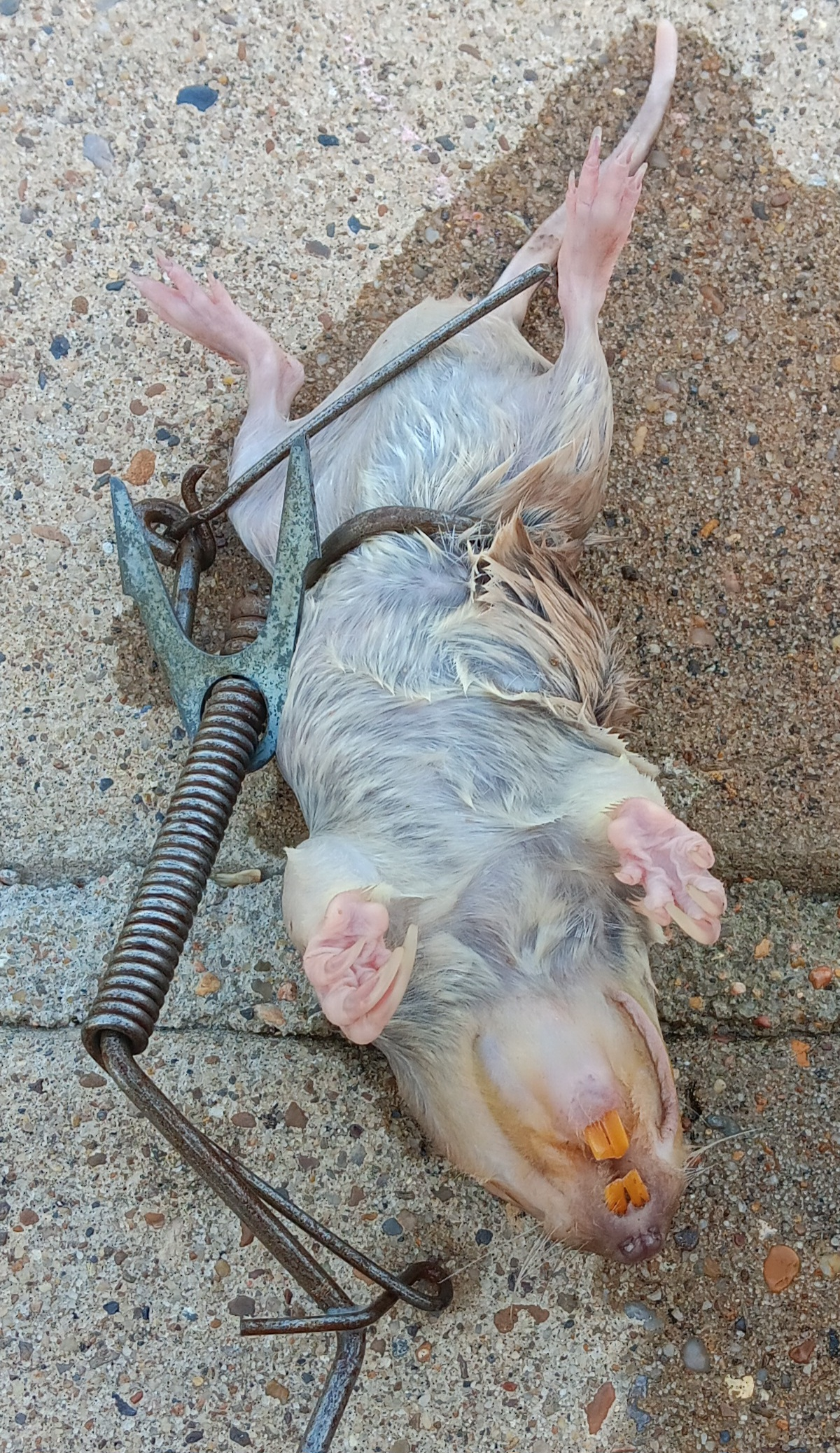
Trapped pocket gopher from Nueces County, Texas, US

Males grow to a length of about 32 cm (12.6 in) including a tail of about 11 cm (4.3 in). Females are slightly smaller and both sexes weigh about 400 grams (14 oz). The dorsal surface is a dull greyish-brown and the ventral surface is whitish with darker patches. There is very little hair on the tail especially near the tip. The upper incisors have a pair of grooves.

== Distribution ==
The Texas pocket gopher is found in southern Texas as far north as Val Verde County and San Patricio County, and the state of Tamaulipas, the most north-easterly part of Mexico. Its range is patchy and disjointed, similarly to other Geomys species. It is common in the sand drifts on Mustang and Padre islands in the Gulf of Mexico. The population around Maverick County, Zavala County, and Dimmit County was recently recognized as a distinct species, Strecker's pocket gopher.

== Behavior ==
A single Texas pocket gopher occupies a burrow system that may have short side branches and about 30 m (98 ft) of passages. It defends its burrow against intruders, emitting a wheezy call and gnashing its teeth. It mainly stays underground and plugs the surface entrances with soil. The spoil heap of excavated soil can be 50 cm (20 in) across and 12 cm (5 in) high. The Texas pocket gopher feeds on the roots of grasses such as paspalum (Paspalum), Bermuda grass (Cynodon), and sandbur (Cenchrus) and consumes all parts of a composite plant in the sunflower genus Helianthus. It avoids emerging onto the surface of the ground, where it is at risk from predators, by seizing the roots of the plant and pulling it down into its burrow. It also practices coprophagy, eating some of its own fecal pellets: it takes the pellets with its teeth directly from its anus, manipulates them with its fore-feet, and examines them carefully. It then consumes some and rejects others; however, the basis for its choice is unclear.

Little is known about the reproductive behavior of this species but it appears to breed at any time of year. Litters of from one to five young have been recorded and there are believed to be up to two litters in the year.

== Status ==
The Texas pocket gopher has a wide range and is common in at least part of that range, with a patchy distribution attributable to its requirement for loose, sandy soils in which to burrow. The IUCN lists its conservation status as being of "least concern" because, although the population trend is unknown, it is unlikely to be declining at such a rate as to warrant listing it in a more threatened category.
