= Knox Jones's pocket gopher =

Conservation status
- Least Concern (IUCN 3.1)

Scientific classification
- Kingdom: Animalia
- Phylum: Chordata
- Class: Mammalia
- Order: Rodentia
- Family: Geomyidae
- Genus: Geomys
- Species: G. knoxjonesi

Binomial name
- Geomys knoxjonesi Baker & Genoways, 1975

Synonyms
- Geomys bursarius knoxjonesi

Species of rodent

Knox Jones's pocket gopher (Geomys knoxjonesi) is a species of pocket gopher found in Texas and New Mexico. This species is named for Dr. J. Knox Jones Jr. (1929–1992), a prolific mammalogist at Texas Tech University.

It is a relatively small gopher, with a total length of about 24 cm (9.4 in), including an 8 cm (3.1 in) tail, and weighing from 160 to 185 g (5.6 to 6.5 oz). Males are slightly larger than females. It has a typical gopher-like body, with large, clawed, forelimbs, small eyes and ears, and a fur-lined cheek pouches. The fur is buff-brown fur and fades to white on the belly and feet. It is visually indistinguishable from the plains pocket gopher, and was formerly considered to be a subspecies of that animal, before being raised to full species status in 1989 on the basis of genetic differences.

Knox Jones's pocket gopher is found in the central western regions of Texas, roughly between the counties of Ward, Martin, and Cochran, and in southeastern New Mexico as far as Chaves County. Within this region, it inhabits areas with deep sandy soils, rather than the harder loamy soils favoured by the plains pocket gopher, and feeds on the roots and stems of plants such as yucca, sunflowers, and various grasses.

The gopher is territorial and solitary, except during the October to April breeding season. Gestation lasts about 23 days, and the young are weaned after three to four weeks.
