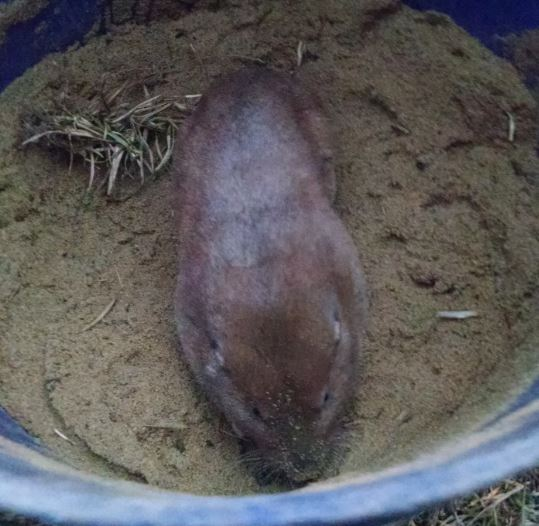

Conservation status
- Least Concern (IUCN 3.1)

Scientific classification
- Kingdom: Animalia
- Phylum: Chordata
- Class: Mammalia
- Order: Rodentia
- Family: Geomyidae
- Genus: Geomys
- Species: G. pinetis

Binomial name
- Geomys pinetis Rafinesque, 1817

Subspecies
- G. p. austrinus G. p. colonus G. p. cumberlandius G. p. floridanus G. p. fontanelus G. p. mobilensis †G. p. goffi

= Southeastern pocket gopher =

Species of rodent

The southeastern pocket gopher (Geomys pinetis) is a species of pocket gopher that is native to the southeastern United States. It occurs in Alabama, Georgia, and Florida, where it is the only pocket gopher.

== Description ==
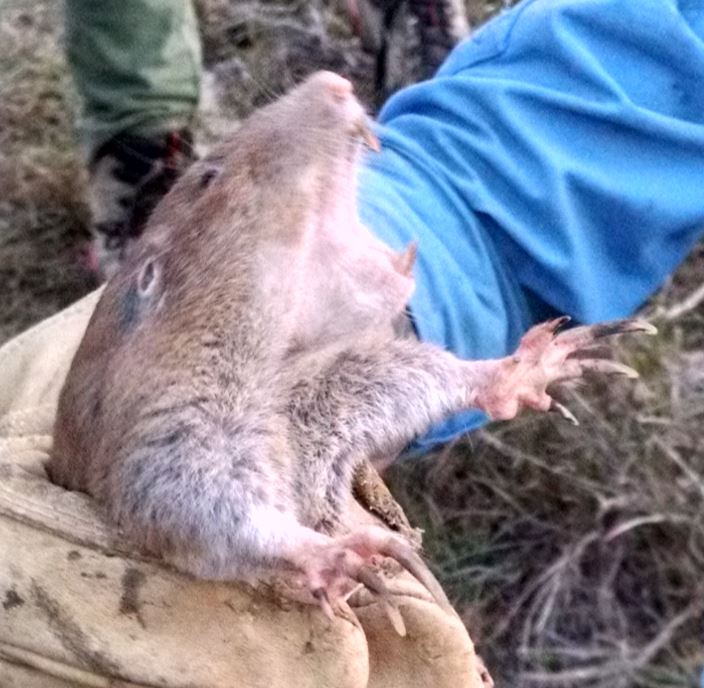
Closeup of its protruding teeth and fossorial claws

The southeastern pocket gopher is rather smaller than the plains pocket gopher (Geomys bursarius), with a total length of 260 mm (10.2 in) including a tail of about 86 mm (3.4 in). Males are larger than females and average 176 g (6.2 oz) in weight while the females average 136 g (4.8 oz). The dorsal fur is cinnamon brown with the underparts rather paler and tinged with buff or reddish-yellow. The feet and tail are white or pale buff. As with other members of this family, the external cheek pouches can be turned inside-out for grooming purposes. It is well adapted for living underground with large, protruding incisor teeth, used for tearing at roots, and powerful claws on the forefeet for digging.

== Distribution and habitat ==
This gopher is restricted to the southeastern part of the United States, where it occurs in Alabama, Georgia and Florida. It occupies several different dry, sandy habitats; it occurs in sand-hill country with longleaf pine (Pinus palustris) and turkey oak (Quercus laevis), and it also occurs in slightly moister hammocks (low mounds) among the sand-hills with Quercus virginiana and other hardwood trees. Away from the sand dunes, it occurs in longleaf pine woodland and scrubby sand pine (Pinus clausa) habitats. Its presence in any area is obvious because of the numerous piles of sandy soil it pushes to the surface.

The subspecies G. p. mobilensis, found west of the Apalachicola River may represent a distinct species. Genetic studies have shown it to be relatively different genetically from the other subspecies, and G. p. mobilensis have a different species of louse than the nominate subspecies. Lice typically speciate with their host species within the Geomyidae.

== Ecology ==
G. pinetis is a solitary animal and creates shallow tunnels above which are a series of mounds of excavated material. The soil is pushed upwards by the front limbs and chest and creates a fan-shaped mound with the tunnel at one side. The burrow entrance is immediately blocked with soil. These shallow tunnels are connected to a deeper tunnel system by a spiral "staircase". Down below are the food chambers and a nest chamber which may contain dried vegetation and plant fibres.

Breeding takes place in spring and summer, peaking around February/March and June/July. The gestation period is about four weeks and the average litter size is two. Despite this low level of fecundity, the southeastern pocket gopher is a common animal, implying that there is good survivability of the offspring. The presence of green forage in the diet and the fact that owls sometimes feed on them show that the gophers do emerge above ground sometimes. However, predators underground are few, the chief dangers being snakes and weasels.

The southeastern pocket gopher is active throughout the year. It feeds on roots and rhizomes below ground, and on green plants such as grasses, sedges and weeds which it can reach from near the entrance to the burrow. Large quantities of vegetation are gathered and carried back to store chambers in the burrow. Because its burrows promote plant growth, a case can be made that they are farmers. A number of arthropods share the burrows with the gophers, including about fourteen species that are found nowhere else. The gophers are attracted to cultivated land, particularly sweet potato crops, and can also be a pest in peanut and pea crops, and sugarcane plantations.

== See also ==
- Non-human agriculture
