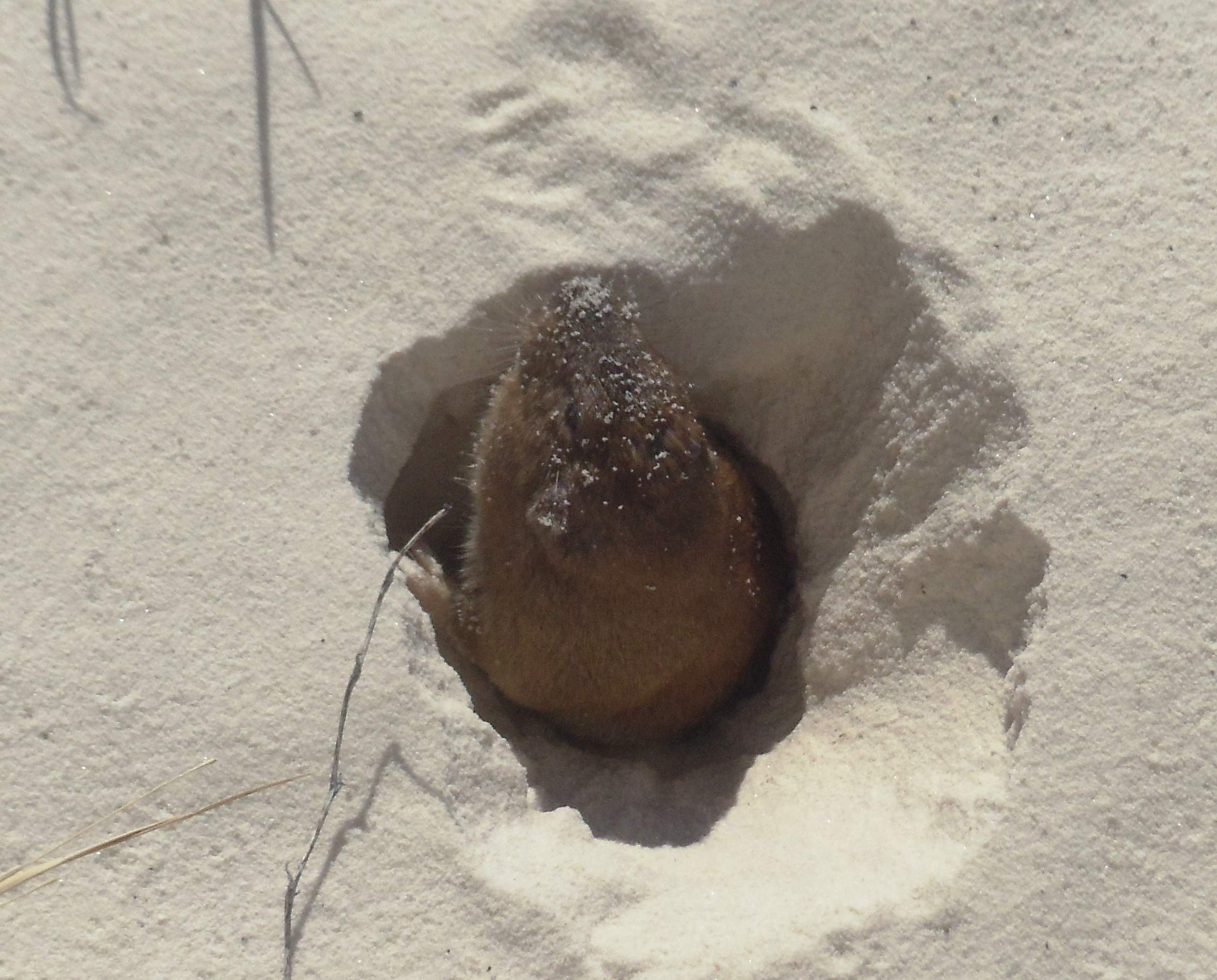

Conservation status
- Near Threatened (IUCN 3.1)

Scientific classification
- Kingdom: Animalia
- Phylum: Chordata
- Class: Mammalia
- Infraclass: Placentalia
- Order: Rodentia
- Family: Geomyidae
- Genus: Geomys
- Species: G. arenarius

Binomial name
- Geomys arenarius Merriam, 1895

= Desert pocket gopher =

Species of rodent

The desert pocket gopher (Geomys arenarius) is a species of rodent in the family Geomyidae. It is found in the state of Chihuahua in Mexico and in Texas and New Mexico in the United States.

== Description ==
G. arenarius is a medium sized rodent, with a relatively long and hairy tail, and pale coloration. Like other gophers, their bodies are thicker than other rodents, eyes are reduced, and they are equipped with large, strong-clawed forelimbs allowing them to be fossorial. Their fur is a dull brown along their backs, with scattered black tipped hairs. The dull brown coloration continues dorsally and laterally until it reaches the chest, abdomen and feet, where it sometimes blends with the white hair of these areas.

== Phylogeny ==
The desert pocket gopher is in the genus Geomys, within the family Geomyidae within the order Rodentia. The evolutionary history of G. arenarius has been studied by several different parties, but the exact phylogeny is still being decided. While there was evidence to give the G. arenarius its own taxon based on genetic and morphological uniqueness, some researchers believe it is actually a subspecies of G. bursarius because of the similarities between the two rodents. No solid argument has been made to dispute the status of G. arenarius as its own species, but many researchers report that it is a subspecies, it has merely been separated by allopatric speciation. When this species is given full species status, two subspecies are recognized, G. a arenarius and G. a. brevirostris.

== Ecology ==
=== Distribution and habitat ===
Desert pocket gophers mostly inhabit a narrow strip of land following the upper Rio Grande Valley from Chihuahua, Mexico, then proceeding north and west into parts of New Mexico and Texas in the United States. Due to their restricted home range size, they are isolated from other members of Geomys.

This species has a very patchy and disjointed distribution. The subspecies G. a. brevirostris is the more northern subspecies. The main G. a. brevirostris population is in White Sands National Park in the Tularosa Basin of New Mexico. Two small populations of this subspecies occur: one south of Gran Quivira and one in the Jornada del Muerto basin. G. a. arenarius is more widespread, living along the Rio Grande and its tributaries, in southern New Mexico, western Texas, and northern Chihuahua. The population in the Deming Plains near Columbus, New Mexico is possibly extinct.

Desert pocket gophers prefer areas of well-traveled, loose soil, or sandy riverbanks; places that are easy to tunnel into and make a burrow. They are commonly found near open water like rivers, ponds, or irrigation canals. The areas they inhabit are usually skirted by rocky plains or desert. Their preferred climate is one that is arid and moisture deficient, where summers are long and hot and winters are short and moderate in temperature.

In comparison to other gopher species, the desert pocket gopher-depending on the properties of the soil-can have a significant effect on the soils in the habitats it dwells in because it causes more disturbance from its digging than other species do.
