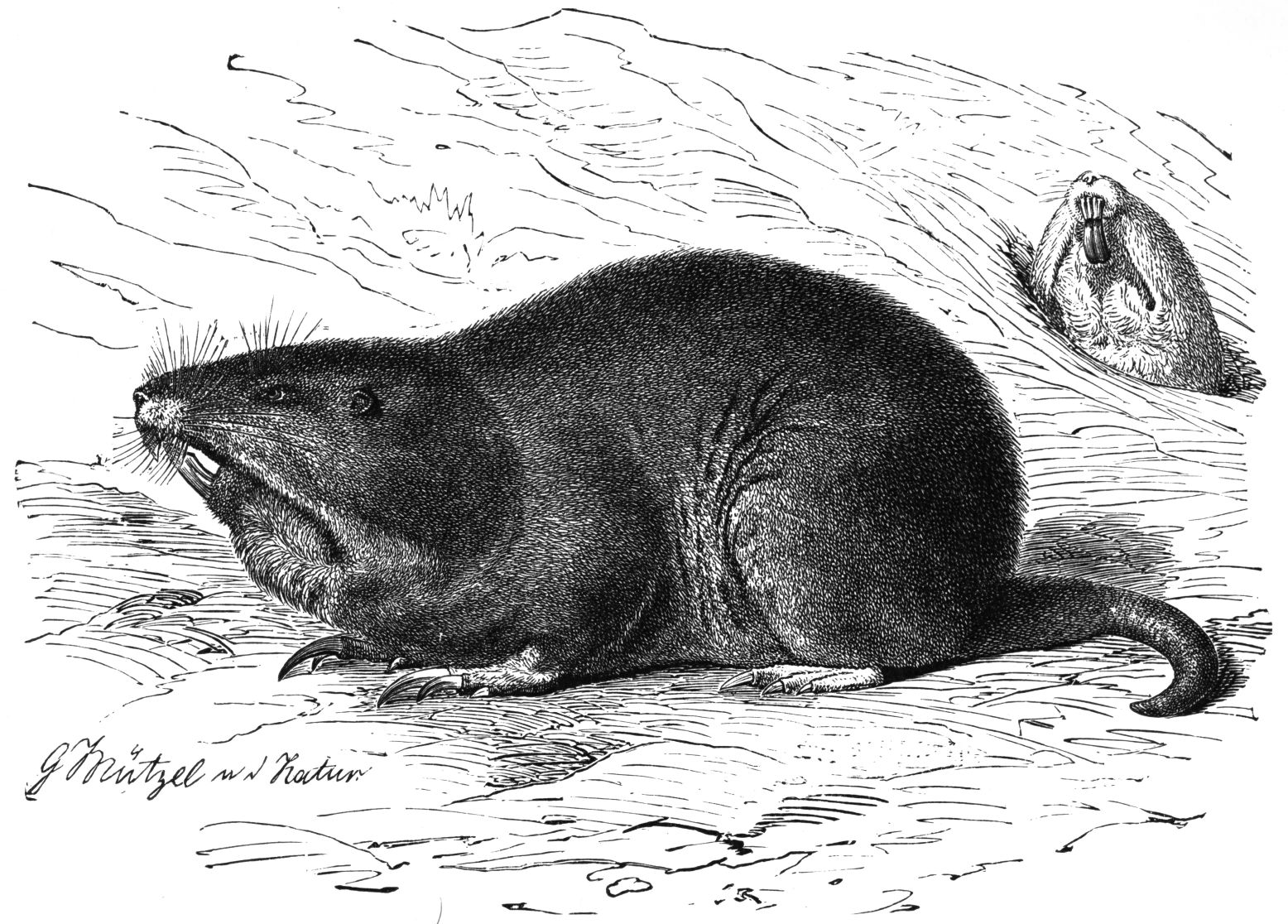
- Plains pocket gopher, Geomys bursarius

Scientific classification
- Kingdom: Animalia
- Phylum: Chordata
- Class: Mammalia
- Infraclass: Placentalia
- Order: Rodentia
- Family: Geomyidae
- Genus: Geomys; Rafinesque, 1817

Type species
- Geomys pinetis Rafinesque, 1817

Species
- See text
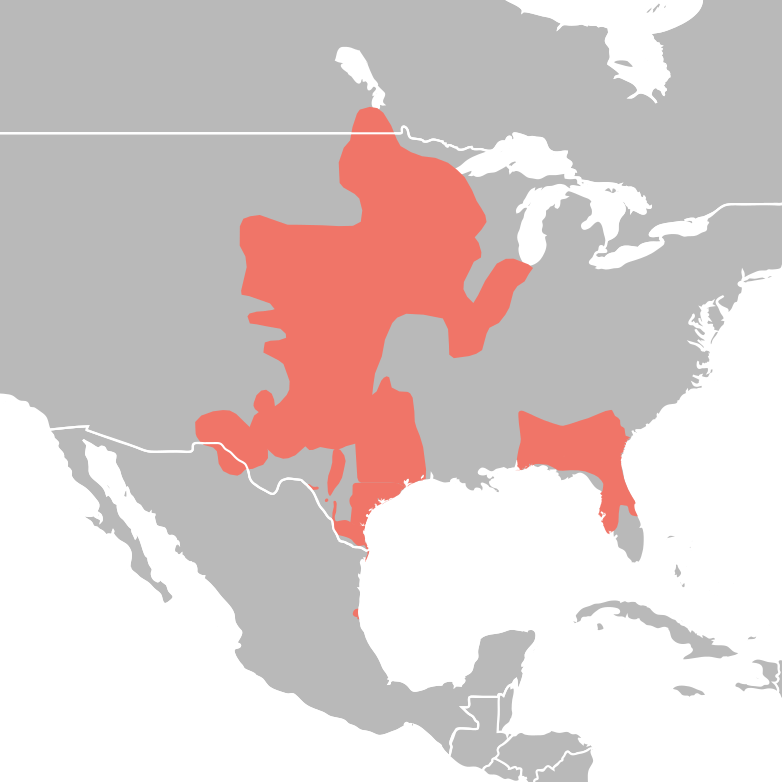
- Geomys distribution

= Geomys =

Geomys Temporal range: Late Miocene - Recent

Genus of rodents

The genus Geomys contains 12 extant species of pocket gophers often collectively referred to as the eastern pocket gophers. Like all pocket gophers, members of this genus are fossorial herbivores.

== Species ==
Extant species include:

- Desert pocket gopher (Geomys arenarius)
- Attwater's pocket gopher (G. attwateri)
- Baird's pocket gopher (G. breviceps)
- Plains pocket gopher (G. bursarius)
- Hall's pocket gopher (G. jugossicularis)
- Knox Jones's pocket gopher (G. knoxjonesi)
- Sand Hills pocket gopher (G. lutescens)
- Texas pocket gopher (G. personatus)
- Southeastern pocket gopher (G. pinetis)
- Strecker's pocket gopher (G. streckeri)
- Central Texas pocket gopher (G. texensis)
- Tropical pocket gopher (G. tropicalis)

Extinct species:

- †Geomys tyrioni
