= Thirteen-lined ground squirrel =

Conservation status
- Least Concern (IUCN 3.1)

Scientific classification
- Kingdom: Animalia
- Phylum: Chordata
- Class: Mammalia
- Infraclass: Placentalia
- Order: Rodentia
- Family: Sciuridae
- Genus: Ictidomys
- Species: I. tridecemlineatus

Binomial name
- Ictidomys tridecemlineatus (Mitchill, 1821)
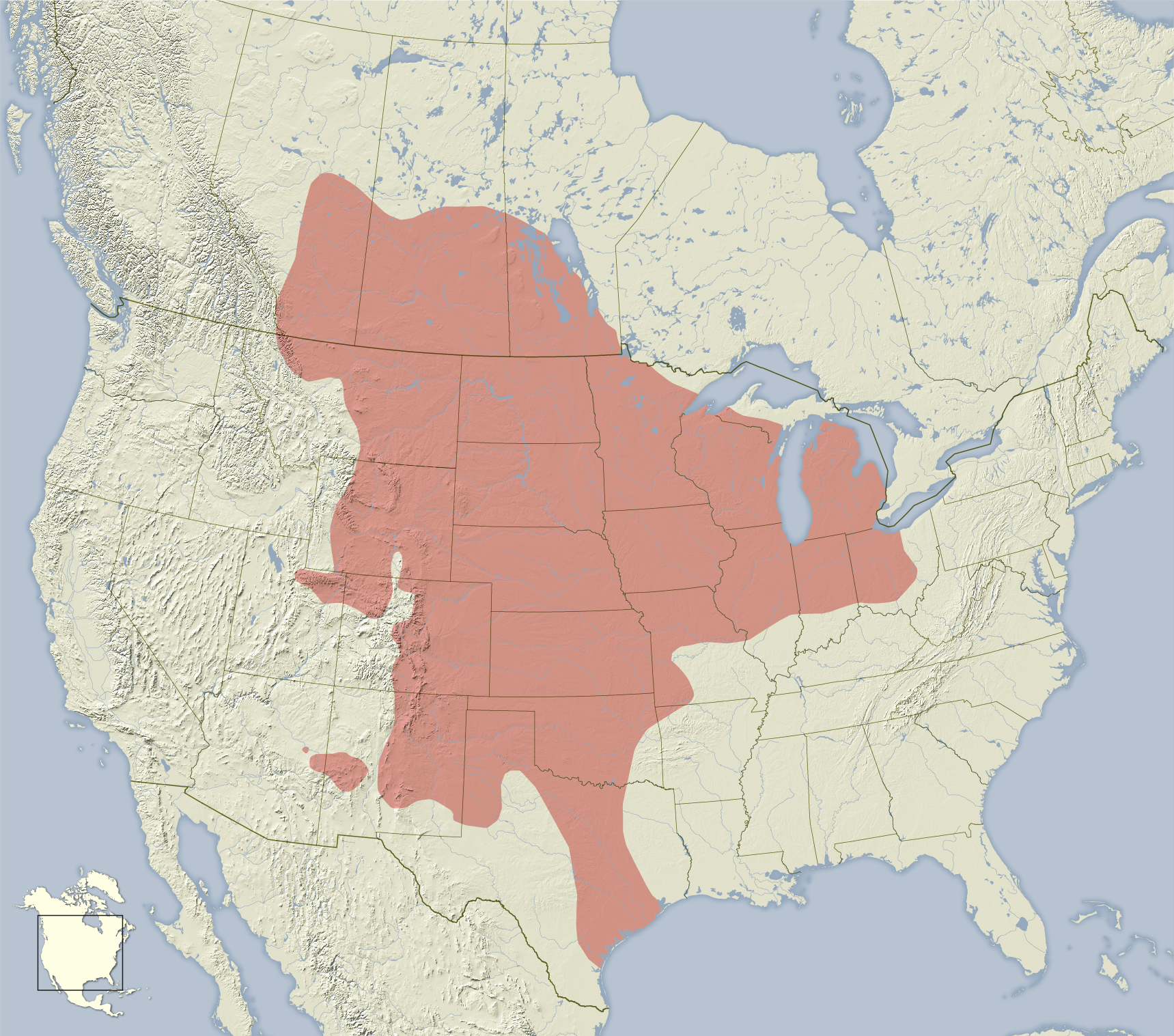

Synonyms
- Spermophilus tridecemlineatus

Species of rodent

The thirteen-lined ground squirrel (Ictidomys tridecemlineatus), also known as the striped gopher, leopard ground squirrel, and squinny (formerly known as the leopard-spermophile in the age of Audubon), is a species of hibernating ground squirrel that is widely distributed over grasslands and prairies of North America.

== Description ==
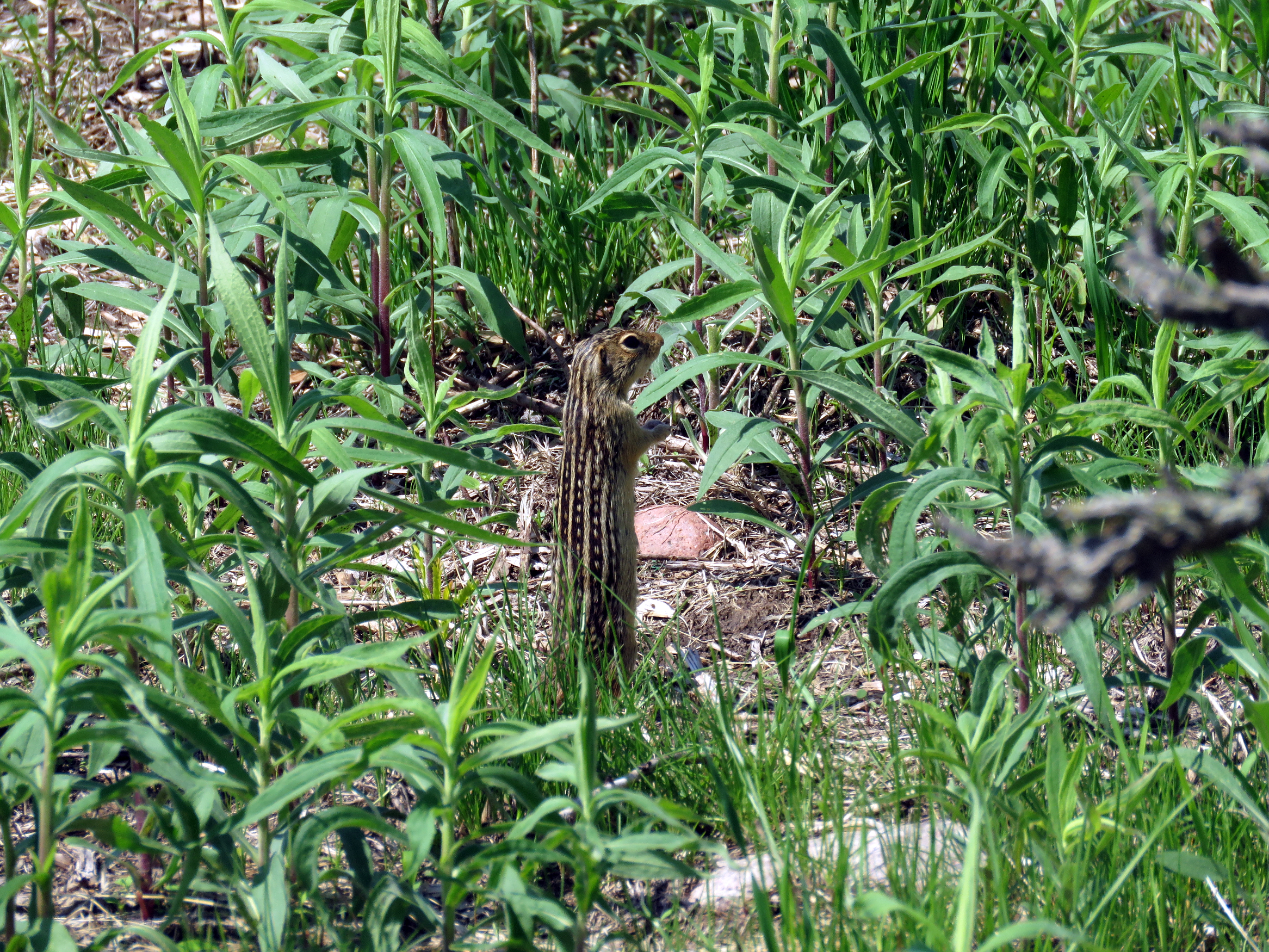
The animal is well camouflaged and frequently stands to keep watch.

It is brownish, with 13 alternating brown and whitish longitudinal lines (sometimes partially broken into spots) on its back and sides, creating rows of whitish spots within dark lines.

Biological statistics
Length	6 3/4–11 5/8 inches (170–297 mm)
Tail	2 3/8–5 1/4 inches (60–132 mm)
Head	1–1 5/8 inches (27–41 mm)
Weight	3 7/8–9 1/2 oz (110–270 g)

== Taxonomy ==
This species has usually been placed in the genus Spermophilus with about 40 other species. As this large genus is paraphyletic to prairie dogs, marmots, and antelope squirrels, Kristofer Helgen and colleagues have split it into eight genera, placing the thirteen-lined ground squirrel in Ictidomys with two other species.

== Behavior ==
The thirteen-lined ground squirrel is strictly diurnal and is especially active on warm days. A solitary or only somewhat colonial hibernator, it often occurs in aggregations in suitable habitats.

In late summer, it puts on a heavy layer of fat and stores some food in its burrow. It enters its nest in October (some adults retire much earlier), rolls into a stiff ball, and decreases its respiration from between 100 and 200 breaths per minute to one breath about every five minutes. It emerges in March or early April.

The burrow may be 15 to 20 feet (4.6 to 6.1 metres) long, with several side passages. Most of the burrow is within one to two feet (about half a meter) of the surface, with only the hibernation nest in a special deeper section. Shorter burrows are dug as hiding places. This ground squirrel's home range is two to three acres (0.8 to 1.2 ha).

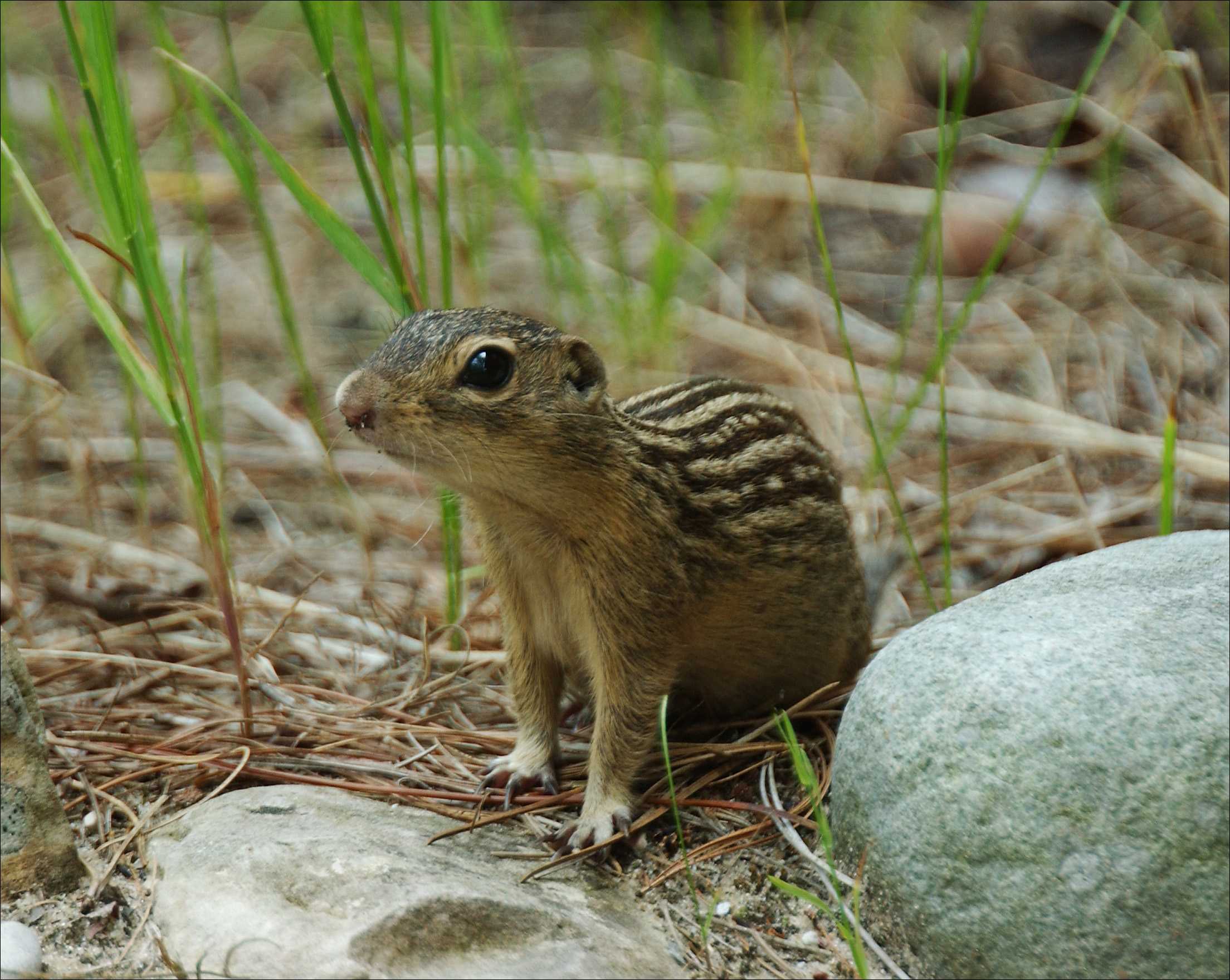

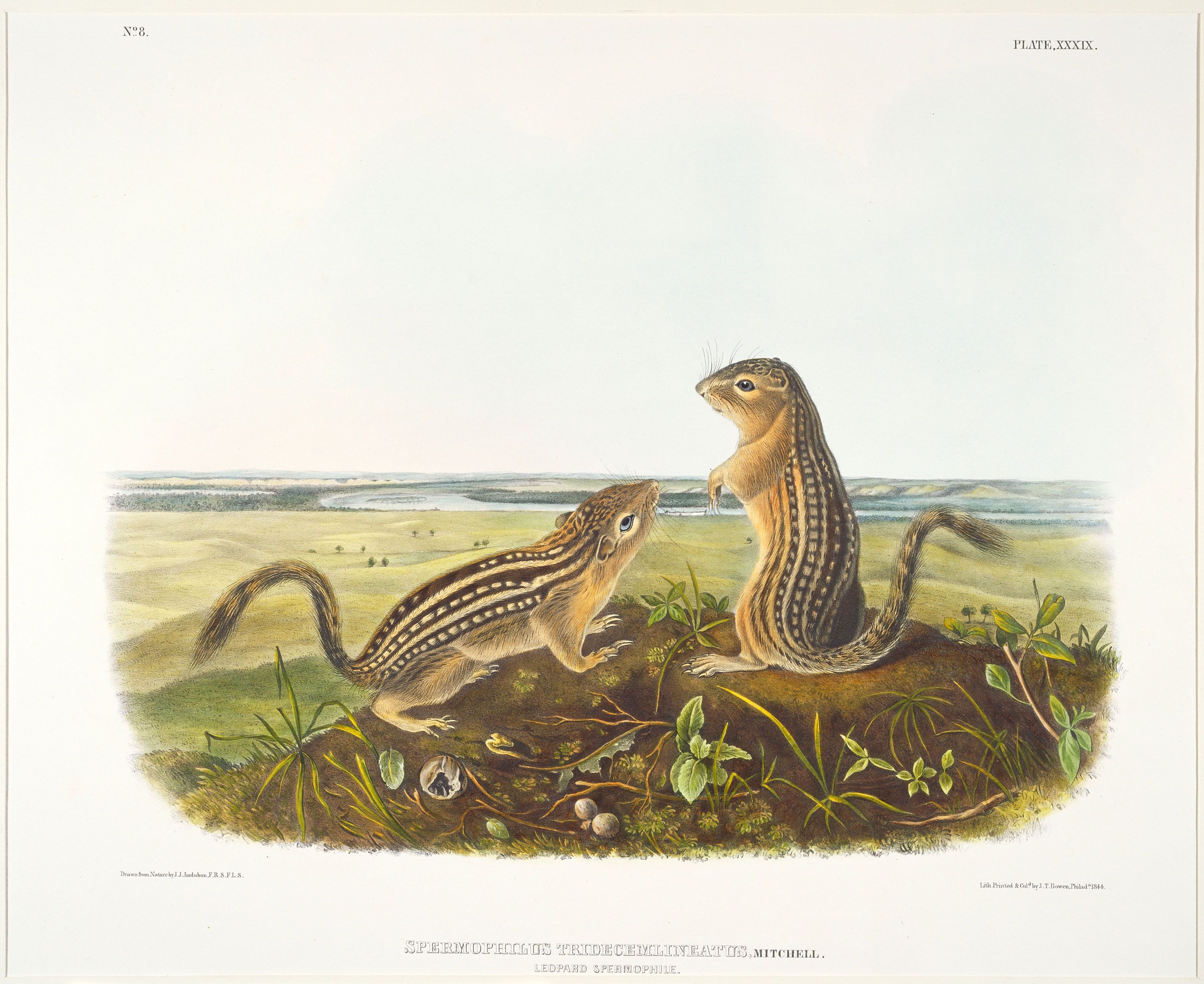
Late in life, naturalist John James Audubon made a final expedition to the western plains in search of four-footed mammals. These striped ground squirrels would be tempting prey for many birds, especially hawks and owls. After the squirrels had left, burrowing owls might take over their underground dens.

Its primary diet includes grass and weed seeds, caterpillars, grasshoppers, and crickets, but it may also eat mice and shrews; it will viciously attack and consume cicadas if able to catch them. This squirrel sometimes damages gardens by digging burrows and eating vegetables, but also devours weed seeds and harmful insects.

It is well known for standing upright to survey its domain, diving down into its burrow when it senses danger, then sometimes poking out its nose and giving a bird-like trill. The "trill" is an alarm call that is most often used by females to warn nearby relatives. It has a maximum running speed of 8 mph (13 km/h) and reverses direction if chased.

The thirteen-lined ground squirrels have solitary habits, shown by agonistic behaviors to squirrels invading their own areas, which they've evolved, requiring less energy and the risk of getting injured. Tail-flicking is also evolved from their solitary habits, which allows them not to violate other squirrel individuals' space.

== Hibernation ==
Thirteen-lined ground squirrels can survive in hibernation for over six months without food or water and special physiological adaptations allow them to do so. They alternate between torpor bouts of 7 to 10 days when their body temperatures drops to 5-7°C, and interbout arousals of less than 24 hours with their body temperature back to 37°C. During torpor, these squirrels maintain hydration by depleting their body fluids of osmolytes like sodium, glucose, and blood urea nitrogen. When they enter a transient active-like state, small periods of arousal where these squirrels return to an active-like state temporarily, blood osmolarity and antidiuretic hormone levels rise while thirst remains suppressed. Thirst suppression is sustained throughout the hibernation period by a reduced activity of neurons in the circumventricular organs.

Thirteen-lined ground squirrels also suppress the cell cycle and control the expression of cell cycle regulators in the liver during hibernation to conserve energy. Moreover, they are able to maintain their muscle contractile performance during hibernation. Although scientists determined that there is a reduction in the squirrels' muscle mass during torpor, this does not significantly change the muscles' contractile properties. During hibernation, thirteen-lined ground squirrels prioritize skeletal muscle tissue for maintenance and potential regrowth. They also increase their muscle antioxidant capacity during torpor to protect tissue from oxidative damage associated with the restoration of blood flow during the transition period from torpor to arousal. During hibernation, they mobilize fatty acids for fuel instead of glycogen, which is kept constant during hibernation. During their active-like state, they are able to resume their cell cycle.

== See also ==
- Golden-mantled ground squirrel
- Chipmunk an animal with a similar appearance of stripes
