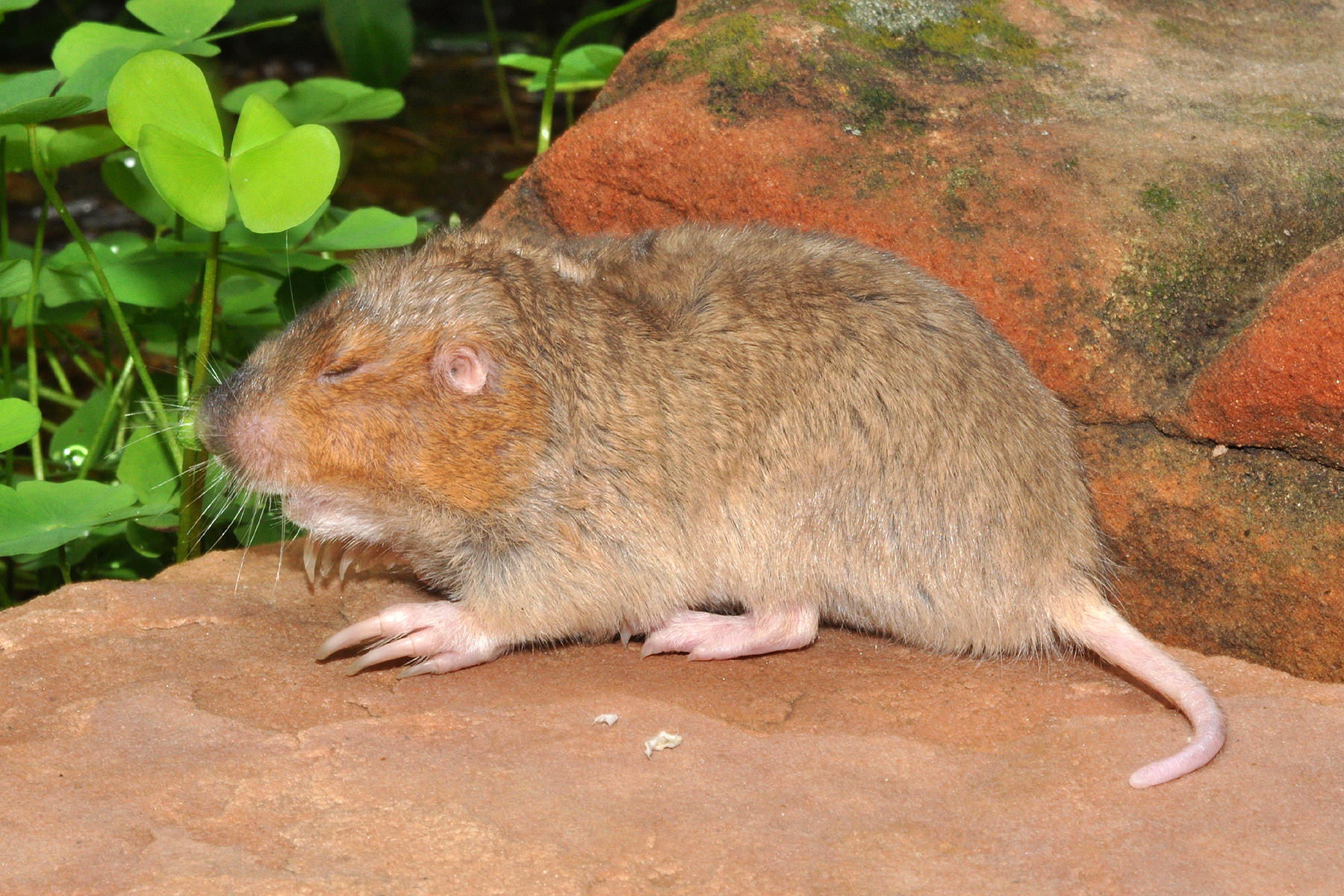

Conservation status
- Least Concern (IUCN 3.1)

Scientific classification
- Kingdom: Animalia
- Phylum: Chordata
- Class: Mammalia
- Order: Rodentia
- Family: Geomyidae
- Genus: Geomys
- Species: G. attwateri

Binomial name
- Geomys attwateri Merriam, 1895

Synonyms
- Geomys bursarius attwateri

= Attwater's pocket gopher =

Species of rodent

Attwater's pocket gopher (Geomys attwateri) is a species of rodent in the family Geomyidae. It is endemic to the Texas Coastal Bend in the southcentral United States.

This species was named in honor of English naturalist Henry Philemon Attwater.
