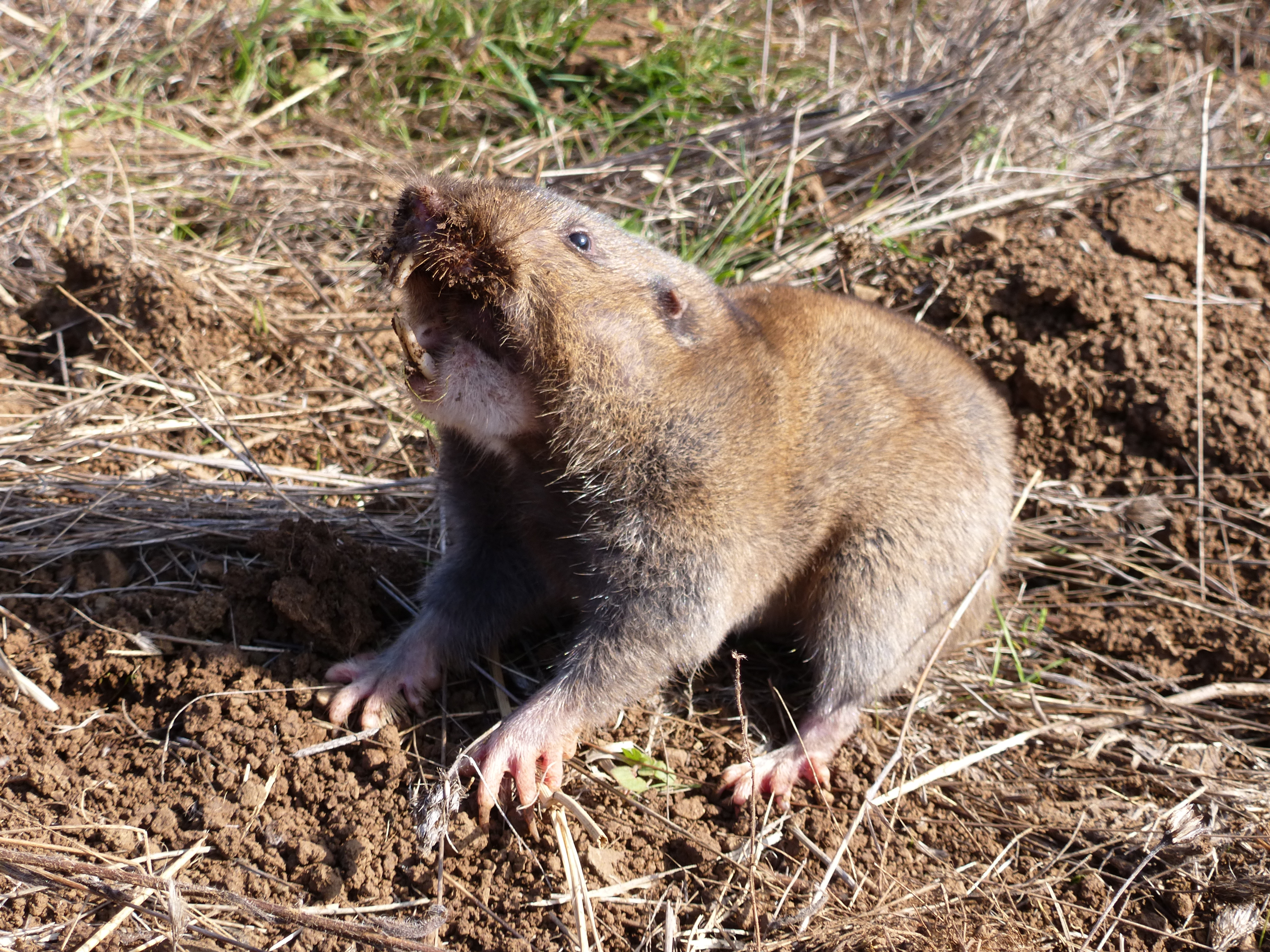

Conservation status
- Least Concern (IUCN 3.1)

Scientific classification
- Kingdom: Animalia
- Phylum: Chordata
- Class: Mammalia
- Order: Rodentia
- Family: Geomyidae
- Genus: Thomomys
- Subgenus: Megascapheus
- Species: T. bulbivorus

Binomial name
- Thomomys bulbivorus (Richardson, 1829)
- Distribution of the camas pocket gopher in the Willamette Valley of northwest Oregon

Synonyms
- List: Diplostoma bulbivorum Richardson, 1829; Diplostoma douglasii Richardson, 1829; Geomys bulbivorus Richardson, 1837; Ascomys bulbivorus Wagner, 1843; Pseudostoma bulbivorum Audubon & Bachmann, 1854; Geomys (Thomomys) bulbivorus Giebel, 1855; Thomomys bulbivora Brandt, 1855; Thomomys bulbivorus Baird, 1858; Thomomys (subgenus Megascapheus) bulbivorus Elliot, 1903

= Camas pocket gopher =

Small species of burrowing rodent from Oregon

The camas pocket gopher (Thomomys bulbivorus), also known as the camas rat or Willamette Valley gopher, is a rodent and the largest member in the genus Thomomys of the family Geomyidae. First described in 1829, it is endemic to the Willamette Valley of northwestern Oregon in the United States. The herbivorous gopher forages for vegetable and plant matter, which it collects in large, fur-lined, external cheek pouches. Surplus food is hoarded in an extensive system of tunnels. The dull-brown-to-lead-gray coat changes color and texture over the year. The mammal's characteristically large, protuberant incisors are well adapted for use in tunnel construction, particularly in the hard clay soils of the Willamette Valley. The gophers make chattering sounds with their teeth; males and females make purring (or crooning) sounds when they are together, and the young make twittering sounds. Born toothless, blind and hairless, the young grow rapidly before being weaned at about six weeks of age.

Although the camas pocket gopher is fiercely defensive when cornered, it may become tame in captivity. While population trends are generally stable, threats to the species' survival include urbanization, habitat conversion for agricultural use and active attempts at eradication with trapping and poisons. It is prey for raptors and carnivorous mammals, and host to several parasitic arthropods and worms. Scientists believe that the gopher's evolutionary history was disrupted when the Missoula Floods washed over the Willamette Valley at the end of the last ice age. The floods almost completely inundated its geographic range, which may have caused a genetic bottleneck of survivors that repopulated the region after the waters receded.

== Taxonomy ==
There are six genera of North American pocket gophers: Cratogeomys, Geomys, Orthogeomys, Pappogeomys, Thomomys, and Zygogeomys. The camas pocket gopher is a smooth-toothed pocket gopher of the genus Thomomys, within the pocket-gopher family Geomyidae. The incisors of gophers in the genus Thomomys have characteristically smooth anterior surfaces, while those of Geomys have two deep grooves per tooth and those of Cratogeomys have a single groove. The camas pocket gopher is a member of the subgenus Megascapheus, established in 1903, at that time for the camas pocket gopher alone. Taxonomists subsequently assigned other gophers to the same subgenus. The name Thomomys derives from the Greek σωρός (heap) + μῦς (mouse), probably describing the mounds of excavated soil produced by the burrowing gopher. Bulbus translates as "bulb" in Latin, and the word for "devour" is voro. Naturalist David Douglas reported that the gopher consumed bulbs of the camas lily, and Vernon Bailey later attributed the lack of camas lilies in areas inhabited by the gopher to the bulbs being eaten. However, naturalist H. M. Wight observed that the gopher ate primarily dandelion greens, and was skeptical that it was a large consumer of bulbs.

=== Early history ===
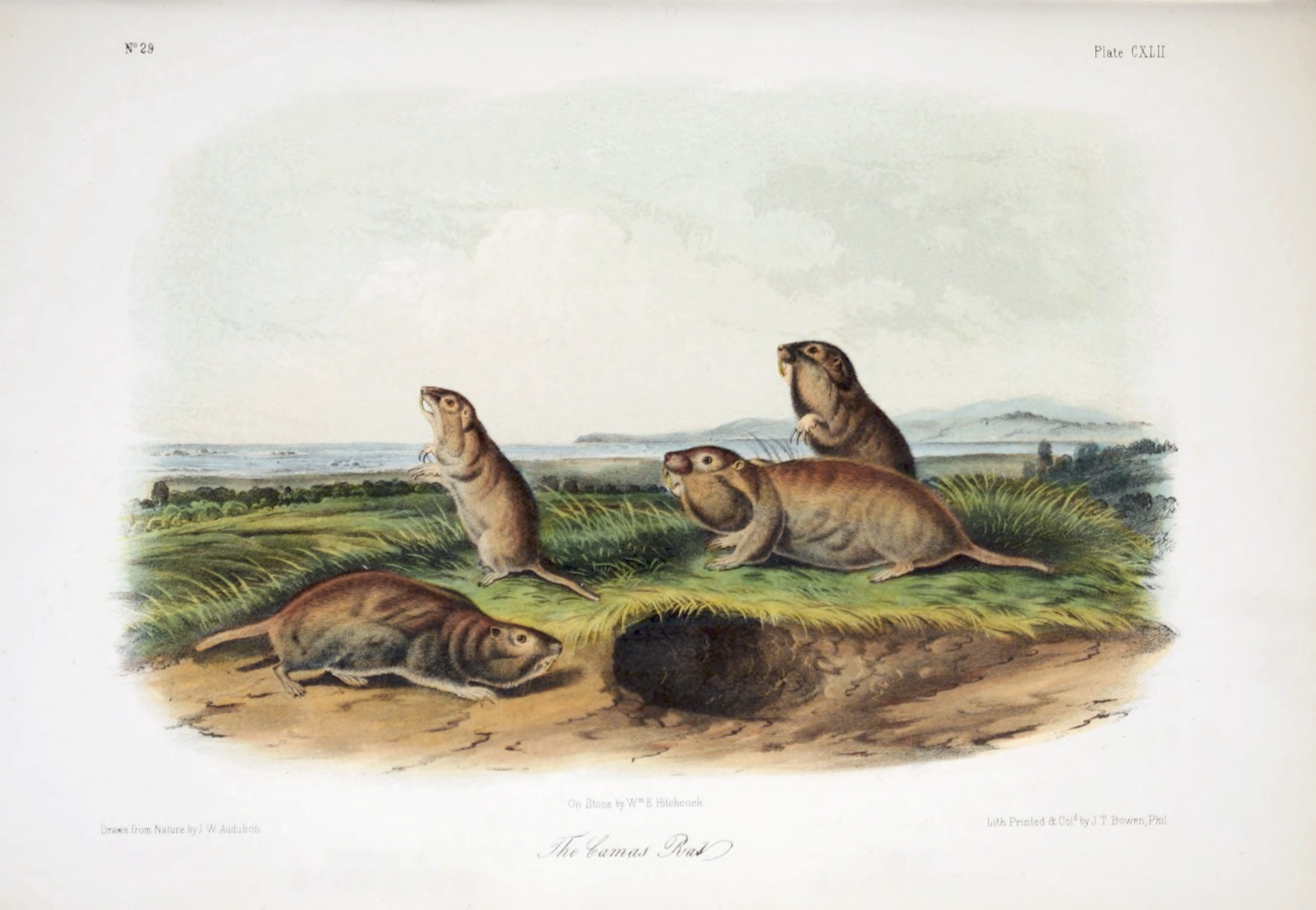
Nineteenth-century naturalists referred to a "camas rat", as in this James Audubon print.

The taxonomy of the camas pocket gopher and its genus, Thomomys, have a convoluted history. According to a review article published by the American Society of Mammalogists in 1987, Johann Friedrich von Brandt was the first to refer to the camas pocket gopher as Thomomys bulbivorus in an 1855 article published by the Imperial Academy of Sciences. In the 1855 article, Brandt refers to Tomomys bulbivora without the "h" and ending with an "a". He writes parenthetically "(man schreibe nicht Thomomys)". The authors of the 1987 review note that they did not see Brandt's actual article, but source the textbook The mammals of North America published in 1981.

Early confusion arose from writings by John Richardson between 1828 and 1839. Although he describes six species in the genus, according to later critics he was unfamiliar with all specimens. Richardson's descriptions of the animals and the figures in the text were also criticized. His 1829 Fauna boreali-americana describes a type specimen of camas pocket gopher obtained from the "banks of the Columbia River, Oregon", the northern limit of the gopher's geographic range. This was probably Portland, at the confluence of the Willamette and Columbia Rivers, the only place on the Columbia where subsequent specimens have been found. The present location of this initial specimen is uncertain; reportedly stored at the Hudson Bay Museum, it could not be located in 1915. When Richardson made his first examination, the specimen was apparently incomplete; although Joel Asaph Allen wrote in 1893 that it consisted only of the skin, Richardson described the skull and facial features in detail.

In Fauna boreali-americana, Richardson assigns the mammal to the now-defunct genus Diplostoma described by Rafinesque in 1817. He named it Diplostoma ? bulbivorum. Illustration-labeling errors in Richardson's book further confounded subsequent taxonomists; the plate was labeled Diplostoma douglasii.

There is a specimen of a quadruped in the Hudson's Bay Museum, which Mr David Douglas informs me is the animal known on the banks of the Columbia by the name of the camas-rat, because the bulbous root of the Quamash or Camas plant (Scilla esculenta) forms its favourite food. The scull is wanting, and the animal, therefore, cannot be with certainty referred to a genus, but the form of its exterior cheek-pouches leads me to think that it may belong to the diplostoma of M Rafinesque-Schmaltz.

— John Richardson, Fauna boreali-americana, 1829

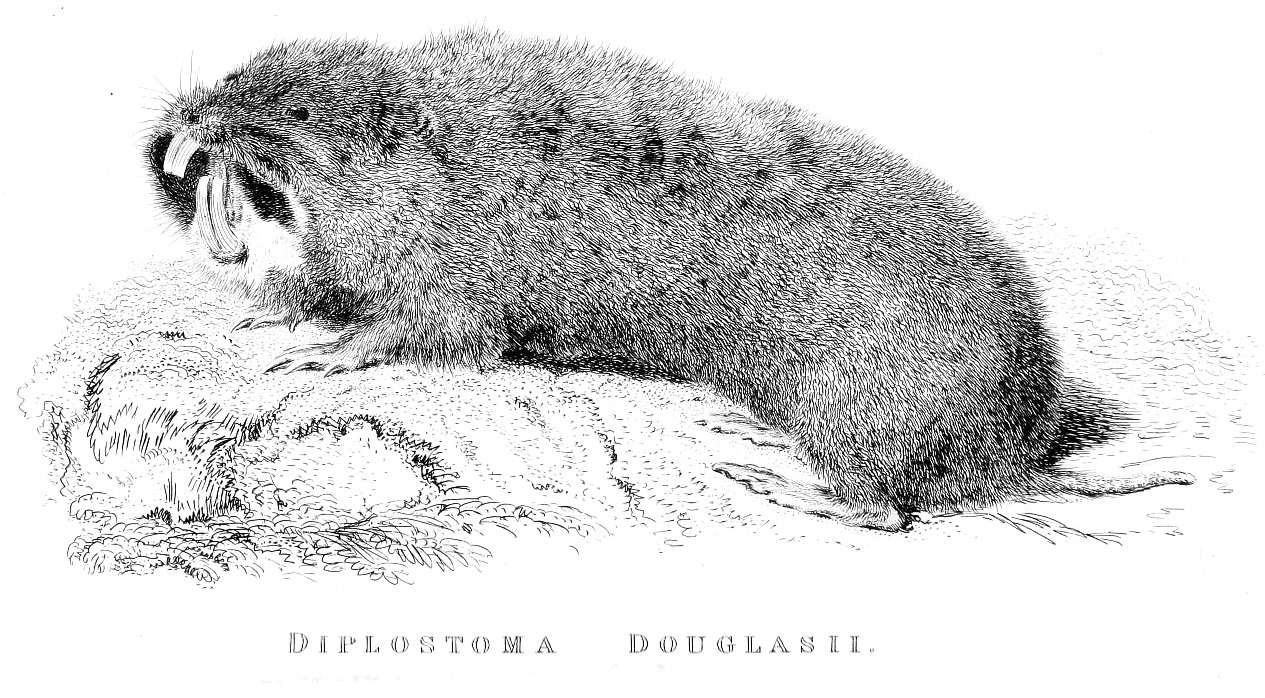
Diplostoma douglasii from Fauna boreali-americana, 1829

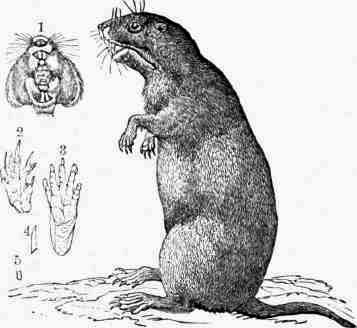
Woodcut from 1879 encyclopedia article

The confusion around the species' taxonomy and identification amplified when naturalist Spencer Fullerton Baird interpreted Richardson's reports. The camas pocket gopher's large size led Baird to conclude that the animal's measurements (reported by Richardson) were an artifact of its taxidermy preparation. Baird was also apparently in error about the location from which the specimen was taken, attributing the name Thomomys bulbivorus to a set of previously collected specimens later known as the California Gopher. This confusion was echoed by subsequent authors. The article on gophers in the 1879 edition of the American Cyclopædia has an illustration captioned "California Gopher (Thomomys bulbivorus)". The ninth edition of the Encyclopædia Britannica (published during the late 19th century) mistakenly reports Thomomys bulbivorus as abundant along the central California coast.

=== Clarifications ===
Although Baird and Elliott Coues were involved in early assessments of the genus, according to Allen neither ever saw a specimen of the camas pocket gopher (T. bulbivorus). Allen obtained and examined two large adults (male and female) collected in Beaverton, Oregon, in May 1890 which were considerably larger and darker than previously examined specimens. Skull features and white markings around the mouth and anus also differed. His findings and the specimen-collection location helped identify the camas pocket gopher as a species separate from California gophers. The California specimens were classified by Eydoux and Gervais as Oryctomys bottae, now known as Thomomys bottae (Botta's pocket gopher). They were found near Monterey, California, over 1,000 kilometers (620 miles) south of the now-recognized range of the Camas pocket gopher.

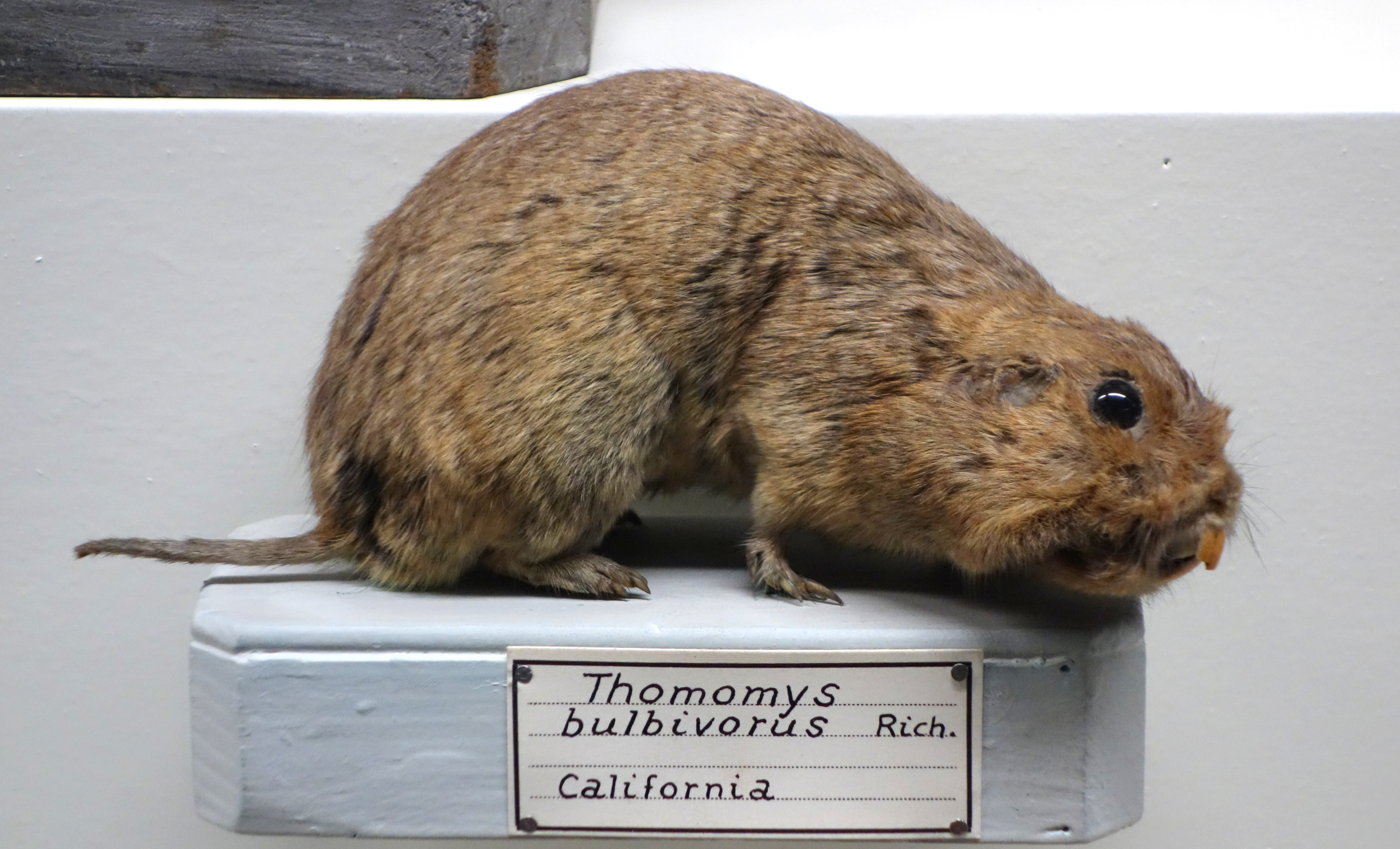
Taxidermied specimen in the Museo Civico di Storia Naturale di Genova, mislabeled "California"

The distribution of Elliot's "great pocket gopher" (as it was known) extended along the California coast "north of San Francisco." James Audubon and John Bachman reassessed the taxonomy on the camas pocket gopher in the late 1800s. They referred it as the "camas rat". They reclassified the gopher as Pseudostoma borealis. They rejected Diplostoma as a genus, and assigned Diplostoma bulbivorum as synonymous with P. borealis. They attributed any differences described by Richardson to artifact, from a specimen that was "twisted and disfigured" in preparation. Based on observations of taxidermy specimens in Europe, they suggested that Townsend's pocket gopher (Geomys (Thomomys) townsendii) belonged to the same species. In 1875, the camas pocket gopher was reported as a sub-species of the northern pocket gopher (Thomomys talpoides),. During the 1920s H. M. Wight referred to it colloquially as the "Willamette Valley gopher".

=== Current phylogeny ===
In 2008, a team of biologists from the University of California, Berkeley and Harvard University published multilocus phylogenetic analysis results of the genus Thomomys. The camas pocket gopher was found to be well separated from other taxa in the subgenus Megascapheus. These findings suggested that the camas pocket gopher was a sister to the other taxa in the subgenus, but the relationships between those other animals was less clear. Only one camas pocket gopher was included in this study, which limited the ability to distinguish features such as monophyly. The following cladogram was presented showing the placement of the camas pocket gopher among its closest relatives:

- Thomomys
  - Thomomys
    - Mazama pocket gopher (Thomomys mazama)
    - - Idaho pocket gopher (Thomomys idahoensis)
      - Mountain pocket gopher (Thomomys monticola)
      - Northern pocket gopher (Thomomys talpoides)
  - Megascapheus
    - Camas pocket gopher (Thomomys bulbivorus)
    - - Southern pocket gopher (Thomomys umbrinus)
      - - Townsend's pocket gopher (Thomomys townsendii)
        - Botta's pocket gopher (Thomomys bottae)

Patterns of genetic variation in the camas pocket gopher have been studied. Although there are no subspecies, there is substantial genetic diversity within the species. Its genetic patterns are consistent with limited inbreeding within specific populations. This is similar to patterns described in Botta's pocket gopher and the southern pocket gopher, both of which are members of the same genus. However, it contrasts with patterns noted in Baird's pocket gopher and the plains pocket gopher, members of a separate genus, Geomys, which showed a higher degree of inbreeding.

The species' genetic diversity is similar to that of other pocket gophers occupying a larger geographic range and diversity of habitat. Compared to Townsend's pocket gopher, which is distributed across a much larger area, but less diverse habitat, it is more genetically heterogeneous. Although there is considerable differentiation between separate populations of camas pocket gophers, their genetic variability does not affect the mammal's appearance. Study of the effects of genetic change over time revealed a pattern affected by a cataclysmic event across the species' entire geographic area about 13,000 years ago. Such an event would cause a population bottleneck, leading to scattered, isolated populations.

== Description ==
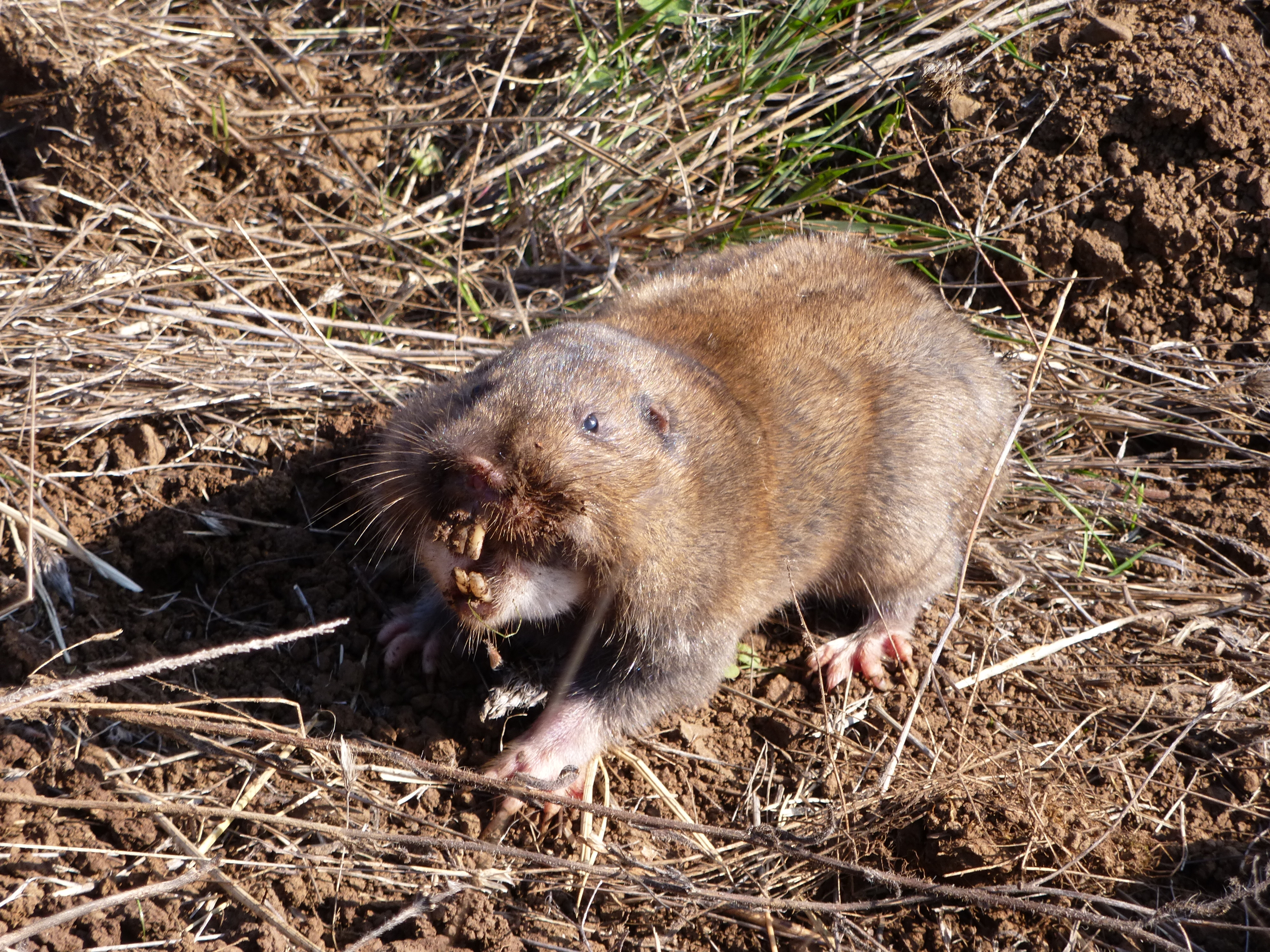
Camas pocket gopher at habitat-restoration site

The camas pocket gopher is, by a small margin, the largest member of its genus (Thomomys). The fur is a dull brown above and dark, leaden gray beneath. There are often patches of white on the chin, throat and around the anus, and it has blackish ear and nose markings. The external ear is a thickened rim of tissue. During the summer, the gopher's coat is short and coarse; winter pelage is longer and furrier. The coat of the young is similar to the adult summer coat, but with more sparsely distributed fur; the abdominal skin may be visible.

Like other gophers, it has small eyes and ears and a nearly hairless tail. Its shoulders are broader than its hips. It is pentadactyl, with five claws on each foot. The claws on its forefeet are longer than those on its hind feet, and its middle claws are longest. The front claws of the camas pocket gopher are short and weak relative to its size. It employs plantigrade locomotion. The male is larger than the female, measuring an average 300 mm (12 in) in length. A large male weighs about 500 g (18 oz). One male specimen was 321 mm (12.6 in) long and weighed 633.8 g (22.36 oz). Females are about 271 mm (10.7 in) long. The tail measures 90 mm (3.5 in) in the male and 81 mm (3.2 in) in the female. An adult male's hind feet measure 40–43 mm (1.6–1.7 in), and an average female's hind feet measure 39 mm (1.5 in). There are four mammary glands: two in the inguinal region and two in the pectoral region, each supplying a pair of nipples. Morphologically, it most closely resembles Botta's pocket gopher; differentiation can be made based on the concavity of the inner surface of the pterygoids, small claws, more uniform fur coloring and exoccipital groove of the camas pocket gopher.

=== Skull and dentition ===
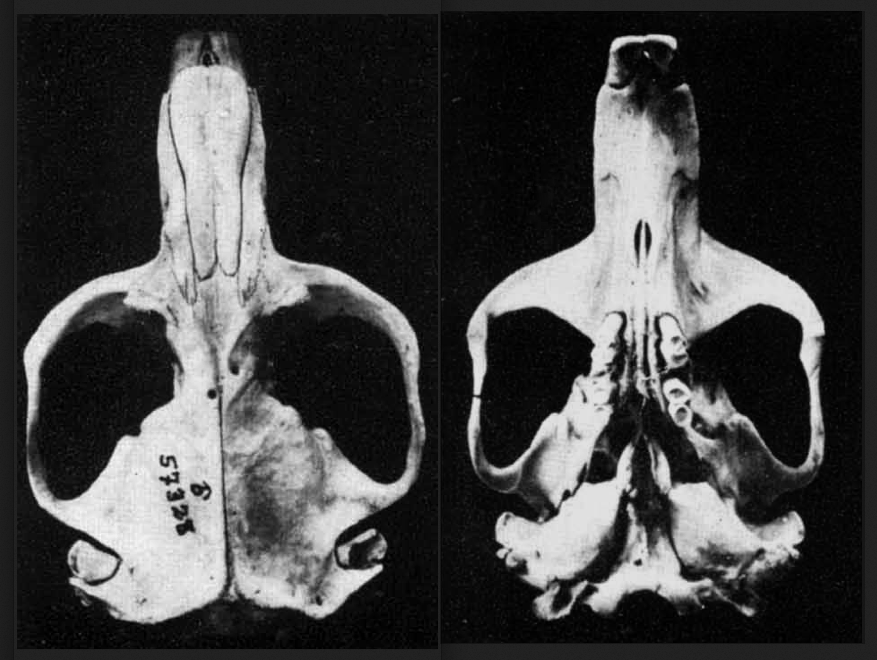
Camas pocket gopher skull (Bailey, 1915)

The skull of the camas pocket gopher is sturdily proportioned. The camas pocket gopher and other smooth-toothed pocket gophers with robust snouts are included in the subgenus Megascapheus. Male skulls measure 52 mm (2.0 in) in length across the base and 57 mm (2.2 in) if the incisors are included. The short, wide skull has a relatively short nasal passage. In width, the skull measures 19 mm (0.75 in) across the nasal passages, 30.5 mm (1.20 in) across the mastoids and 36.5 mm (1.44 in) at the zygomatic arches. The external auditory meatus is broad and open, although the auditory bullae are confined.

The dentition of the camas pocket gopher is symmetric, with one set of incisors, one set of premolars, and three sets of molars above and below. This gives a dental formula of 1.0.1.31.0.1.3, for a total of 20 teeth. The slender incisors are prominent and distinctive, smooth with yellow surface enamel and white tips due to soil abrasion. These distinctive, large, protuberant upper incisors give the gopher a buck-toothed appearance. The lips do not cover the incisors, but close behind them. There are faintly visible grooves on the inner aspect of the upper incisors, which are more pronounced in other members of the genus (such as the Mazama pocket gopher, T. mazama). The upper molars have an alveolar length of 10 mm (0.39 in).

=== Cheek pouches ===
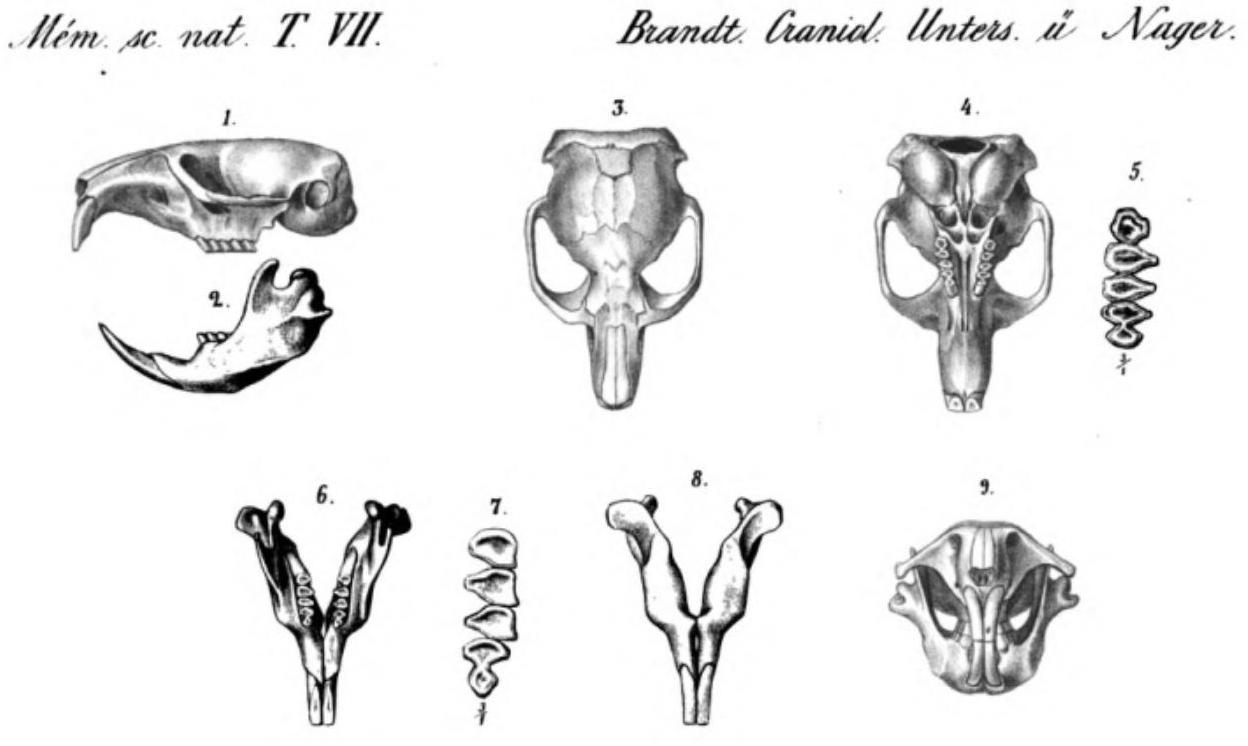
Additional views of the skull and dentition (Brandt, 1855)

Gophers are burrowing rodents of the family Geomyidae, characterized by fur-lined, external cheek pouches used to gather and transport food. The cheek pouches of geomyids such as the camas pocket gopher are controlled by a set of muscles, with a sphincter controlling the opening and closing of the pouch. A pair of muscles attached to the premaxilla pull the pouches forward, and paired retractor muscles pull the pouches back. These retractor muscles extend back and up from the cheek surfaces, forming a band 7–10 cm (2.8–3.9 in) long and about 2 cm (0.79 in) wide attached to aponeurosis of the latissimus dorsi muscle.

=== Male genitalia ===
Like many mammals, the penis of the camas pocket gopher contains a bone, the baculum. Although its baculum was initially reported as smaller than that of other gophers—1.5 mm (0.059 in) high, 1.8 mm (0.071 in) wide at the base and 8.5 mm (0.33 in) long—the examiner did not know if the specimen had reached full maturity. Subsequent reports averaged about 2.1 mm (0.083 in) high, 2.2 mm (0.087 in) wide at the base and 10.1 mm (0.40 in) long. The phallus' total length averaged 13.5 mm (0.53 in), with the glans covering more than half its length.

== Distribution and habitat ==
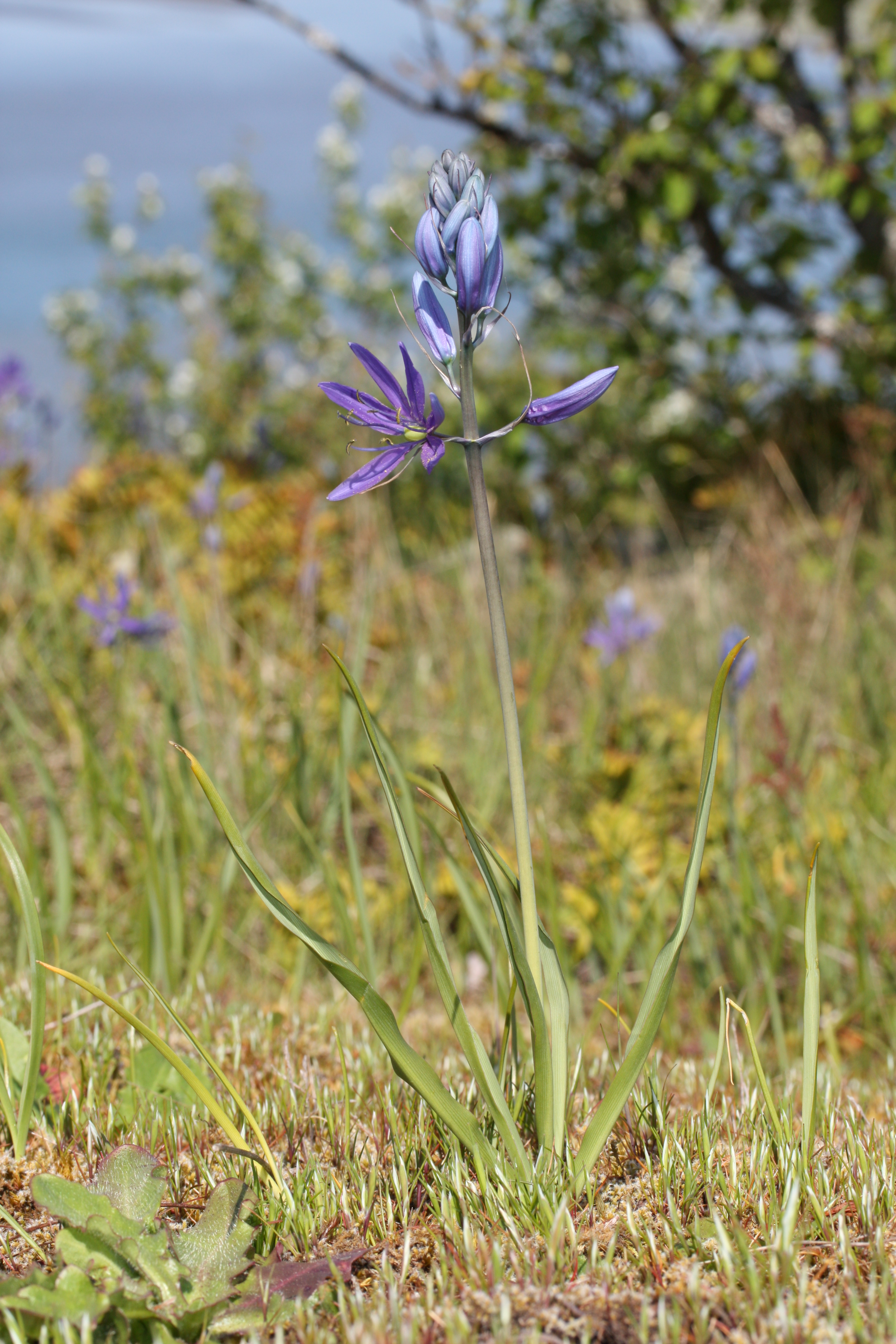
Some argued that the camas pocket gopher consumed bulbs of the camas flower.

The camas pocket gopher is found in the Willamette Valley and the drainage areas of the Yamhill River and other tributaries of the Willamette River. Its range extends north from Eugene to Portland and Forest Grove and west to Grand Ronde. A 1920 report of a Pleistocene fossil in Fort Rock, Oregon has been questioned, since it is far outside the species' current geographic range; as of 1987, the specimen could not be located for further evaluation.

The clay-rich Willamette Valley soils are hard in the dry season, and the gopher's protuberant incisors are well adapted to these conditions. Adequate soil drainage and suitable plant food are essential components of the gopher's ideal habitat. Not typically found in wetland areas (where its tunnels would flood), the species is found in seral communities of grasses and shrubs. They are also established in agricultural fields in the Willamette Valley, including fields of alfalfa, wheat and oats. The species has also been found in areas of ecological disturbance with similar terrain features.

On a geologic timescale, the Willamette Valley has been the site of massive floods. During the late Wisconsin glaciation, a series of floods (known as the Missoula or Bretz Floods) occurred. The last flood in the series, a massive flood with an estimated 1,693 km^{3} (406 cu mi) of water flowing at a rate of 42 km^{3} per hour (412 million ft^{3} per second) over a 40-hour period, occurred about 13,000 years ago. The flood filled the Willamette Valley to a depth of about 122 m (400 ft), in a near-perfect overlay of the camas pocket gopher's range. Although the species has been collected above this elevation, such finds are uncommon. A temporary lake, Lake Allison, formed. Although it is assumed that the gopher lived in the valley before the flood, no fossils have been recovered. The Chehalem Mountains, with a peak elevation of 497 m (1,631 ft), probably provided refuge for survivor populations and survivors would have repopulated in isolated pockets when the waters receded. Before and since the floods, the mountains are thought to have limited gene flow between populations. The relatively narrow, sluggish Willamette River does not appear to obstruct genetic flow in gopher populations.

== Behavior ==
The gopher has been credited with being one of the most vicious animals known for its size. It has a great deal of courage and fights a man savagely until an opportunity for escape is offered, then it turns and runs as rapidly as possible, attempting to hide from its pursuer.

— H. M. Wight, Economic Entomology: Pamphlets, 1918

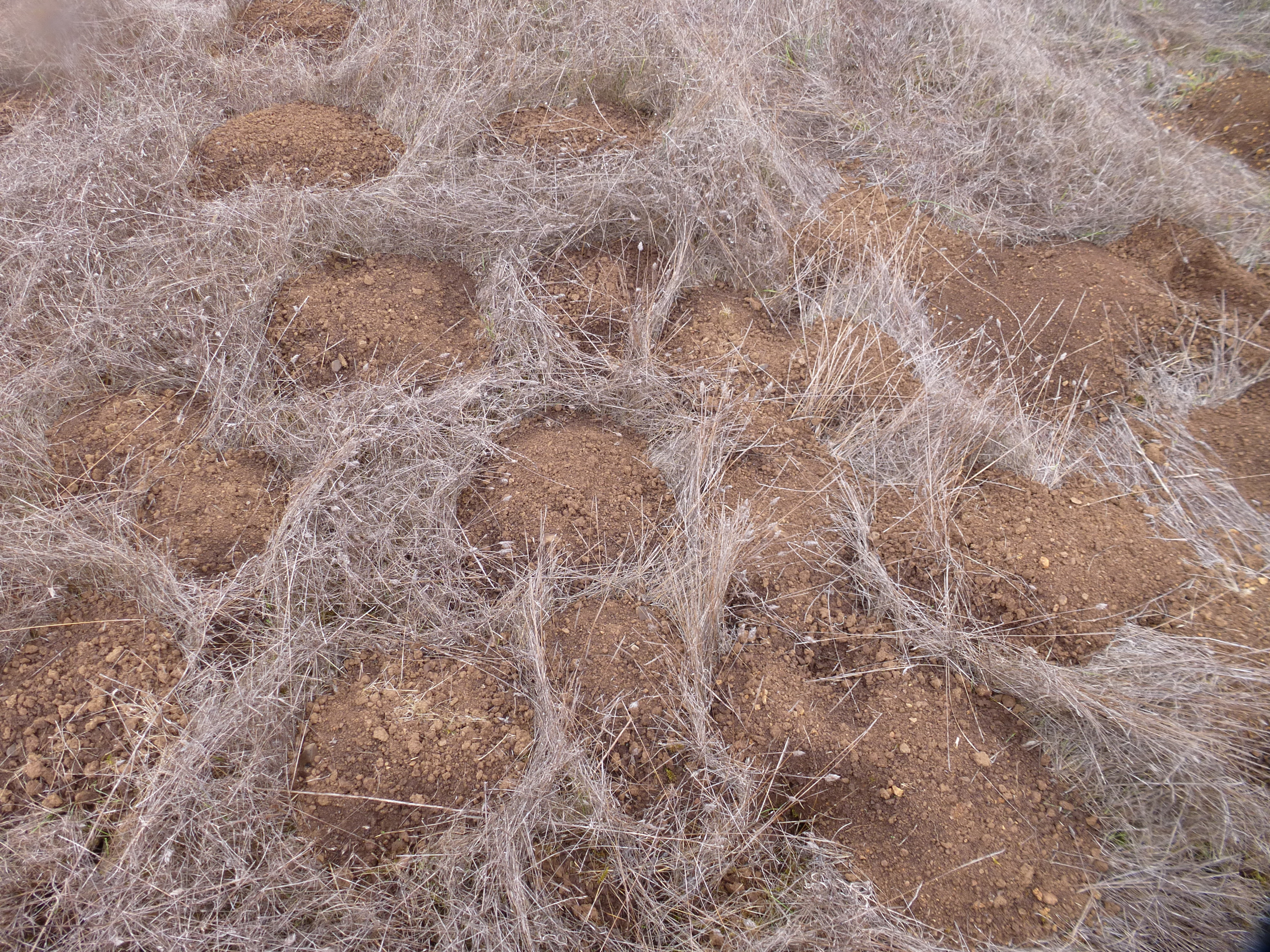
Camas pocket gopher mounds

The camas pocket gopher is a mostly solitary herbivore which is active throughout the year and does not hibernate. The gopher spends most of its time excavating tunnels in search of food, and the hard clay soils of the Willamette Valley pose a challenge. Although the gopher's front claws are too weak to dig through the clay (particularly during dry seasons), its large incisors and strongly protuberant orientation are well-adapted for this purpose. Tunnel systems constructed by the camas pocket gopher can be complex, with some tunnels exceeding 240 m (260 yd) in length. About 90 mm (3.5 in) in diameter, the tunnels are up to 0.91 m (3.0 ft) deep. When soils are damp the gopher constructs ventilation ducts or chimney mounds (possibly unique to the species), to increase ventilation. The chimney mounds rise vertically 15–25 cm (6–10 in), are open at the top and are thought to ventilate the burrows in accordance with Bernoulli's principle. It is not known if adjacent gopher burrowing systems interconnect. Reports differ about whether or not the ranges of the camas pocket gopher and the Mazama pocket gopher overlap; if so, this refutes the previous belief that Oregon gopher ranges do not overlap.

Camas pocket gopher burrow

Although the species is primarily fossorial, it occasionally gathers food near the entrance of a tunnel. Dandelions seem to be its favorite food, and are also used as nesting material. During breeding season males will enter the tunnels of females, and males and females may make purring (or cooing) sounds when they are together. Mothers seem to comfort the young by softly vocalizing, with the young twittering in response.

The camas pocket gopher may behave aggressively when on the defensive, with mammalogist Vernon Orlando Bailey describing the species as "morose and savage." However, it may be easily tamed in captivity; the female is more readily tamed than the male. Another small rodent endemic to the Willamette Valley, the gray-tailed vole (Microtus canicaudus), also uses camas pocket gopher tunnels. Other mammals sharing the range of the camas pocket gopher (and, possibly, its tunnels) include the vagrant shrew, Townsend's mole, the brush rabbit, the eastern cottontail rabbit, Townsend's chipmunk, the California ground squirrel, the dusky-footed woodrat, the North American deermouse, the creeping vole, Townsend's vole, the Pacific jumping mouse, the long-tailed weasel and the striped skunk.

== Ecology ==
Growth and development
Age (weeks)	Weight	Length	Description
Birth	6.1 g (0.22 oz)	50 mm (2.0 in)	No hair, no teeth, no cheek pouches
2	23 g (0.81 oz)	90 mm (3.5 in)	Developing hair
3	35.5 g (1.25 oz)	108 mm (4.3 in)	Crawling, eat solid food
4	53.6 g (1.89 oz)	123.5 mm (4.86 in)	Pockets developed
5	70.5 g (2.49 oz)	153 mm (6.0 in)	Eyes open
6	86 g (3.0 oz)	164 mm (6.5 in)	Weaned

Varying onset times and duration of the camas pocket gopher breeding season have been reported. Early reports suggested an early-April onset, with the season extending through June. Other reports cited "evidently pregnant" females seen in late March. In heavily irrigated areas the breeding season may be longer, extending into early September. About four young are born in a litter, although litters as large as nine have been reported. The blind, hairless, toothless offspring weigh about 6.1 g (0.22 oz) and are 50 mm (2.0 in) in length. During their first six weeks they will begin to crawl, develop cheek pouches, open their eyes and wean from milk to solid food. The young then weigh about 86 g (3.0 oz) and measure 164 mm (6.5 in) in length. At weeks 8, 10 and 17 they will weigh 101 g (3.6 oz), 160 g (5.6 oz) and 167 g (5.9 oz). Some reports indicate that more than one litter may be born in a season. Sexual maturity probably develops by the following year's breeding season. Although males are fully grown by that time, females may continue to increase in size.

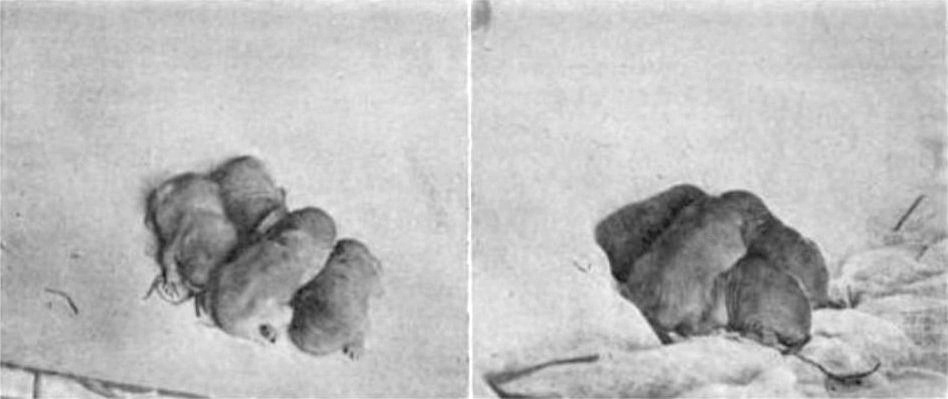
Ten-day-old camas pocket gopher pups

There was little data as of 1998 on the longevity and mortality of the camas pocket gopher. It is presumably prey for carnivorous mammals, and its bones have been identified in regurgitated pellets of raptors such as the great horned owl. Parasites include mites, lice, fleas, roundworms and flatworms. The species' tougher skin may protect it from some fleas known to infest Botta's pocket gopher and the Mazama pocket gopher. Mites known to parasitize the camas pocket gopher include Androlaelaps geomys and Echinonyssus femuralis. Some authorities report Androlaelaps fahrenholzi as another parasitic mite, but a later publication did not report it. The chewing louse Geomydoecus oregonus has also been reported.

Two parasitic worms first discovered in the gastrointestinal tract of camas pocket gophers are the nematode Heligmosomoides thomomyos and the cestode Hymenolepis tualatinensis. Other worms include two nematodes and the cestode Hymenolepis horrida.

== Human interactions ==
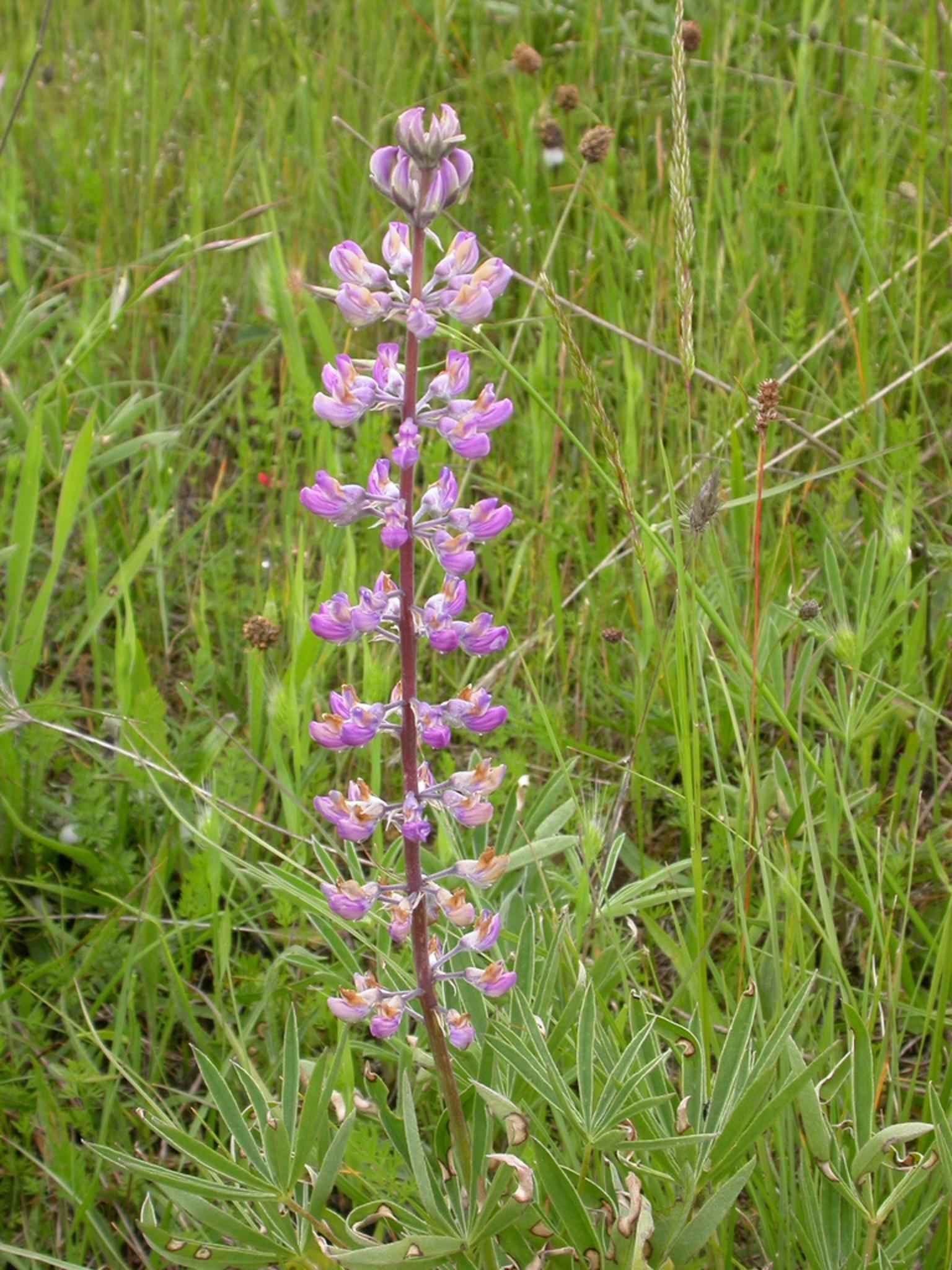
Camas pocket gopher relocation may protect threatened species of flora, such as Kincaid's lupine.

Camas pocket gophers cause significant economic losses, so may be treated as an agricultural pest. Crops damaged include clover, alfalfa and vetch. The gophers may eat these crops or damage the roots while burrowing. This can injure the roots and expose them to air, causing them to dry out. Subterranean activity can also damage the roots of fruit trees. Root crops are particularly susceptible to damage and consumption; potatoes, carrots, parsnips and other crops may be eaten on site or dragged off by the gopher for caching in the burrow. Excavated soil can cover grass and limit livestock grazing; freshly sprouted grains may be similarly damaged. An estimate of impact from camas pocket gopher activities in the Willamette Valley in 1918 amounted to $1.5 million annual losses. Gopher activities can provide a benefit of soil aeration, enhancing water retention after rain or snowmelt. Buried vegetation can also compost, enhancing organic soil content to provide additional benefits.

Proposed methods for controlling gopher populations in agricultural areas include poisoning dandelions, clover, carrots, sweet potatoes and parsnips. Camas pocket gophers are larger than other gophers, so conventional gopher traps may fail to capture them. Toxic baits and fumigants may also fail, since the gophers will sometimes wall off a segment of the burrow. Gophers may also cause local flooding if their tunneling activities damage levees.

In an effort to mitigate damage by camas pocket gophers to sensitive habitat, the Oregon Department of Transportation and the Institute for Applied Ecology trap and relocate the animals. At a site south of Philomath, Oregon, the IAE is working to protect a small but viable population of Kincaid's lupine (Lupinus sulphureus). This threatened flower is the primary host plant for the endangered Fender's blue butterfly (Icaricia icarioides fenderi), which is endemic to the Willamette Valley. The gophers are relocated to a nearby location distant from the lupines.

=== Conservation status ===
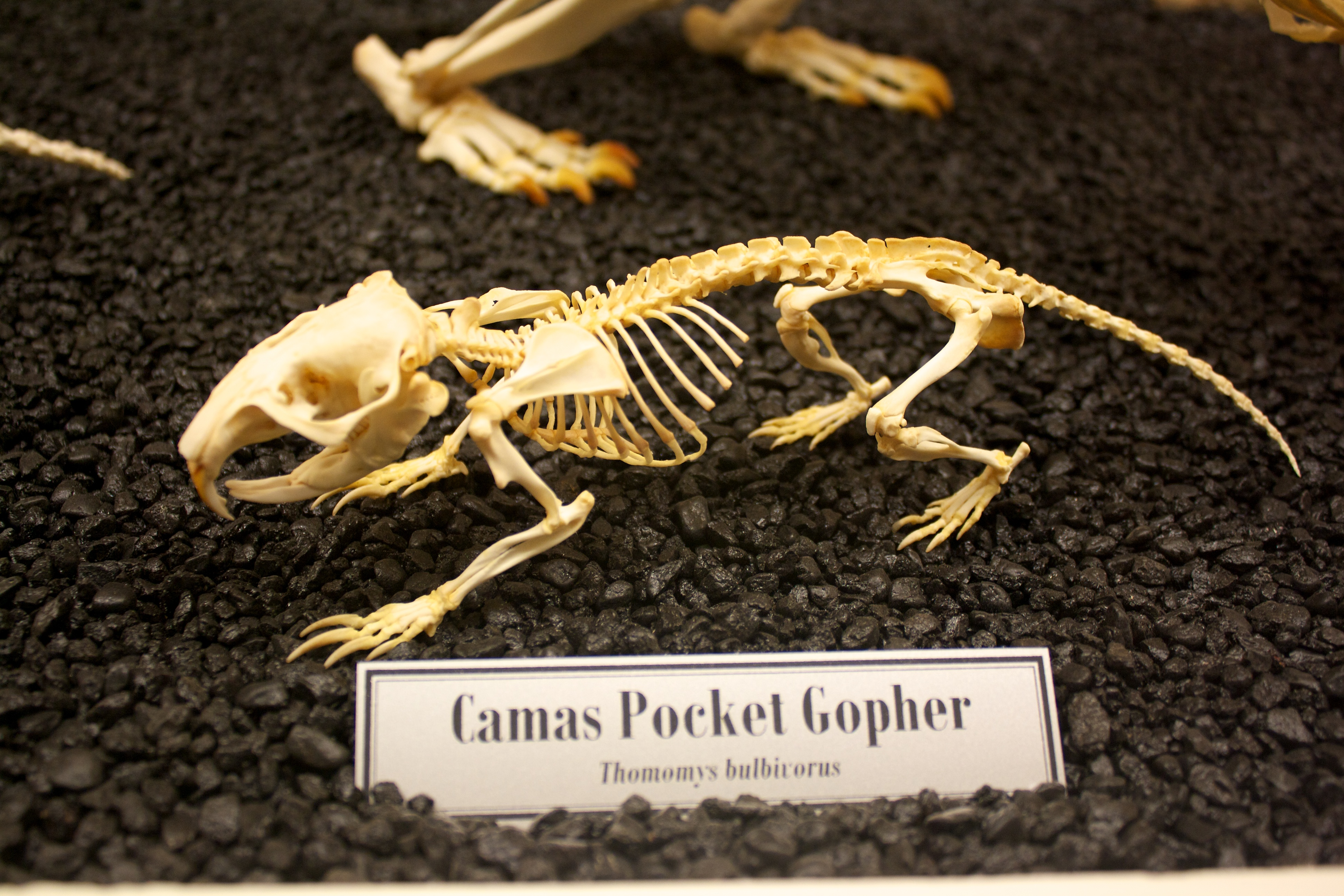
Skeleton at the Museum of Osteology in Oklahoma

Citing concerns of urbanization, habitat loss and active attempts at eradication, NatureServe assessed in 2014 the camas pocket gophers' conservation status as vulnerable. The conservation status of the camas pocket gopher is classified as "least concern" by the IUCN (International Union for Conservation of Nature) Species Programme, with a stable population trend. The IUCN notes that the gopher is common in its range; studies indicate that populations can recover rapidly after traps are removed from an area, and the species may adapt well to environmental changes.

The IUCN and others express concern about degradation of the species' habitat due to urbanization and agricultural expansion. The total area occupied by the camas pocket gopher is less than 20,000 km^{2} (7,700 sq mi). This area, the Willamette Valley, contains 70 percent of Oregon's human population. Although this range probably contains a few protected areas, many preserves in the valley are primarily waterfowl protection for hunters. Wetland areas are not suited to the camas pocket gopher, since tunnels are flood-prone. In areas better suited to the gopher (disturbed habitats and pastoral farmland), it may be considered a pest and subject to eradication by poisoning and trapping.
