= List of mammals of Nevada =

This list of mammals of Nevada includes mammal species living in the U.S. state of Nevada. It also includes species that are now extirpated from the state.

== Order: Eulipotyphla ==
=== Shrews ===
Family: Soricidae

- Desert shrew (Notiosorex crawford)
- Merriam's shrew (Sorex merriami)
- Montane shrew (Sorex monticolus)
- American water shrew (Sorex palustris)
- Preble's shrew (Sorex preblei)
- Inyo shrew (Sorex tenellus)
- Trowbridge's shrew (Sorex trowbridgii)
- Vagrant shrew (Sorex vagrans)

=== Moles ===
Family: Talpidae

- Broad-footed mole, (Scapanus latimanus)

== Order: Chiroptera (bats) ==
=== Vesper bats ===
Family: Vespertilionidae

- Hoary bat (Aeorestes cinereus)
- Pallid bat (Antrozous pallidus)
- Townsend's big-eared bat (Corynorhinus townsendii)
- Big brown bat (Eptesicus fuscus)
- Spotted bat (Euderma maculatum)
- Allen's big-eared bat (Idionycteris phyllotis)
- Silver-haired bat (Lasionycteris noctivagans)
- Western red bat (Lasiurus blossevillii)
- Western yellow bat (Lasiurus xanthinus)
- Southwestern myotis (Myotis auriculus)
- California myotis (Myotis californicus)
- Western small-footed myotis (Myotis ciliolabrum)
- Long-eared myotis (Myotis evotis)
- Little brown bat (Myotis lucifugus)
- Fringed myotis (Myotis thysanodes)
- Long-legged myotis (Myotis yumanensis)
- Canyon bat (Parastrellus hesperus)

=== Free-tailed bats ===
Family: Molossidae

- Western mastiff bat (Eumops perotis)
- Mexican free-tailed bat (Tadarida brasiliensis)

=== Leaf-nosed bats ===
Family: Phyllostomidae

- Mexican long-tongued bat (Choeronycteris mexicana)
- California leaf-nosed bat (Macrotus californicus)

== Order: Lagomorpha (lagomorphs) ==
=== Rabbits and hares ===
Family: Leporidae

- Pygmy rabbit (Brachylagus idahoensis)
- Snowshoe hare (Lepus americanus)
- Black-tailed jackrabbit (Lepus californicus)
- White-tailed jackrabbit (Lepus townsendii)
- Audubon's cottontail (Sylvilagus audobonii)
- Mountain cottontail (Sylvilagus nuttallii)

=== Pikas ===
Family: Ochotonidae

- American pika (Ochotona princeps)

== Order: Rodentia (rodents) ==
=== Squirrels ===
Family: Sciuridae

- White-tailed antelope squirrel (Ammospermophilus leucurus)
- Northern flying squirrel (Gluacomys sabrinus)
- Yellow-bellied marmot (Marmota flaviventris)
- Alpine chipmunk (Neotamias alpinus)
- Yellow-pine chipmunk (Neotamias amoenus)
- Cliff chipmunk (Neotamias dorsalis)
- Merriam's chipmunk (Neotamias merriami)
- Least chipmunk (Neotamias minimus)
- Yellow-cheeked chipmunk (Neotamias ochrogenys)
- Panamint chipmunk (Neotamias panamintinus)
- Long-eared chipmunk (Neotamias quadrimaculatus)
- Allen's chipmunk (Neotamias senex)
- Lodgepole chipmunk (Neotamias speciosus)
- Uinta chipmunk (Neotamias umbrinus)
- Western gray squirrel (Sciurus griseus)
- California ground squirrel (Spermophilus beecheyi)
- Belding's ground squirrel (Spermophilus beldingi)
- Golden-mantled ground squirrel (Spermophilus lateralis)
- Mohave ground squirrel (Spermophilus mohavensis)
- Round-tailed ground squirrel (Spermophilus tereticaudus)
- Townsend's ground squirrel (Spermophilus townsendii)
- Rock squirrel (Spermophilus variegatus)
- Douglas squirrel (Tamiasciurus douglasii)
- Merriam's ground squirrel (Urocitellus canus)

=== Mountain beavers ===
Family: Aplodontiidae

- Mountain beaver (Aplodontia rufa)

=== Pocket gophers ===
Family: Geomyidae

- Botta's pocket gopher (Thomomys bottae) possibly extirpated
- Mountain pocket gopher (Thomomys monticola)
- Northern pocket gopher (Thomomys talpoides)
- Townsend's pocket gopher (Thomomys townsendii)

=== Kangaroo rats and pocket mice ===
Family: Heteromyidae

- Long-tailed pocket mouse (Chaetodipus formosus)
- Desert pocket mouse (Chaetodipus penicillatus)
- Spiny pocket mouse (Chaetodipus spinatus)
- Merriam's kangaroo rat (Dipodomys merriami)
- Chisel-toothed kangaroo rat (Dipodomys microps)
- Ord's kangaroo rat (Dipodomys ordii)
- Panamint kangaroo rat (Dipodomys panamintinus)
- Dark kangaroo mouse (Microdipodops megacephalus)
- Pale kangaroo mouse (Microdipodops pallidus)
- Little pocket mouse (Perognathus longimembris)
- Great Basin pocket mouse (Perognathus parvus)

=== Beavers ===
Family: Castoridae

- North American beaver (Castor canadensis)

=== Jumping mice ===
Family: Dipodidae

- Western jumping mouse (Zapus princeps)

=== New World mice, rats, and voles ===
Family: Cricetidae

- Sagebrush vole (Lemmiscus curtatus)
- Long-tailed vole (Microtus longicaudus)
- Montane vole (Microtus montanus)
- Bushy-tailed woodrat (Neotoma cinerea)
- Desert woodrat (Neotoma lepida)
- Muskrat (Ondatra zibethicus)
- Northern grasshopper mouse (Onychomys leucogaster)
- Southern grasshopper mouse (Onychomys torridus)
- Brush mouse (Peromyscus boylii)
- Canyon mouse (Peromyscus crinitus)
- Cactus mouse (Peromyscus eremicus)
- Gambel's deer mouse, (Peromyscus gambelii)
- Western deer mouse, (Peromyscus sonoriensis)
- Pinyon mouse (Peromyscus truei)
- Western harvest mouse (Reithrodontomys megalotus)
- Arizona cotton rat (Sigmodon arizonae) extirpated

=== Old World mice and rats ===
Family: Muridae

- House mouse (Mus musculus) introduced
- Brown rat (Rattus norvegicus) introduced
- Black rat (Rattus rattus) introduced

=== Porcupines ===
Family: Erethizontidae

- North American porcupine (Erethizon dorsatum)

== Order: Carnivora (carnivorans) ==
=== Canids ===
Family: Canidae

- Coyote (Canis latrans)
- Gray wolf (Canis lupus) extirpated, vagrant
  - Northwestern wolf (C. l .occidentalis) vagrant
  - Cascade Mountains wolf (C. l. fuscus) extirpated
  - †Southern Rocky Mountain wolf (C. l. youngi) extinct
- Gray fox (Urocyon cinereoargenteus)
- Kit fox (Vulpes macrotis)
- Red fox (Vulpes vulpes)
  - Sierra Nevada red fox (V. v. necator)

=== Bears ===
Family: Ursidae

- American black bear (Ursus americanus)
- Brown bear (Ursus arctos) extirpated
  - Grizzly bear (U. a. horribilis) extirpated

=== Procyonids ===
Family: Procyonidae

- Ringtail (Bassariscus astutus)
- Raccoon (Procyon lotor)

=== Mustelids ===
Family: Mustelidae

- Wolverine (Gulo gulo) extirpated
- North American river otter (Lontra canadensis)
- Pacific marten (Martes caurina)
- American ermine (Mustela richardsonii)
- Long-tailed weasel (Neogale frenata)
- American mink (Neogale vison)
- American badger (Taxidea taxus)

=== Skunks ===
Family: Mephitidae

- Striped skunk (Mephitis mephitis)
- Western spotted skunk (Spilogale gracilis)

=== Cats ===
Family: Felidae

- Canada lynx (Lynx canadensis) extirpated
- Bobcat (Lynx rufus)
- Cougar (Puma concolor)

== Order: Artiodactyla (even-toed ungulates) ==
=== Deer ===
Family: Cervidae

- Moose (Alces alces)
- Elk (Cervus canadensis)
  - Rocky Mountain elk (C. c. nelsoni)
- Mule deer (Odocoileus hemionus)
- White-tailed deer (Odocoileus virginianus)

=== Bovids ===
Family: Bovidae

- American bison (Bison bison) extirpated
- Mountain goat (Oreamnos americanus) introduced
- Bighorn sheep (Ovis canadensis)
  - Desert bighorn (O. c. nelsoni)

=== Pronghorns ===
Family: Antilocapridae

- Pronghorn (Antilocapra americana)

== See also ==
- Lists of mammals by region
- List of U.S. state mammals
