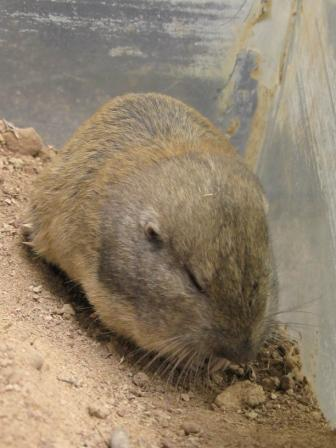

Conservation status
- Least Concern (IUCN 3.1)

Scientific classification
- Kingdom: Animalia
- Phylum: Chordata
- Class: Mammalia
- Order: Rodentia
- Family: Geomyidae
- Genus: Thomomys
- Species: T. clusius

Binomial name
- Thomomys clusius Coues, 1875

Synonyms
- Thomomys talpoides clusius

= Wyoming pocket gopher =

Species of mammal

The Wyoming pocket gopher (Thomomys clusius) is a species of gopher that is endemic to the United States. Between 1915 and 1979, it was generally considered to be a subspecies of the northern pocket gopher.

== Description ==
The Wyoming pocket gopher is the smallest species of the genus Thomomys, with a total length of about 17 cm (6.7 in), including a tail about 6 cm (2.4 in) long. Adults weigh from 44 to 72 g (1.6 to 2.5 oz). The fur is a pale yellowish-grey across the upper parts of the body and most of the head, and white on the underparts, feet, and tail. The snout is near black in color. It can be distinguished from the closely related northern pocket gopher by the lack of dark patches on its ears, as well as by its smaller size.

Like other gophers, it has strong front limbs with digging claws, and small ears and eyes. The fur-lined cheek pouches are relatively large, reaching about 44 mm (1.7 in) back from the snout.

== Distribution and habitat ==
The Wyoming pocket gopher is found only in a relatively limited area of southern Wyoming, in eastern Sweetwater County and southwestern Carbon County. It inhabits relatively flat, well-drained areas, often in association with greasewood (Sarcobatus spp.) and Gardner's saltbush (Atriplex gardneri).

== Biology and behavior ==
In most respects, the Wyoming pocket gopher is thought to be similar in habits and biology to the northern pocket gopher, of which it was formerly considered a subspecies. It is thought to be solitary, living in burrows that are significantly narrower than those of the northern species. It was initially separated from the northern pocket gopher on the basis that it possesses a different karyotype of 2n=46, rather than 2n=48. There is no evidence that the two species are able to interbreed.
