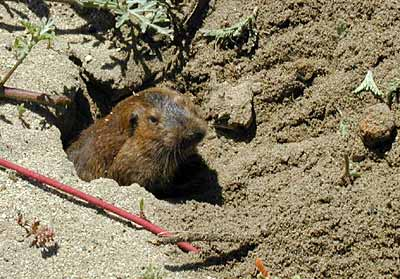
- Thomomys bottae

Scientific classification
- Kingdom: Animalia
- Phylum: Chordata
- Class: Mammalia
- Infraclass: Placentalia
- Order: Rodentia
- Family: Geomyidae
- Genus: Thomomys; Wied-Neuwied, 1839

Type species
- Thomomys rufescens Wied-Neuwied, 1839 (= T. talpoides rufescens)

Species
- 12 recognized species, see article.
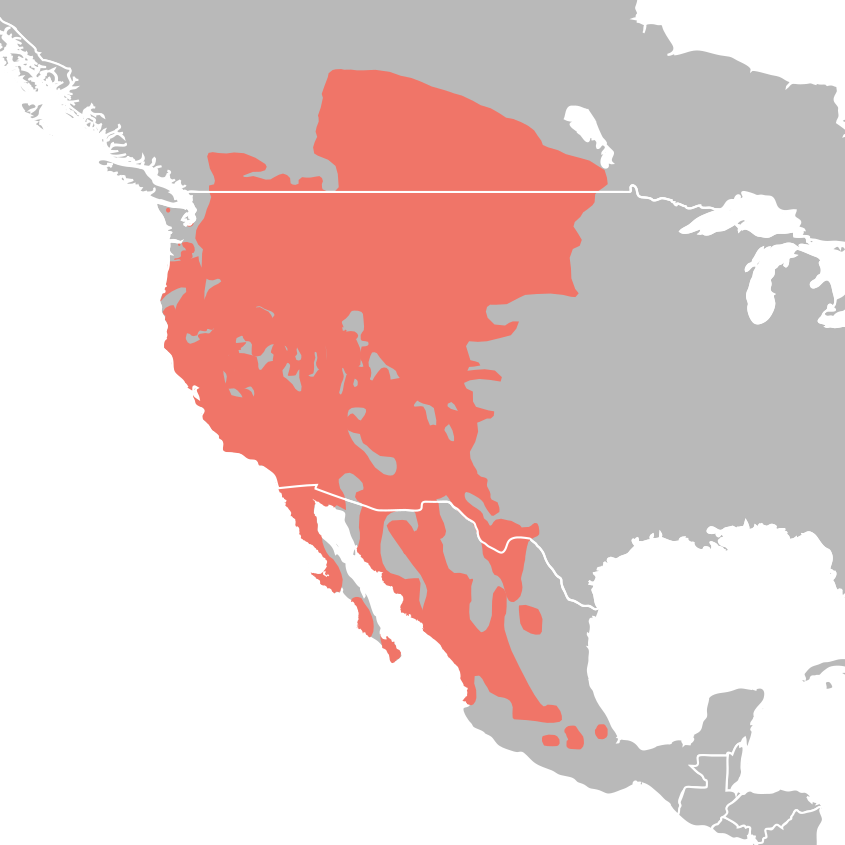
- Thomomys distribution

= Smooth-toothed pocket gopher =

Smooth-toothed pocket gophers Temporal range: Early Pliocene - Recent

Genus of mammals

The smooth-toothed pocket gophers, genus Thomomys, are so called because they are among the only pocket gophers without grooves on their incisors. They are also called the western pocket gophers because they are distributed in western North America. They are considered distinct enough from other pocket gophers to be recognized as a separate subfamily or tribe.

== Natural history ==
Thomomys gophers are highly fossorial. They rely on their incisors for digging more than most other gophers. They feed on plants, largely from beneath the surface, but they do come above ground at night. Roots, stems, leaves, and bulbs are eaten. When not directly in an agricultural field they are a benefit to humans by enriching soil and preventing runoff.

== Species ==
Over one hundred subspecies have been described, but not all are currently recognized by modern authorities. Like many fossorial rodents, Thomomys shows a great deal of allopatric variation.

- Thomomys
  - Subgenus Megascapheus
    - Thomomys atrovarius
    - Thomomys bottae - Botta's pocket gopher
    - Thomomys bulbivorus - Camas pocket gopher
    - Thomomys nayarensis
    - Thomomys sheldoni
    - Thomomys townsendii - Townsend's pocket gopher
    - Thomomys umbrinus - southern pocket gopher
  - Subgenus Thomomys
    - Thomomys clusius - Wyoming pocket gopher
    - Thomomys idahoensis - Idaho pocket gopher
    - Thomomys mazama - Mazama pocket gopher (including the extinct subspecies Thomomys mazama tacomensis - Tacoma pocket gopher)
    - Thomomys monticola - mountain pocket gopher
    - Thomomys talpoides - northern pocket gopher

== General characteristics ==
Thomomys, commonly referred to as smooth-toothed pocket gophers, is a group of rodents belonging to the family Geomyidae. Members of Thomomys are unique among gophers in that they have smooth upper incisors, free of the grooves that are common in other species. All species share the trait of fur-lined, external cheek pockets that allow them to move food material to and from their underground dwellings. Size varies among species, but commonly ranges from the size of a smaller mole to a larger rat. Coloration can range from yellow, to grey, to brown, and even black. They are all full-bodied with squat legs, short hair, and small eyes and ears.

Pocket gophers have special visual adaptations to match their extreme and unique subterranean lifestyle. Though the size of their eyes are typical for rodents, the lens is able to transmit light rays that fall into the ultraviolet range. They possess three different photopigments: two cone pigments specific to 367 nm and 505 nm, and a rod pigment at 495 nm. Overall, the pocket gophers have less rod density than nocturnal rodents.

== Habitat ==
Members of Thomomys inhabit southwestern Canada, the western United States, and a large percentage of Mexico. They thrive in fertile land often used for agriculture, but can be found in many different localities. They prefer areas with high primary productivity and nitrogen soil concentrations.

== Diet ==
They are fossorial herbivores that consume an extensive amount of food for their body size. This could be due to the fact that they expend copious amounts of energy excavating and maintaining their elaborate tunnel systems. It is estimated that burrowing uses 360-3400 times the amount of energy required for above-ground travel. They selectively consume underground parts of perennial and annual grasses, forbs, and woody plants. They are also known to forage above ground, usually close to their burrow entrances. They are choosy and prefer certain species and parts of plants, perhaps due to their high daily energy expenditure.

== Behavior and environmental effects ==
=== Tunneling and mounds ===
Thomomys pocket gophers live underground and create extensive systems of tunnels through which they traverse. They move earth from below ground, and deposit it above ground in piles known as mounds. In snowy regions, they create tunnels through the snow known as earthcores. Earthcores and mounds together can cover up to 30% of the surface in highly excavated areas. The most prominent ecological effect would be that of their tunneling and mounds. The mounds are thought to increase ecological diversity of plants by providing a space for fugitive species that would otherwise have been eliminated due to competition over time. The flora of mounds differs noticeably from the surrounding areas, often with increased numbers of forbs and annuals. The actual mound soil differs in composition from that of the surrounding area as well, creating a different texture and water-holding potential. The ecological impact of this is still relatively unexplored.

=== Effects on agriculture and development ===
These gophers are able to alter the mineral availability, organic molecule concentration, texture, and moisture content of soil. This can be either a benefit or a nuisance depending on the soil condition and usage. In arid or semi-arid environments, these changes enhance vegetation growth and soil quality. They are thought to be able to help generate and regenerate prairie lands that have degraded. However, they are commonly known as pests in areas of agriculture and development. They have and can cause a heavy loss to farmers by consuming the roots or underground crops themselves. Farmers try to control and limit their population in crop areas using a variety of means. In the wild however, their presence is encouraged and advantageous.

==== Control and eradication ====
Many different methods have been used to try to eliminate overpopulation of pocket gophers. These include chemicals, propane blasting, and trapping. A park in Penn Valley, CA installed owl boxes to encourage the habitation of barn owls, a natural pocket gopher predator.

Recommendations released by the University of California, Davis suggest the use of a gopher probe to locate the main burrow. Then a shovel can be used to widen the opening to the main burrow and traps can be set at opposite directions within the burrow. A wide array of different traps can be used, including the choker-style box trap and the pincher trap. Baiting a trap is not always necessary, though it may afford quicker or better results. Lettuce and other vegetables can be used as the bait. It is best to cover the traps with canvas or dirt to conceal the light. If two days pass without success, it is advisable to move the traps. Toxic bait can also be used, but involves a different trap placement strategy.

Fumigation is usually unsuccessful because gophers can quickly seal off their burrows at the first whiff of fumes. The exception to this is fumigation with aluminum phosphide; however, this can only be used by a professional.

Gas explosives and flooding have commonly been utilized to force gophers from their burrows, and while sometimes successful, are not guaranteed to achieve full eradication.
