= Idaho pocket gopher =

Conservation status
- Least Concern (IUCN 3.1)

Scientific classification
- Kingdom: Animalia
- Phylum: Chordata
- Class: Mammalia
- Order: Rodentia
- Family: Geomyidae
- Genus: Thomomys
- Species: T. idahoensis

Binomial name
- Thomomys idahoensis Merriam, 1901
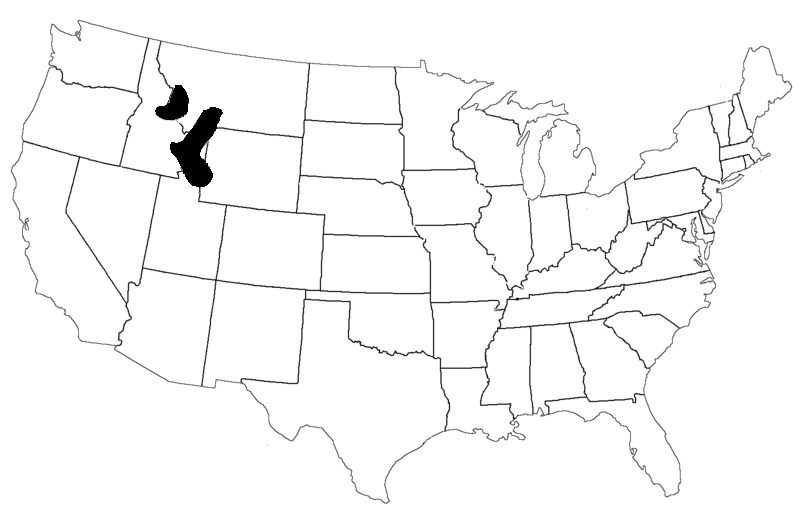
- Range of the Idaho pocket gopher in the United States

Species of rodent in the family Geomyidae

The Idaho pocket gopher (Thomomys idahoensis) is a species of rodent in the family Geomyidae. It is rather small, with a lightly built skull. Its fur color varies through the body and between individuals. Found in the western United States, it inhabits savannas, shrubland, and grasslands. Individuals live alone in burrows, staying active year-round. Many aspects of its behavior and biology are not well understood. The species is classified as being of least-concern by the International Union for the Conservation of Nature.

== Taxonomy ==
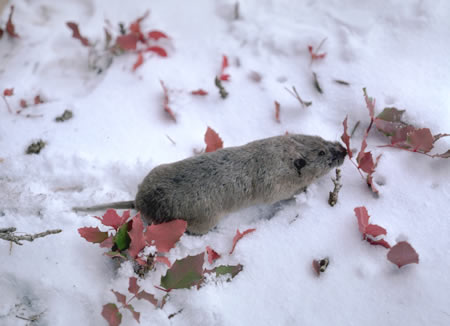
Thomomys talpoides, the Northern pocket gopher, of which the Idaho pocket gopher is closest morphologically.

Thomomys idahoensis was first described by Clinton Hart Merriam in 1901. The type locality was given as Birch Creek, Idaho, and the type specimen was a male collected in 1890. It has no recent synonyms, although its two of its subspecies (T. i. idahoensis and T. i. pygmaeus) were once considered subspecies of Thomomys talpoides, the northern pocket gopher. It belongs to the genus Thomomys, which is distributed throughout western North America. This genus is part of the family Geomyidae.

=== Subspecies ===
Three subspecies are recognized:

- T. i. idahoensis (Merriam, 1901) — high variance in size and coloration in different populations within the subspecies, found in eastern Idaho and nearby parts of Montana. The largest are found in the Snake River Plain.
- T. i. pygmaeus (Merriam, 1901) — small and dark brown, found in southwestern Wyoming, southwestern Idaho, and northern Utah. It is the only subspecies found in Utah.
- T. i. confinus (Davis, 1937) — found in western Montana.

== Description ==
The size, weight, and hindfoot length of the Idaho pocket gopher are variable, although typically no more than 150 millimetres (5.9 in), 90 grams (3.2 oz), and 26 millimetres (1.0 in) for each, respectively. The color of the back ranges from yellowish brown with dark brown tipped hair to grayish brown or fully dark brown, fairly uniform overall. Most are dark gray around the nose. The ventral area is light gray and usually mixed with yellow and yellow-brown. The feet are whitish in appearance, with tail color varying between specimens. It is paler in winter than summer.

The gopher's skull is small and lightly built, with incisors that are slender and not procumbent (inclined towards the lips). Its baculum (a bone present in the penis of many mammals) is rather long, from 17.8 to 23.4 millimetres (0.70 to 0.92 in), and the bullae (bony structures in the back of the skull) are large. It has either 56 or 58 chromosomes (the difference is due to Robertsonian translocation, a condition where a chromosome becomes attached to another). The ears are small.

== Distribution and habitat ==
The Idaho pocket gopher is found in the western United States, from central Idaho to the southern and western parts of Montana. A separate population exists in southwestern Wyoming, southeastern Idaho, and northeastern Utah. It resides in savanna, shrubland, and grassland habitats.

== Behavior and ecology ==
Individuals live in burrows, with each gopher creating and living in its own burrow. They remain active for the entire year, and store excavated soil in their burrows, which stays after the snow has melted. It is sympatric in certain areas with the northern pocket gopher, which it does not interbreed with. The former species prefers shallower, rockier soils, while the latter prefers deeper soil with fewer rocks.

It is not known what the Idaho pocket gopher eats, although related species consume parts of plants from vegetation below and above ground level, mainly forbs and grasses.

== Reproduction and life cycle ==
Little is known about the life history of this species, with no known data on breeding season and litter size. It most likely breeds in spring after the snow has melted. It is likely similar to the northern pocket gopher with regards to breeding behavior: the latter species gestates for 19 to 20 days and bears between four and seven offspring. Its lifespan is also unknown, although pocket gophers usually live for less than two years.

== Conservation ==
There is no known existence of this species in protective areas or captivity. It is protected by the US state of Montana. The IUCN has evaluated it as being of least-concern, as no major threats are present, it has a large range, and its population is not declining fast enough to warrant a more threatened listing (although the population trend is unknown). It is listed in the Utah Wildlife Action Plan as a species greatly needing conservation.
