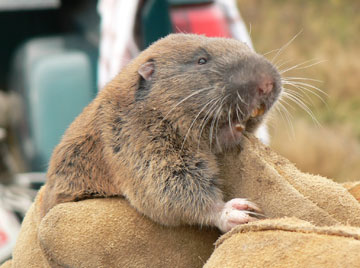
- An image of a separate subspecies of the Mazama pocket gopher

Conservation status
- Extinct (1970)

Scientific classification
- Kingdom: Animalia
- Phylum: Chordata
- Class: Mammalia
- Infraclass: Placentalia
- Order: Rodentia
- Family: Geomyidae
- Genus: Thomomys
- Species: T. mazama
- Subspecies: †T. m. tacomensis

Trinomial name
- †Thomomys mazama tacomensis Taylor, 1919

= Tacoma pocket gopher =

Extinct subspecies of rodent

The Tacoma pocket gopher (Thomomys mazama tacomensis) was a subspecies of the Mazama pocket gopher that was restricted to a few isolated populations in the southern Puget Sound area and on the Olympic Peninsula in Washington. The first specimen was collected in 1853 by Suckley and Cooper at Fort Steilacoom, but it was only officially described in 1919 by Taylor. Its range is believed to have covered an area from Point Defiance in Tacoma, south to Steilacoom, and east to Puyallup. The subspecies is considered to have become extinct by 1970, with the cause being thought to be primarily residential development and destruction of the prairie habitat it relied on; the last recorded specimens may have been killed by cats. Another subspecies from Washington, T. m. louiei, has been presumed extinct; however, this is less certain.

== Description ==
It has a darker color than the other pocket gophers in the Western Washington lowlands, closely resembling T. m. yelmensis but having a darker winter coat and face, more extensive black area behind the ears, and narrow nose towards the front. It is also similar to T. m. melanops, but has a larger interparietal. Its winter coat is a brown-orange color, speckled with black. Its face is a blackish color, extending to a 1-centimeter square area behind the ears. The nose tends to have white spots with white or gray whiskers. The underside is a light tan color, lacking the scattered white patches seen in some T. m. yelmensis. Its skull is roughly equivalent to that of T. m. yelmensis, but tends to have narrower nasal bones towards the front, smaller nasal openings, a slimmer rostrum, more rounded cranium, and shorter and narrower interparietal bones.
