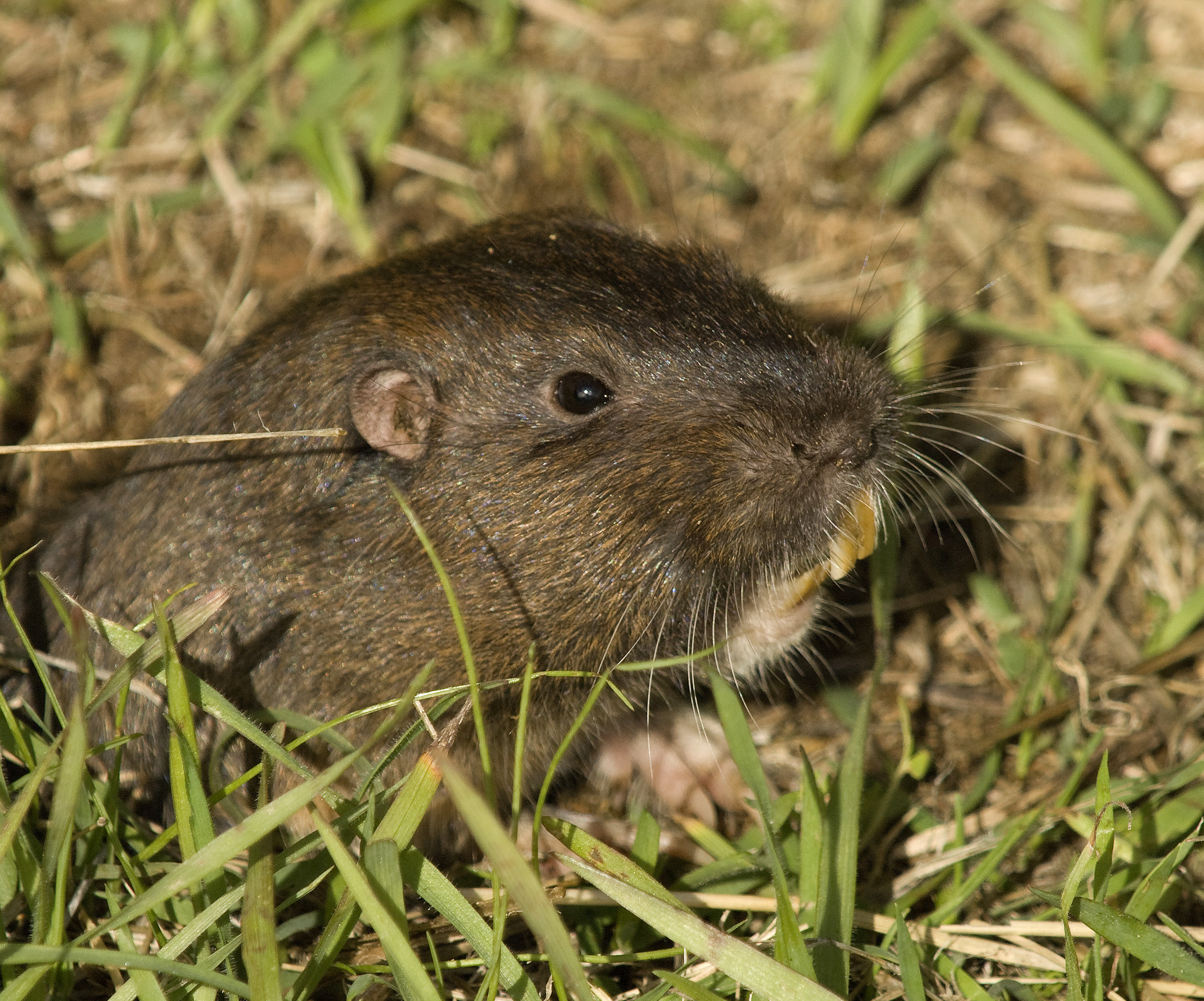

Conservation status
- Least Concern (IUCN 3.1)

Scientific classification
- Kingdom: Animalia
- Phylum: Chordata
- Class: Mammalia
- Order: Rodentia
- Family: Geomyidae
- Genus: Thomomys
- Species: T. bottae

Binomial name
- Thomomys bottae (Eydoux & Gervais, 1836)
- Botta's pocket gopher range

= Botta's pocket gopher =

Species of mammal

Botta's pocket gopher (Thomomys bottae) is a pocket gopher native to western North America. It is also known in some areas as valley pocket gopher, particularly in California. Both the specific and common names of this species honor Paul-Émile Botta, a naturalist and archaeologist who collected mammals in California in 1827 and 1828.

== Description ==
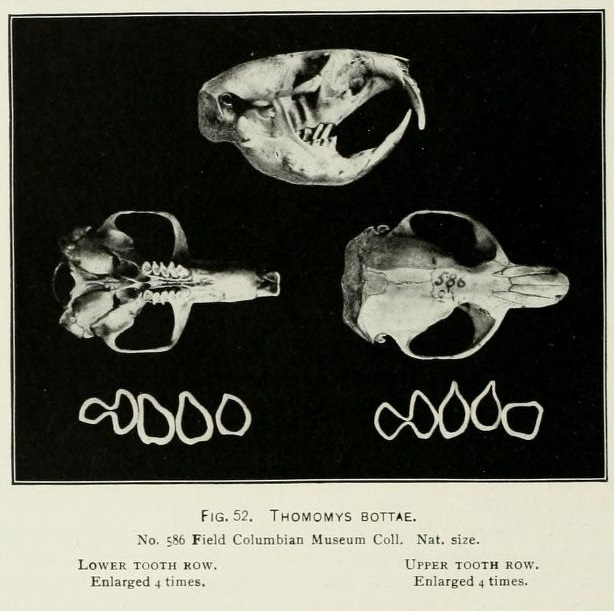
Botta's pocket gopher skull and teeth from Elliot 1901

Botta's pocket gopher is a medium-sized gopher, with adults reaching a length of 18 to 27 cm (7.1 to 10.6 in), including a tail of 5 to 6 cm (2.0 to 2.4 in). The overall dental formula is 10131013. Males are larger, with a weight of 160–250 g (5.6–8.8 oz), compared with 120–200 g (4.2–7.1 oz) in the females. Male pocket gophers are widely believed to continue growing throughout their life. However, size variation would indicate that some males are predisposed to be larger than others, and the largest male may not be the oldest. Coloration is highly variable, and has been used to help distinguish some of the many subspecies; it may also change over the course of a year as the animals molt. Both albino and melanistic individuals have also been reported. However, Botta's gopher generally lacks the black stripe down the middle of the back found in the closely related southern pocket gopher, a feature that may be used to tell the two species apart where they live in the same area.

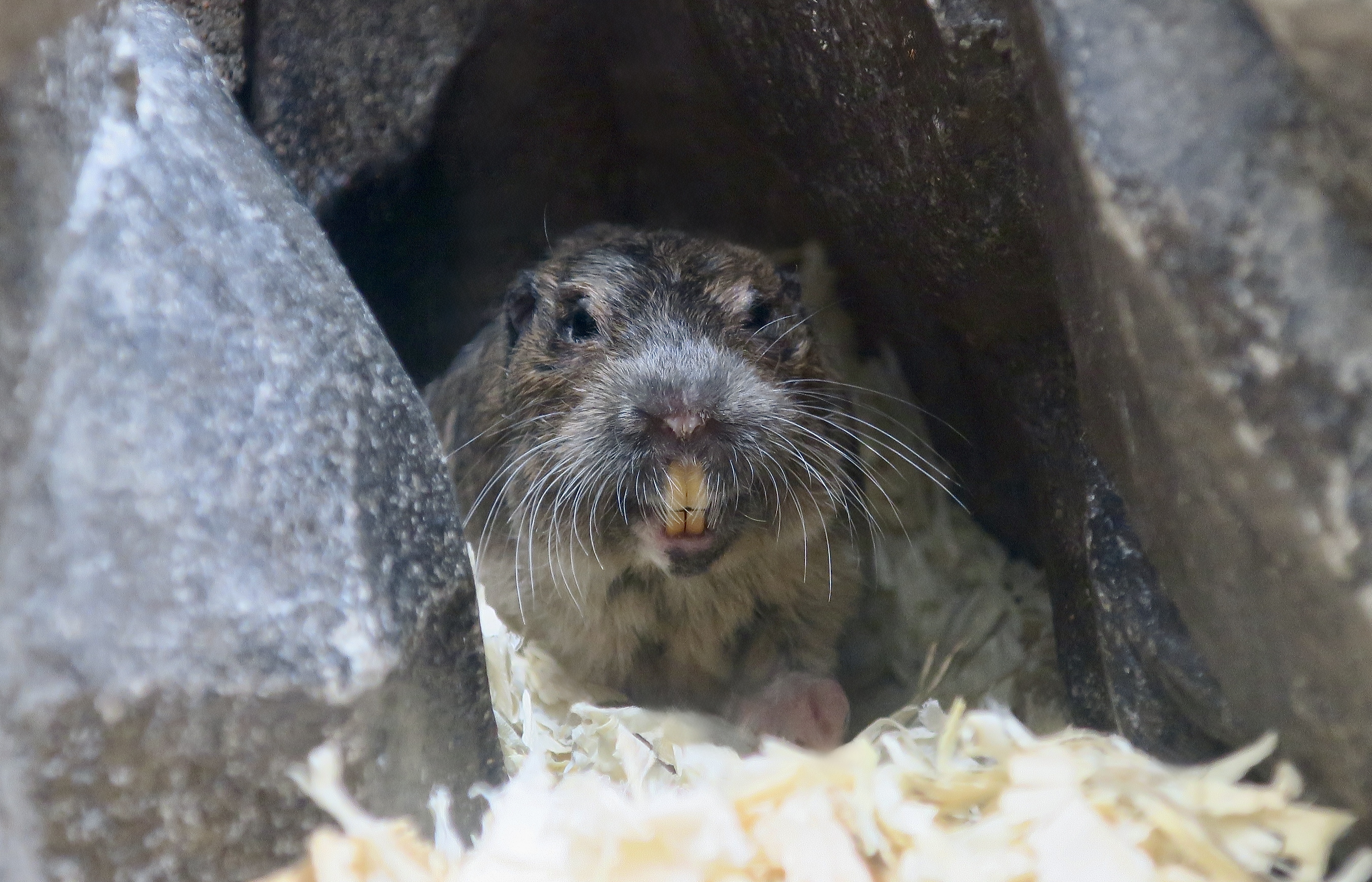
A Botta's pocket gopher showing its incisors and whiskers at Wildlife World Zoo

== Distribution ==
Botta's pocket gophers are found from California east to Texas, and from Utah and southern Colorado south to Mexico. Within this geographical area, they inhabit a range of habitats, including woodlands, chaparral, scrubland, and agricultural land, being limited only by rocky terrain, barren deserts, and major rivers. They are found at elevations up to at least 4,200 metres (13,800 ft). Skeletal remains of Botta's pocket gophers, dating back 31,000 years, have been identified from Oklahoma.

Around 195 subspecies have been described, mostly on the basis of geographical distribution. Some of these have previously been described as distinct species in their own right. The distribution of the type localities of these subspecies is as follows:

- California – 43 (including the nominate subspecies)
- Oregon – 2 (both in the extreme south of the state)
- Nevada – 16
- Utah – 20
- Arizona – 43
- New Mexico – 15
- Colorado – 4
- Texas – 10 (all in the western region of the state)
- Baja California – 16
- Baja California Sur – 8
- Sonora – 8
- Chihuahua – 2
- Coahuila – 6
- Sinaloa – 2 (both in the extreme north of the state)

== Ecology ==
Botta's pocket gopher is strictly herbivorous, feeding on a variety of plant matter. Shoots and grasses are particularly important, supplemented by roots, tubers, and bulbs during the winter. An individual often pulls plants into the ground by the roots to consume them in the safety of its burrow, where it spends 90% of its life.

The metabolic rate, consumption rate and amount of energy assimilated for non-reproductive adult gophers is consistent through winter, spring, summer and fall. The average adult Botta's pocket gopher has a body temperature of 36 °C (97 °F). Burrowing can be extremely energetically demanding requiring between 360 and 3,400 times as much energy as moving across the surface, depending on soil density. Due to the high cost of burrowing, Botta's pocket gopher is good at conserving energy by having a low basal metabolic rate and thermal conductance.

The main predators of this species include American badgers, coyotes, long-tailed weasels, and snakes, but other predators include skunks, owls, bobcats, and hawks. This species is considered a pest in urban and agricultural areas due to its burrowing habit and its predilection for alfalfa; however, it is also considered beneficial as its burrows are a key source of aeration for soils in the region.

Digging by Botta's pocket gophers is estimated to aerate the soil to a depth of about 20 cm (7.9 in), and to be responsible for the creation of Mima mounds up to 2 m (6 ft 7 in) in height. Populations of the species have been estimated to mine as much as 28 t (28 long tons; 31 short tons) of soil per hectare per year, much of which is moved below ground, rather than being pushed up into the mounds. The species also has been associated with the deaths of aspen in Arizona and creates patches of bare ground that may limit the establishment of new seedlings.

== Behavior ==
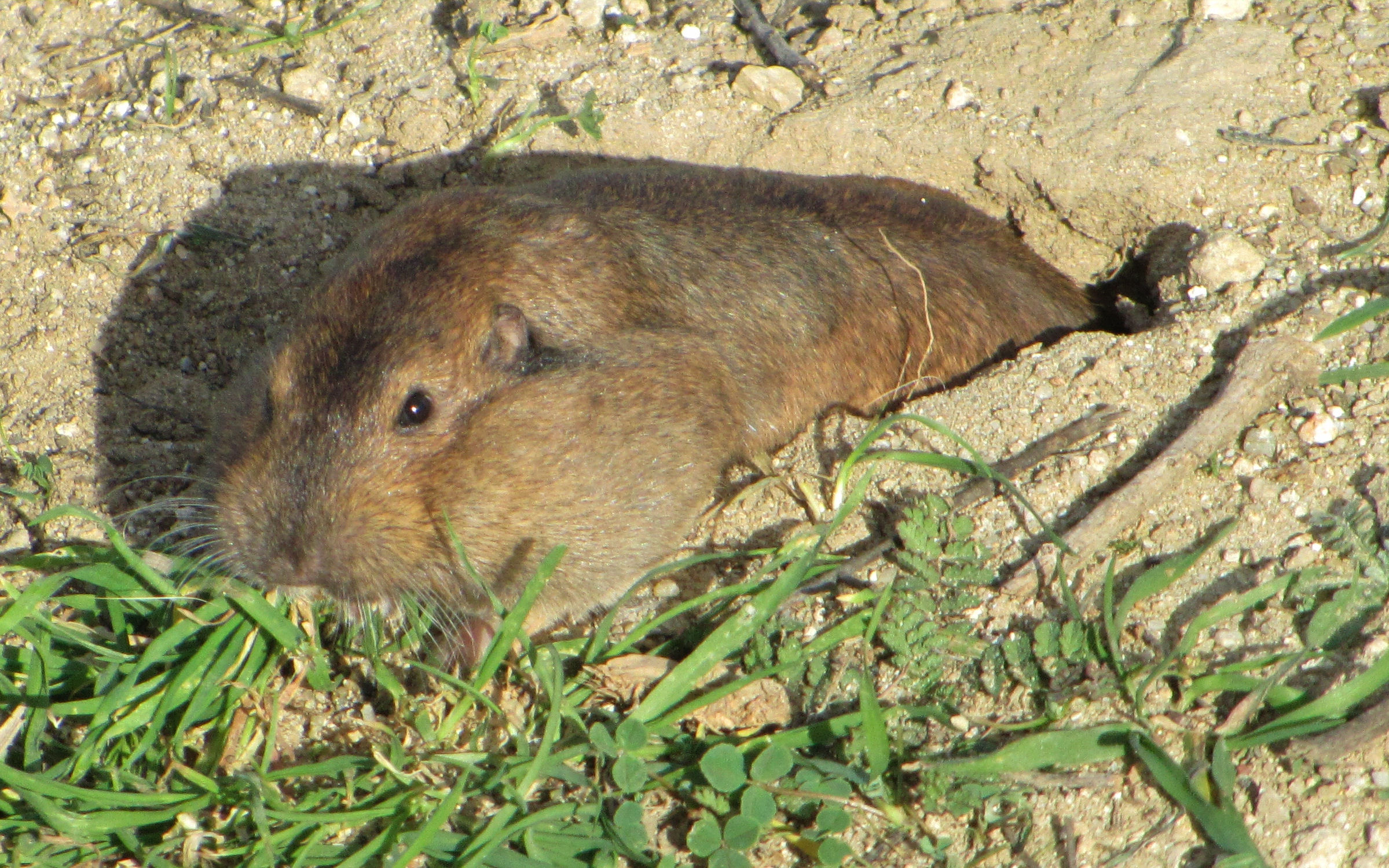
An individual emerging from a burrow in southern California

Botta's pocket gopher is highly adaptable, burrowing into a very diverse array of soils from loose sands to tightly packed clays, and from arid deserts to high altitude meadows. They are able to tolerate such a wide range of soils in part because they dig primarily with their teeth, which are larger and with a thicker layer of enamel than in claw-digging gophers. In comparison, gophers digging with their claws are generally only able to dig in softer soils, because their claws wear down more quickly than teeth do in harder materials.

Botta's pocket gophers are active for a total of about nine hours each day, spending most of their time feeding in their burrows, but are not restricted to either daylight or night time. They make little sound, although they do communicate by making clicking noises, soft hisses, and squeaks.

Their burrows include multiple deep chambers for nesting, food storage, and defecation, that can be as much as 1.6 m (5 ft 3 in) below ground. A series of tunnels close to the surface is used for feeding on plant roots, with shorter side tunnels for disposal of excavated soil. On the surface, the burrows are marked by fan-shaped mounds of excavated soil, with the actual entrance usually kept filled in for protection. Population densities between 10 and 62 per acre have been reported.

Aboveground traces of these burrows are sometimes called "gopher eskers".

Outside of the breeding season, each burrow is inhabited by a single adult, with any young leaving once they are weaned. Male burrows extend over a mean area of 474 m^{2} (5,100 sq ft), and those of females 286 m^{2} (3,080 sq ft), but the gophers aggressively defend a larger exclusive area, of 810 m^{2} (8,700 sq ft) for males and 390 m^{2} (4,200 sq ft) for females, around the burrow entrance.

== Reproduction ==
In areas with sufficient food, such as agricultural land, breeding can occur year-round, with up to four litters being born each year. In the north, and other, less hospitable, environments, it occurs only during the spring. The local habitat also affects the age at which females begin breeding, with nearly half doing so in their first year in agricultural land, but none at all in desert scrub. Females can breed within the same season they are born, or within three months of their birth. Males tend not to breed until the season after they are born, or at least until they are 6–8 months old.

Gestation lasts 18 days, and results in the birth of a litter of up to 12 pups, although three or four are more typical. The young are born hairless and blind, and measure about 5 cm (2.0 in) in length. The first, silky coat of fur is replaced by a coarser coat of grey hair as the pups age, before the full adult coat develops.

Botta's pocket gophers are capable of breeding with southern pocket gophers, and until the 1980s, were often considered to belong to the same species. However, male hybrids are sterile, and females have greatly reduced fertility, so rarely have offspring of their own. Hybridization with Townsend's pocket gopher has also been reported, and it, too, appears not to extend much beyond the first generation.
