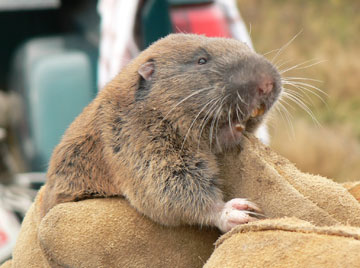

Conservation status
- Least Concern (IUCN 3.1)

- Apparently Secure (NatureServe)

Scientific classification
- Kingdom: Animalia
- Phylum: Chordata
- Class: Mammalia
- Infraclass: Placentalia
- Order: Rodentia
- Family: Geomyidae
- Genus: Thomomys
- Species: T. mazama

Binomial name
- Thomomys mazama Merriam, 1897

Subspecies
- Thomomys mazama couchi; Thomomys mazama glacialis; Thomomys mazama helleri; Thomomys mazama hesperus; Thomomys mazama louiei; Thomomys mazama mazama; Thomomys mazama melanops; Thomomys mazama nasicus; Thomomys mazama niger; Thomomys mazama oregonus; Thomomys mazama premaxillaris; Thomomys mazama pugetensis; Thomomys mazama tacomensis; Thomomys mazama tumuli; Thomomys mazama yelmensis
- Distribution of the Mazama pocket gopher

= Mazama pocket gopher =

Species of mammal

The Mazama pocket gopher (Thomomys mazama) is a smooth-toothed pocket gopher restricted to the Pacific Northwest. The herbivorous species ranges from coastal Washington, through Oregon, and into north-central California. Four subspecies of the Mazama Pocket Gopher are classified as threatened under the Endangered Species Act of 1973, including T. m. pugetensis (Olympia pocket gopher), T. m. tumuli (Tenino pocket gopher), T. m. glacialis (Roy Prairie pocket gopher), and T. m. yelmensis (Yelm pocket gopher). The Mazama Pocket Gopher is one of the smallest of 35 species in the pocket gopher family.

== Description ==
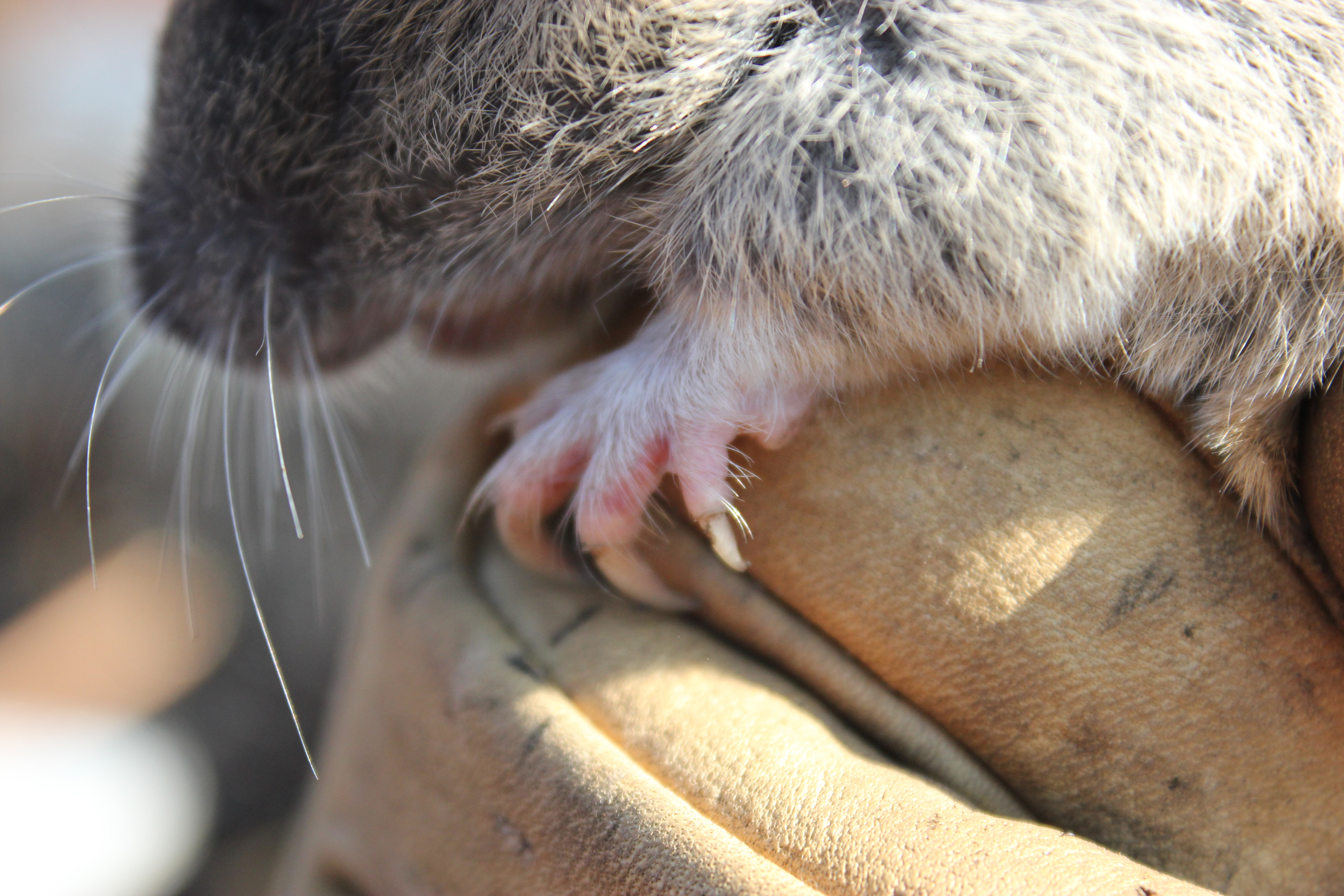
Thomomys mazama claws

Mazama pocket gophers are light brown to black in color, with adults ranging in size from 5 to 6 inches (13 to 15 cm) in length. The Mazama pocket gopher's distinctive features include pointed claws, long whiskers, and protruding chisel-like front teeth. The pocket gopher serves as prey for a variety of predatory species. The species has poor vision, but excels at digging burrows with their long claws and strong limbs and its burrows are used by a number of other species.

The gophers transport food and nesting material by fur pouches on their bodies and pockets within their cheeks. The gopher's diet consists of plant material, mostly vegetation, roots and tubers. According to a study conducted in South-Central Oregon between 1973 and 1974, the Mazama Pocket Gopher's diet consists mostly of above ground parts of forbs, grasses, woody plants, and plant roots. These comprised 40%, 32%, 4%, and 24% of their diet, respectively, by volume, per a study which examined the contents of the stomachs of 110 Mazama Pocket Gophers. The diet of the Mazama Pocket Gopher adapts to the availability of different foods, however they tend to choose the most succulent foods available throughout the year.

The gophers exhibit asocial behaviors except during the gestation and mating season. Mating is believed to be polygamous. Gestation lasts around 18 days, with each litter averaging 3 or 4 young. Females will usually have one litter per year between March and June.

== Ecology ==
The Mazama pocket gophers are important to the prairie ecosystem it inhabits. Each gopher is capable of turning over 3–7 tons of soil per acre per year. Their presence is beneficial for plant diversity, with one study showing 5–48% higher as a result. Frogs, toads, small mammals and lizards also use their gopher burrows. Pocket gophers form an angled tunnel in the ground as they dig for roots to eat. In this process, they transform the soil into a soft and sifted powder, in turn creating a unique, irregularly shaped mound with an off-center hole.

== Distribution ==
The Mazama Pocket Gopher is mainly local to areas with herbaceous vegetation and well-drained glacial soil. The total population is unknown, but believed to exceed 100,000, a majority of population resides in the state of Oregon. There are 27 known populations in the state of Washington, with an estimated 2000–5000 individuals total. The state of Washington has listed the Mazama pocket gopher and its subspecies found in the Puget Sound area as threatened.

=== Washington ===
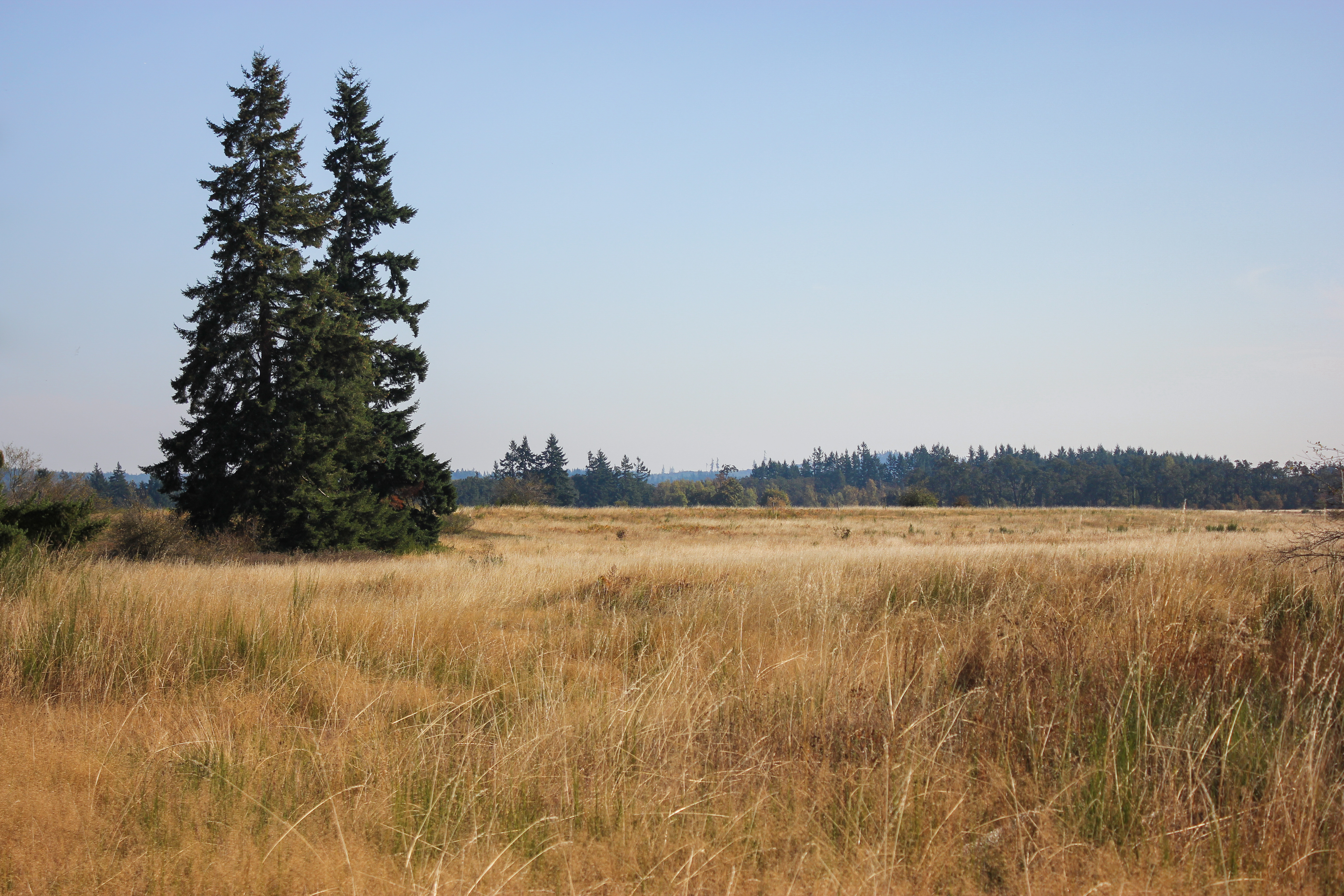
Mazama pocket gopher habitat

The Mazama pocket gopher in Washington has suffered habitat loss, with the remaining habitats being located in unexpected places. The largest populations have been found to reside around Fort Lewis and several regional airports. The Olympic National Park cited as another possible location for a sizable population.

A 2005 study reported 6000 gophers living around Olympia airport, but this study has been criticized for its conclusions. The study made count of burrows and did not engage in trapping and marking to estimate the actual number of gophers present. The population is also known to vary erratically, increasing dramatically after the mating season and declining as the year progresses due to predation. This contradicts the estimated population listed on the IUCN database which lists between 2000 and 5000 gophers in the state of Washington with the isolated populations being representative of all 27 populations. The population of the subspecies indigenous to the area is unknown, with two of the sub-species presumed extinct and Thomomys mazama douglasii's status being uncertain and possibly extinct.

== Conservation status ==
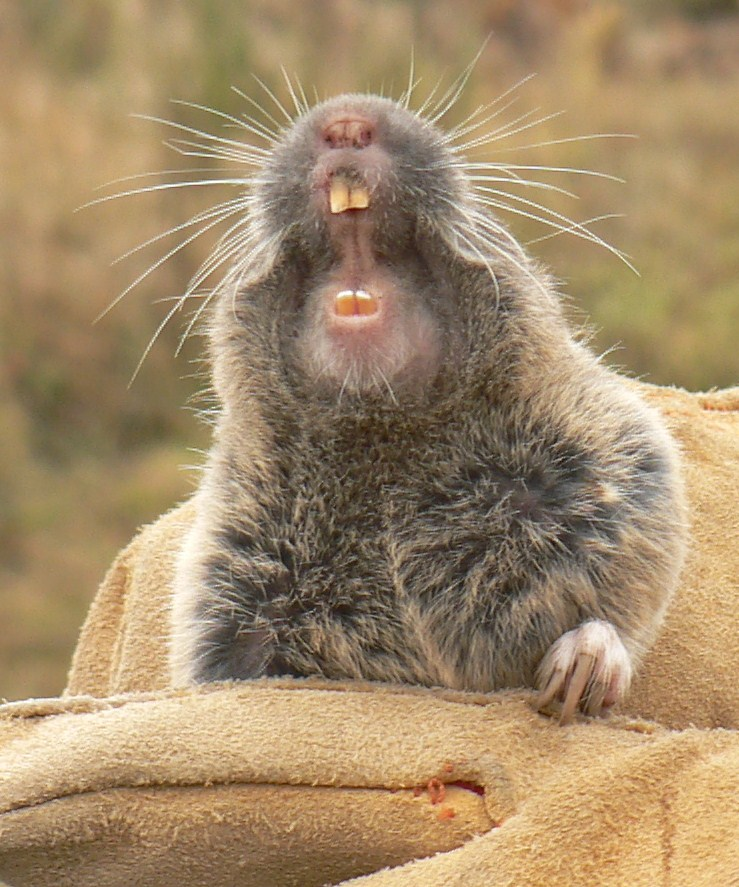
Thomomys mazama mouth agape

The species is currently listed as threatened by the state of Washington. In December 2012, a proposal was made by the U.S. Fish and Wildlife Service to list the gopher as threatened. It would apply to the four local subspecies of the Mazama pocket gopher and their prairie habitat. Their prairie habitat in which the gophers live has been reduced by 90–95% in the last 150 years. A translocation project has been undertaken, but a mortality of 90% has been reported.

The gopher is also listed as a pest in the state of Washington because it is known to cause damage to infrastructure. The gophers can destroy waterlines, endanger livestock, destroy crops and weaken levees and dams.

The conservation of the species has been met with some press coverage. In July 2013, Fox News ran a story about Fort Lewis's $3.5 million grant from the state of Washington to purchase 2,600 acres (1,100 ha) of land during a time when workers were on furlough. Prior to this story, the grant was described by Interior Secretary Sally Jewell as "...taking an important step in addressing one of the greatest threats to wildlife in America today, loss of habitat, while helping to ensure the preservation of working landscapes and our military readiness."

== Control ==
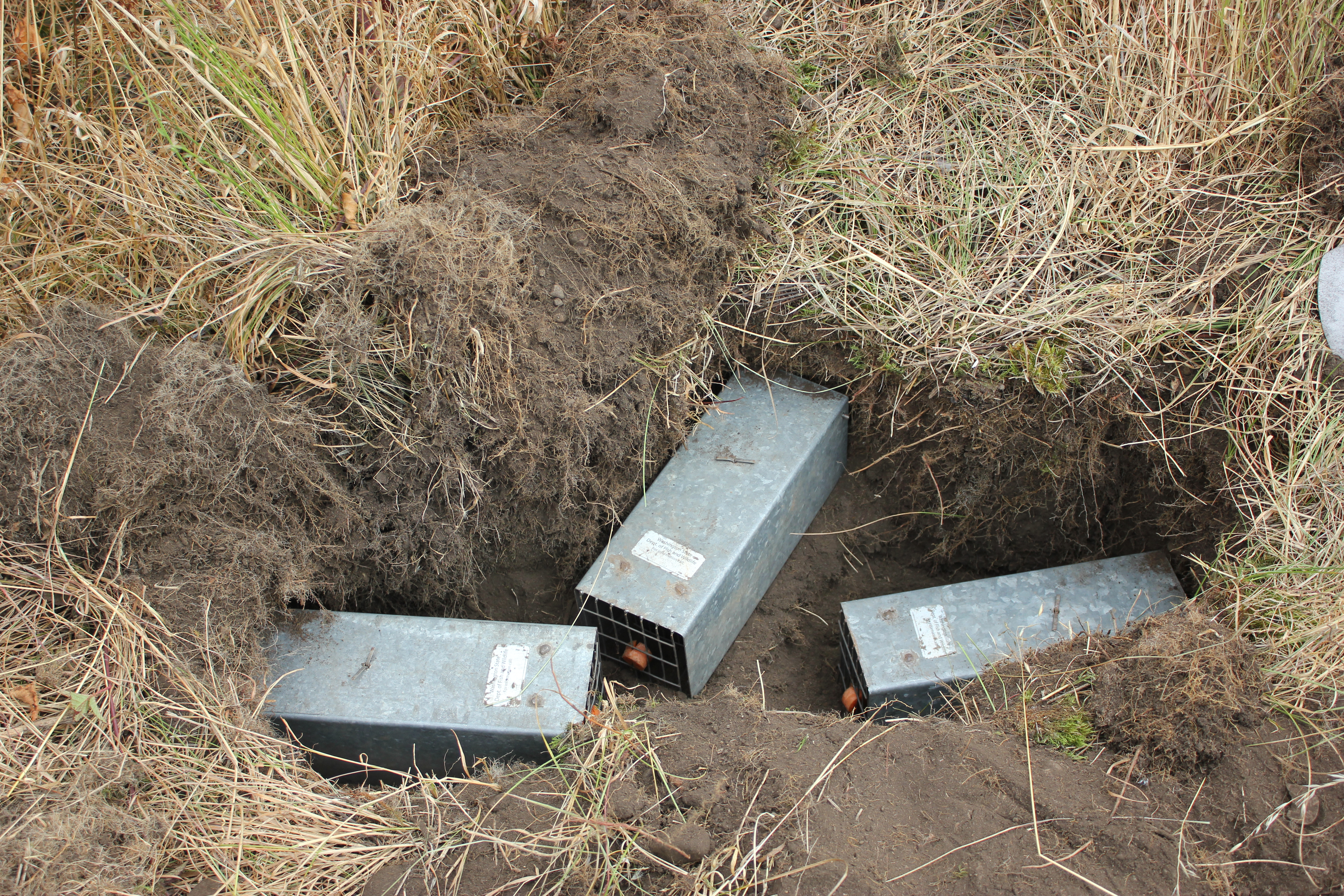
Mazama pocket gopher trapping array

The gophers are known to cause damage to farms and infrastructure through burrowing or consuming vegetation. Damage mitigation can be done by installing a gopher fence, which has to be at least 6 inches (15 cm) above ground and go down to a depth of over 2 feet (0.61 m) or until bedrock or hardpan is struck. This fence is considered a temporary and not permanent defense against the gophers. Gophers are unlikely to be deterred by frightening devices like vibrating stakes, pinwheels and other sound devices. While other methods of control exist, the state of Washington's listing of the species as threatened limits control methods to non-lethal actions. Since pocket gophers feed on conifer seedlings, they threaten reforestation in the Pacific Northwest. Forest management can effectively control Mazama Gophers by altering the vegetation to no longer support the species.

== Taxonomy ==
It is a member of the family Geomyidae and its genus is Thomomys. The Geomyidae family is a group of New World rodents that is related to the Heteromyidae. Thomomys is the classification for western pocket gophers, a smooth-toothed pocket gopher without grooves on their incisors. The Mazama pocket gopher takes its species name from Mount Mazama, the ancient volcano that exploded 6,000 years ago to form Crater Lake in Oregon, where the species was first found. Despite its name, it does not appear in Mazama, Washington.

=== Subspecies ===
Subspecies of the Mazama pocket gopher include:

- †Thomomys mazama tacomensis - the extinct Tacoma pocket gopher
- †Thomomys mazama louiei - presumed extinct
- Thomomys mazama couchi - a vulnerable form in the Puget Sound area.
- Thomomys mazama pugetensis - a vulnerable form in the Puget Sound area.
- Thomomys mazama tumuli - a vulnerable form in the Puget Sound area.
- Thomomys mazama yelmensis - a vulnerable form in the Puget Sound area.
