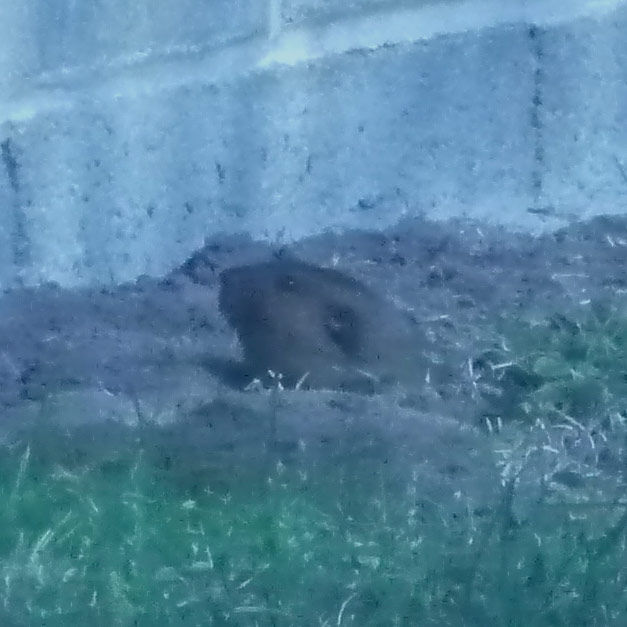

Conservation status
- Least Concern (IUCN 3.1)

Scientific classification
- Kingdom: Animalia
- Phylum: Chordata
- Class: Mammalia
- Order: Rodentia
- Family: Geomyidae
- Genus: Thomomys
- Species: T. monticola

Binomial name
- Thomomys monticola J. A. Allen, 1893

= Mountain pocket gopher =

Species of mammal

The mountain pocket gopher (Thomomys monticola) is a species of rodent in the family Geomyidae. It is endemic to California and Nevada. The Sierra Nevada are part of its range.

== Characteristics ==
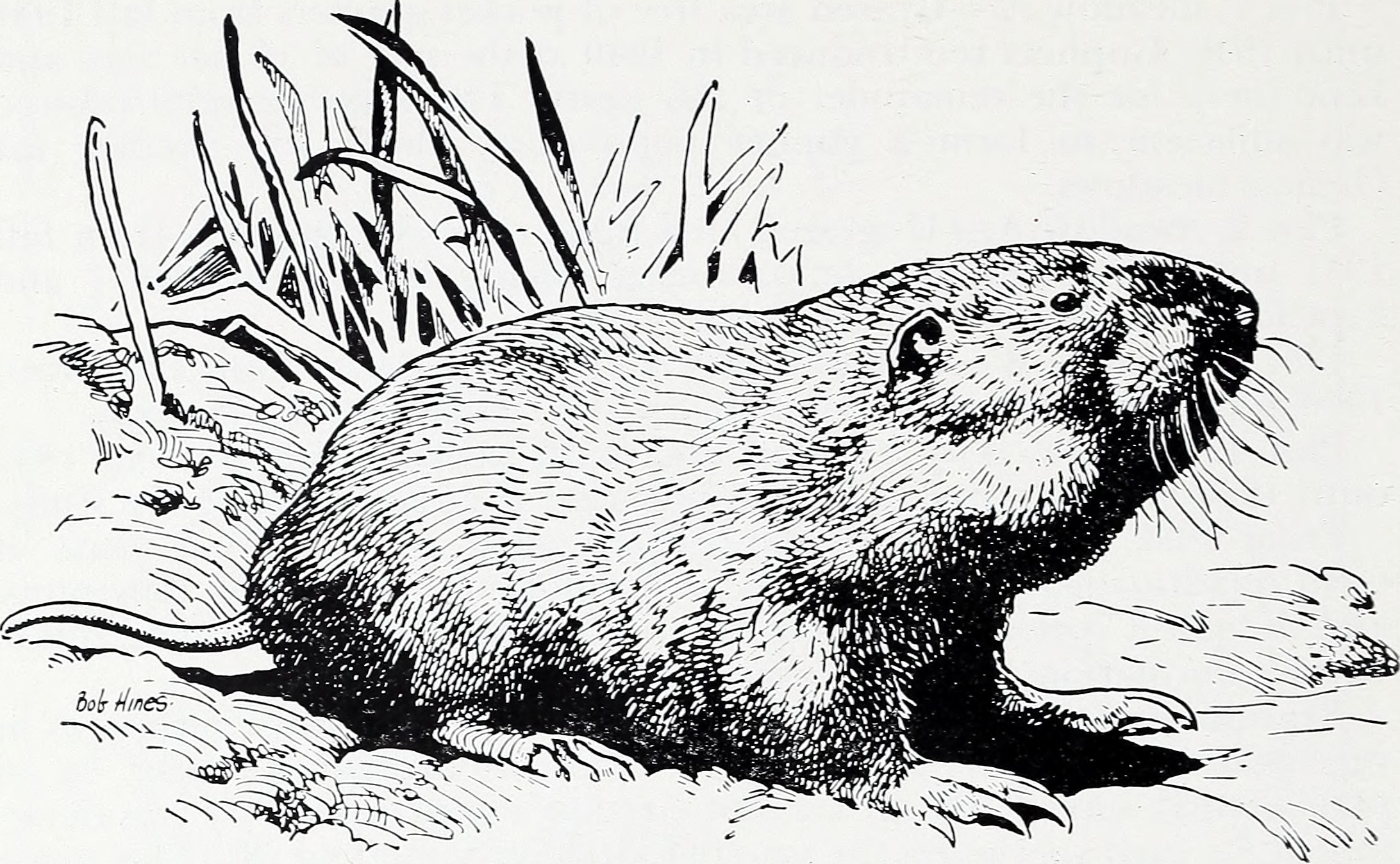

Mountain pocket gophers, as others in the genus Thomomys, have small ears, eyes, and fur-lined cheek pouches. They have short legs with large claws on their feet and smooth incisors. Mountain gophers tend to spend a majority of their time underground and are mostly active at night. They are about 27 centimeters long and 91 grams with brown or gray fur.

== Habitat ==
The mountain pocket gopher naturally occurs on the edges of mountain meadows, wet meadows, and coastal prairies. Also dwelling in upward slopes of forests such as pine and fir, they create complicated tunnel systems in the friable soil of these forest floors. They will live and roam between 0.008 and 0.012 hectares, with tunnel systems anywhere from 200-2,000 square feet. These gophers prefer there to be vegetation above their tunnels and cause heaps of dirt to rise where they surface.

In summer, the gophers tunnel where the groundwater supply is about 4.3 feet below the surface. In winter, to avoid freezing, they will move higher to station underneath trees. When there are thick sheets of snow, mountain gophers will push cylinders of dirt from their burrows outward, leaving several above ground.

== Diet ==
The mountain pocket gopher does not need water in its diet to survive, but instead extracts all its water from the food it consumes. They are herbivores whose primary food sources are forbs such as lupine (a particular favorite) and shrubs including whitethorn ceanothus and gooseberry. Mountain pocket gophers will consume the roots and bulbs of these plants underground and store them in their tunnels. Pocket gophers rarely go aboveground to feed.

== Reproduction ==
Typically the mountain pocket gopher mates during late spring and summer from May to July. They are mostly solitary other than mating. These gophers mate once a year in an underground nest and carry three to four in their litter.
