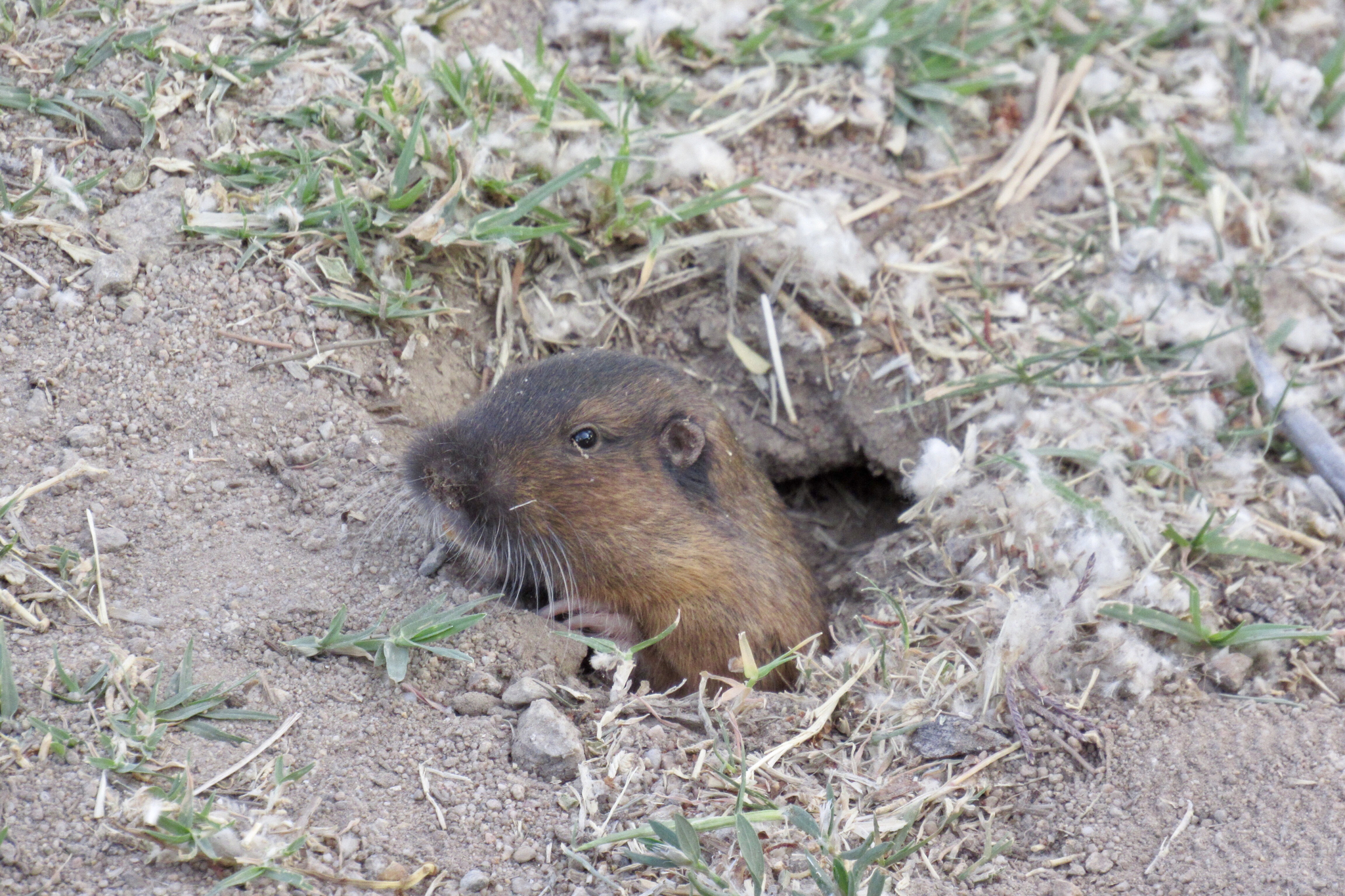
- Photo of Thomomys umbrinus

Conservation status
- Least Concern (IUCN 3.1)

Scientific classification
- Kingdom: Animalia
- Phylum: Chordata
- Class: Mammalia
- Order: Rodentia
- Family: Geomyidae
- Genus: Thomomys
- Species: T. umbrinus

Binomial name
- Thomomys umbrinus (Richardson, 1829)

= Southern pocket gopher =

Species of rodent in the family Geomyidae, found in Mexico and the United States

The southern pocket gopher (Thomomys umbrinus) is a species of rodent in the family Geomyidae. It is found in Mexico and the United States, usually in high altitude grassland and shrubland. It feeds on plant material and has an extensive burrow above which is a large heap of earth on the surface of the ground.

== Description ==
There are a number of subspecies of the southern pocket gopher and they vary in details of their size, the proportions of their skull and their coloring. Adults are commonly between 200 and 250 mm (8 and 10 in) long, with females being generally smaller than males. The upperparts are cinnamon-brown fading to yellowish-buff on the flanks. There are black-tipped hairs on the head making it appear darker, the ears are black and there is a black patch behind the ear. There is white on the cheeks and throat and the underparts are yellowish-buff. The upper surface of the tail is brown and the underside yellowish-buff except for the tip which is white all round.

== Distribution and habitat ==
The southern pocket gopher is native to Mexico and the extreme southwestern United States. Its range extends from the states of Puebla and Veracruz in Mexico northwards to the states of Arizona and New Mexico in the United States. Its typical habitat is high altitude grassland and shrubland, and lower altitude desert grassland and woodland. Its presence in an area can be told from the mounds of soil it throws up during its burrowing activities.

== Ecology ==
The southern pocket gopher does not hibernate and is active at most times of day throughout the year. It feeds on plant material which it finds both above and below the surface of the ground. Predators include owls, hawks, snakes, bobcats, coyotes, weasels and badgers. Life expectancy is probably two to three years. The yellow-nosed cotton rat (Sigmodon ochrognathus) often shares its burrow.

Breeding takes place at differing times of year in different parts of the range. In Arizona, a single litter of usually four or five (but up to ten) young are born in late winter or early spring.

== Status ==
The southern pocket gopher is plentiful in suitable habitat over most of its range although some populations are small and may come and go. The population trend is unknown but no specific threats have been identified and the IUCN has listed this animal's conservation status as being of "least concern".
