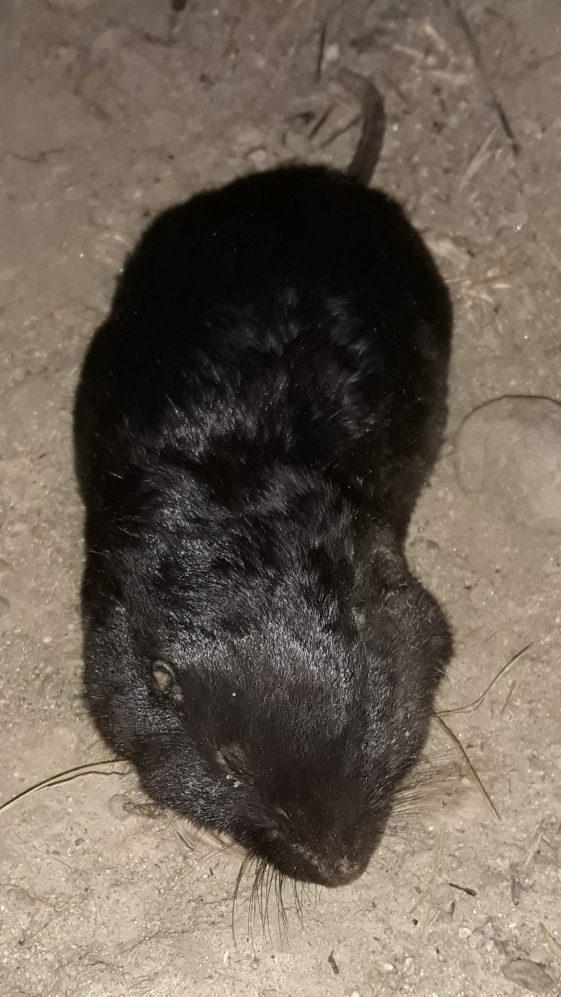

Conservation status
- Least Concern (IUCN 3.1)

Scientific classification
- Kingdom: Animalia
- Phylum: Chordata
- Class: Mammalia
- Order: Rodentia
- Family: Geomyidae
- Genus: Thomomys
- Species: T. townsendii

Binomial name
- Thomomys townsendii (Bachman, 1839)

= Townsend's pocket gopher =

Species of pocket gopher endemic to the northwestern United States

Townsend's pocket gopher (Thomomys townsendii) is a species of pocket gopher endemic to the northwestern United States.

== Description ==
Townsend's pocket gopher is a relatively large gopher, measuring 22 to 29 cm (8.7 to 11.4 in) in total length, including a tail 6 to 10 cm (2.4 to 3.9 in) long. Adults weigh between 190 and 380 g (6.7 and 13.4 oz), with males being significantly larger than females. Like other pocket gophers, they have a large head, a short, muscular neck, small eyes and ears, and short legs. The forefeet are large with powerful digging claws, while the hindfeet are stout, with flat soles. There is a fur-lined cheek pouch on either side of the mouth, from which the name "pocket gopher" derives. Females have eight teats.

The fur is greyish in color over most of the body, but a richer tan on the underparts. There is a patch of white fur on the chin, and some individuals also have white markings on the head. The tail is almost entirely hairless. Melanistic individuals have also been reported, being almost entirely black in color, apart from white spots on the chin or feet.

== Distribution and habitat ==
Townsend's pocket gopher is found in disjunct populations across southern Idaho, northern Nevada, southeastern Oregon, and northeastern California. They inhabit land with deep, moist soils close to rivers and lakes, occasionally as high as 1,980 m (6,500 ft), but more usually in lower valley bottoms. They may also be found in high numbers in artificially irrigated cropland. Their expansion into neighboring areas may be limited by absence of saltgrass, or by competition with Botta's pocket gopher.

Two subspecies are currently recognised:

- T. t. townsendii - Idaho, Malheur River and tributaries in Oregon
- T. t. nevadensis - throughout the remainder of the range

== Biology and behavior ==
Townsend's pocket gopher feeds largely on the root-stalks of saltgrass, but also eats other grasses, alfalfa, and other large rooted plants, including agricultural crops such as potatoes. Common predators include barn owls, and the gopher is also considered to be the primary host of the chewing louse Geomydoecus idahoensis. Breeding probably occurs around January or February, and litters average seven young. Mating is promiscuous, and based on female choice. Hybrids between Townsend's and Botta's pocket gophers have been reported.

Like other pocket gophers, Townsend's species spends most of its adult life underground. Burrows are 10 to 12 cm (3.9 to 4.7 in) wide, and are marked on the surface by numerous mounds of excavated soil. The entrances to the tunnels are normally kept blocked with soil to prevent access by predators. Individuals are solitary outside of the breeding season.
