= Granon =

Granon may refer to:

- Grañón, village in La Rioja, Spain
- Granön, Dalarna, an island and nature reserve in Lake Väsman, near Ludvika in Dalarna county, central Sweden.
- Granön, Jämtland, the largest island in lake Ånnsjön in Jämtland County, Sweden.
- Granön, Kalix, an island in Sweden's Kalix archipelago
- Granön, Luleå, a former island, now part of Hertsön, a Swedish island in the Bothnian Bay, largely occupied by the eastern districts of the city of Luleå.
- Granön, Skellefteå, a former island, now part of Halsön in Sweden's in the Skellefteå archipelago
- Granön, Söderhamn, a peninsula and location of the Trollharen fishing village in the Söderhamn municipality of Sweden
- Granön, Sundsvall, an island in the Gulf of Bothnia near the town of Sundsvall
