= Ånnsjön =

Lake in Åre Municipality, Sweden

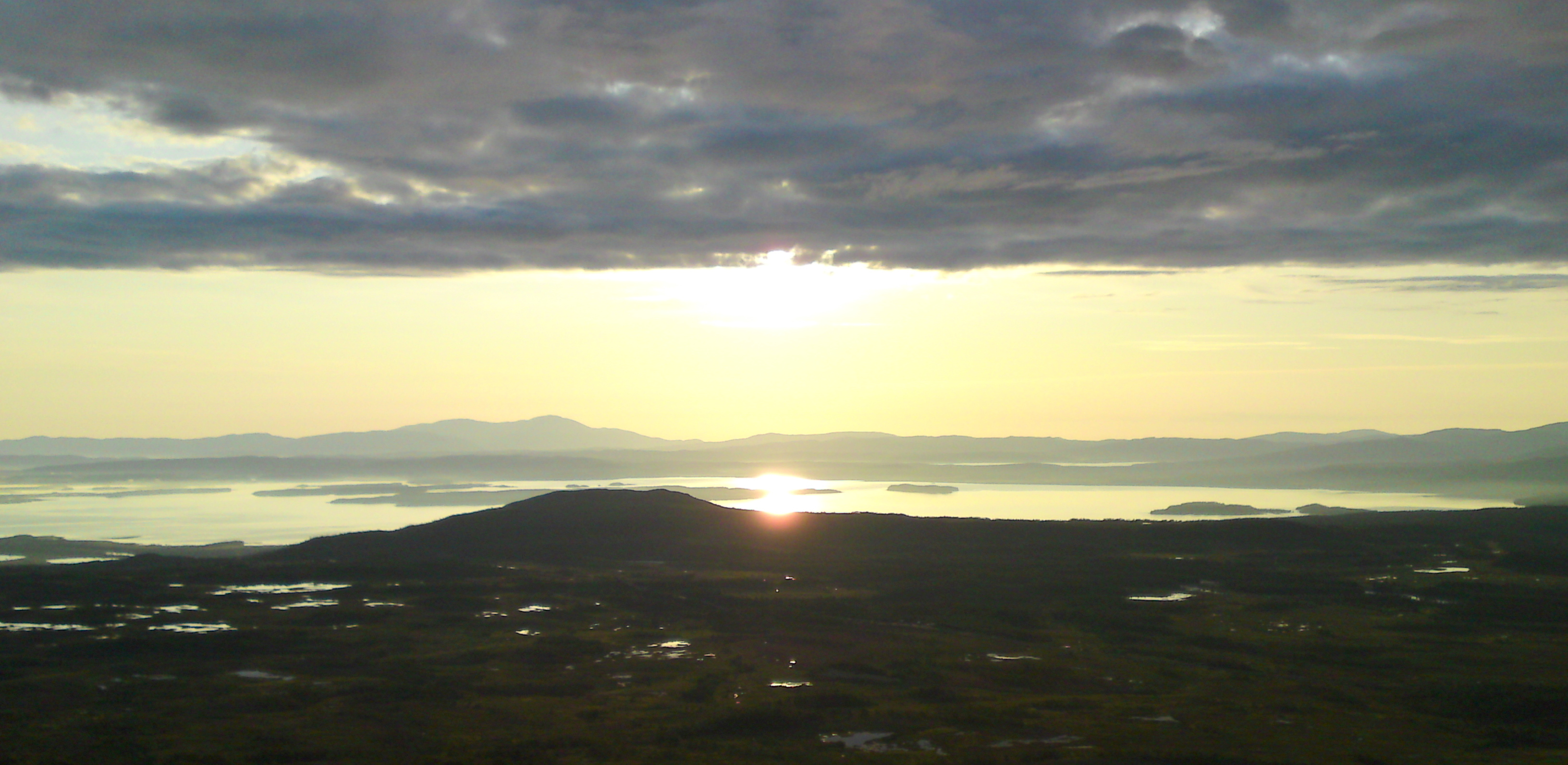
- Sunrise over the lake

- Location within Jämtland Location within Sweden
- Coordinates: 63.257429°N 12.562072°E
- Primary inflows: Enan, Handölan, Västerån, Bunnerån, Järpån, Rekån, Kärrån
- Primary outflows: Landverksströmmen
- Catchment area: 1,562.07 km^{2} (603.12 sq mi)
- Basin countries: Sweden
- Surface area: 59 km^{2} (23 sq mi)
- Shore length^{1}: 89.1 km (55.4 mi)
- Surface elevation: 525 m (1,722 ft)
- Islands: Granön, Årsön, Järpön, Ösan

Ramsar Wetland
- Official name: Ånnsjön
- Designated: 5 December 1974
- Reference no.: 26
- ^{1} Shore length is not a well-defined measure.

Ånnsjön is a lake in Åre Municipality in Jämtland County, Sweden. By road it is located 154 kilometres (96 mi) northwest of Östersund. The lake and surrounding wetlands are rich in fish, water birds and other wildlife. There are remains of human habitation in the region since the Stone Age, including petroglyphs that are among the oldest in Sweden. In the late 19th century there were attempts to drain the wetlands for use in agriculture and forestry, but this is now being reversed. The lake and surroundings is a protected Natura 2000 area, and attracts many birdwatchers.

== Geography ==
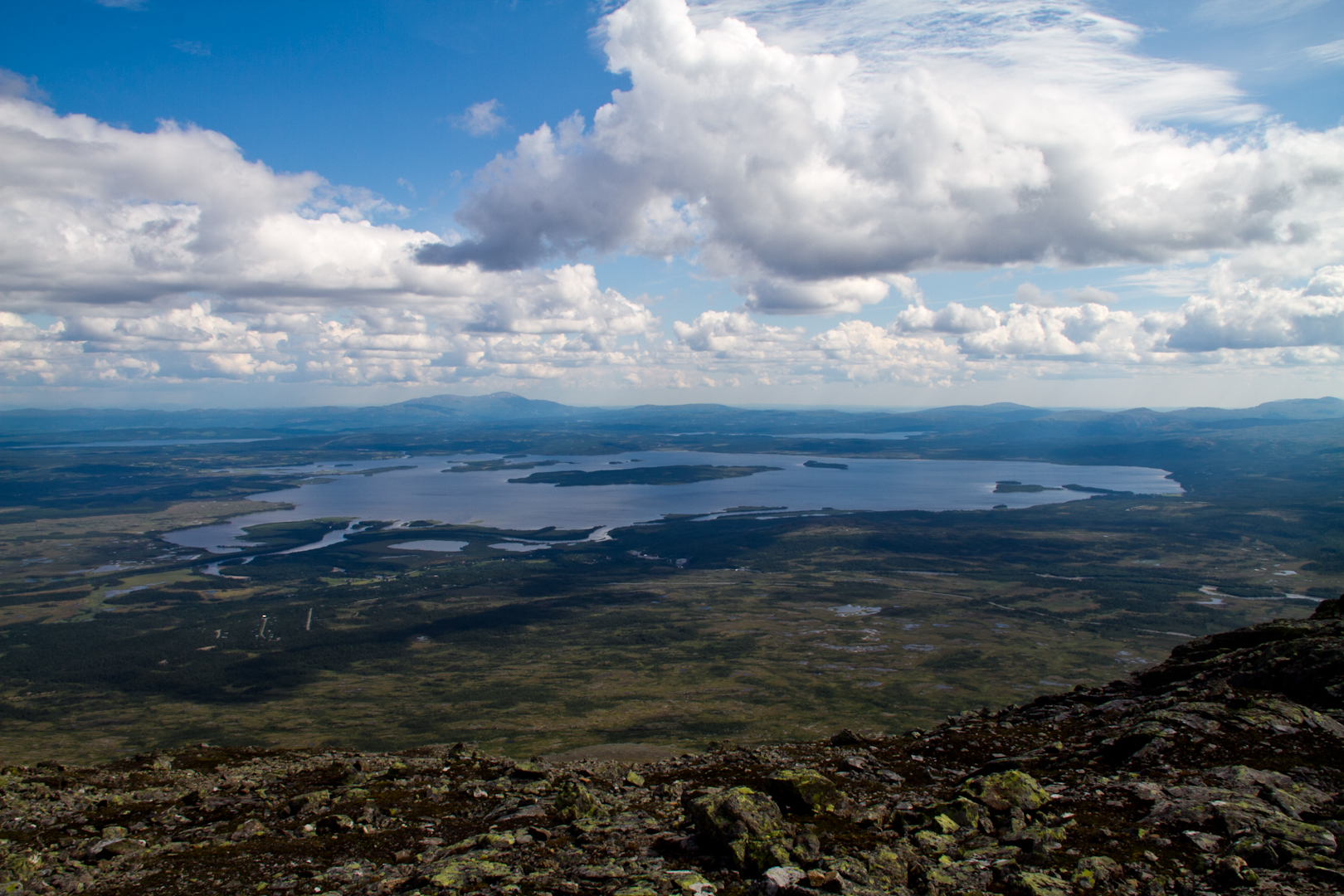
Lake Ånnsjön from the summit of Storsnasen

Ånnsjön is easily accessed via European route E14 through the mountain area of Jämtland, and is therefore one of Sweden's best known mountain lakes. It is about 59 square kilometres (23 sq mi) in area and is 525 metres (1,722 ft) above sea level. Ånnsjön is generally very shallow, around 1 metre (3 ft 3 in), with its greatest depth at 40 metres (130 ft) in the southern part. It is one of several lakes in a basin-like valley surrounded by mountains except to the northeast. The lake is roughly circular, with a diameter of about 10 kilometres (6.2 mi).

There is a sandy ridge along 2 kilometres (1.2 mi) of the shore. The shores include long sandy beaches, pebble beaches, areas of lush vegetation and areas where the lake merges into peat bogs. Ånnsjön is surrounded in part by about 8,000 hectares (20,000 acres) of marshy areas. Ditches dug to drain some of these bogs are now being filled to restore the water levels.

Ånnsjön is fed by the mountain rivers Enan and Handölan. In its lower reaches the Handolan has rapids, waterfalls and gorges. The Enan and Handölan converge just before entering the west of the lake, where the Handöl delta has formed. Other deltas enter the north-west and south-east of the lake. Tributaries draining the mountain area to the south and east of the lake include the Västerån, Bunnerån, Järpån, Rekån and Kärrån. The lake is drained by Landverksströmmen, which exits its northern end. This is the western branch of the Indalsälven river.

Ånnsjön is part of the sub-basin called the "outlet of Ånnsjön", which has an average altitude of 561 metres (1,841 ft) above sea level and an area of 144.5 square kilometres (55.8 sq mi) When all the upstream drainage basins upstream are counted, the accumulated basin area is 1,562.07 square kilometres (603.12 sq mi). The catchment area consists mostly of forest (41%), and marshes (14%).

== History ==
Archeological remains date from the early Stone Age to historical times. The oldest settlements are between 6,000 and 7,000 years old. At that time, soon after deglaciation, the climate was warmer than today and the land would have been more wooded. The shallow Ånnsjön lake and surrounding marsh complex would have provided good resources of fish, waterfowl and other wildlife for the ancient population. About 60 fishing settlements have been located on the shores of the lake and on the islands of Granön, Årsön and Bunnernäset. A large number of relics from the Stone Age have been found in the area, mainly around Bunnerviken. Among the finds is a dagger of red stone with a handle carved into a beautiful moose head.

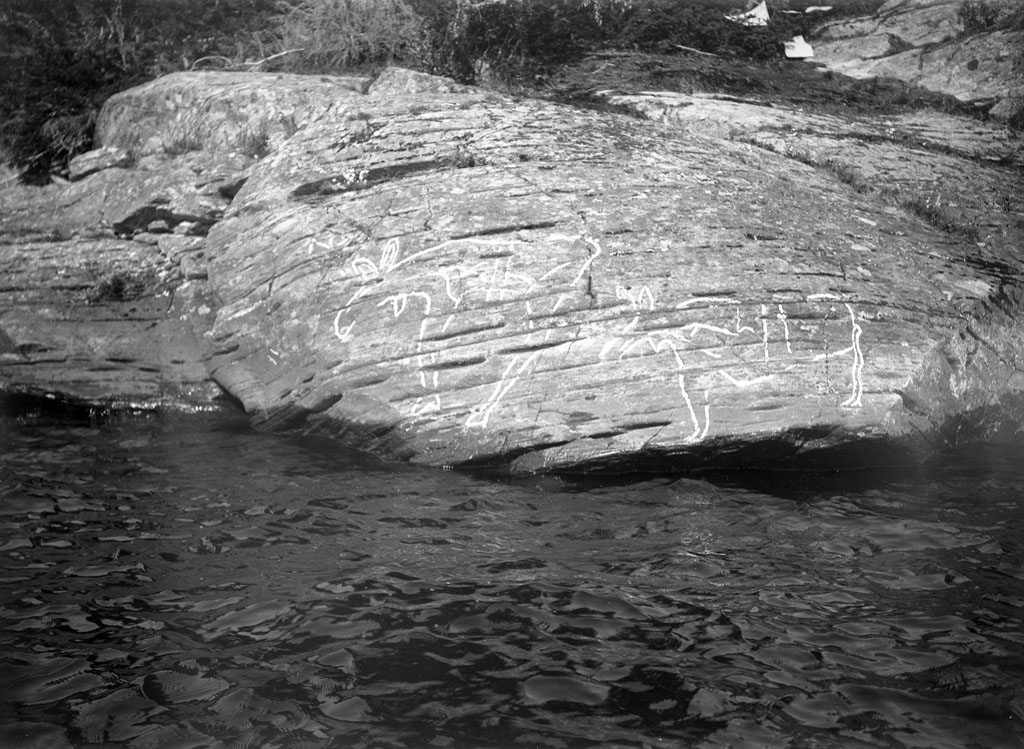
Rock carving with elks

There are Petroglyphs at Landsverk and Håltbergsudden. The carvings at Landsverk consists of two of moose 1.5 metres (4 ft 11 in) meters long, and two smaller moose. The small ones may have been carved several hundred years after the large ones. The large, naturalistic carvings are similar in style and technology to petroglyphs of the Norwegian Nordland coast, and are considered by scientists to be among the oldest rock carvings in Sweden.

Fish traps have been found, and burial mounds from the Late Iron Age. Remains from the Viking era (850-1050) have been found in Bunnerviken and Klocka. Records dividing the lake into fishing concessions date to the late 17th century. There are records of disputes over the boundaries of the concessions and over fishing rights, and indications that at times the lake was over-fished. A settlement was made in 1833. A dispute over fishing rights reached the Supreme Court in 1891, and another Supreme Court ruling on fishing rights was issued in 1912.

Soapstone artifacts have been manufactured around Handöl village and the west of the lake since at least 1600, and this is still an important industry. To the west of Handöl there are open pits in the mountain side that testify to mining operations. Copper ore was extracted for some time in the mid-1700s. Beside Handöl there is a stone monument erected in 1911 to the memory of over 600 Caroleans who were buried at the site on 20 January 1719 during the Carolean Death March. A small timbered chapel was built in 1806 to minister to the Sami from Undersåker and Åre, the oldest such chapel in Jämtland. The pulpit and altar with triptych came from the Frösö church. It also has a tablet commemorating the 600 soldiers who died in 1719.

In 1897 the English Admiral Sir William Robert Kennedy and his brothers came to Ånnsjön, drawn by the fishing and hunting. His family were to stay for the next sixty years. Although foreigners, they were allowed to purchase both property and fishing rights on the lake. In July 1909 the Östersundsposten reported on a "naval battle on Ånnsjön", an altercation between Edward Kennedy and the admiral's daughter Elise (Alice) in one boat, and Olof and Mattias Eriksson from Ånn in another boat. The dispute was over fishing rights in the northeastern part of the lake, and was eventually taken to court.

Today there are a few villages and farms adjacent to Ånnsjön. Ånn, Klocka and Landverk are located on the lake's northern shore. Handöl is in the southwest, while Bränna and Bunnerviken are on the southern shore.

== Environment ==
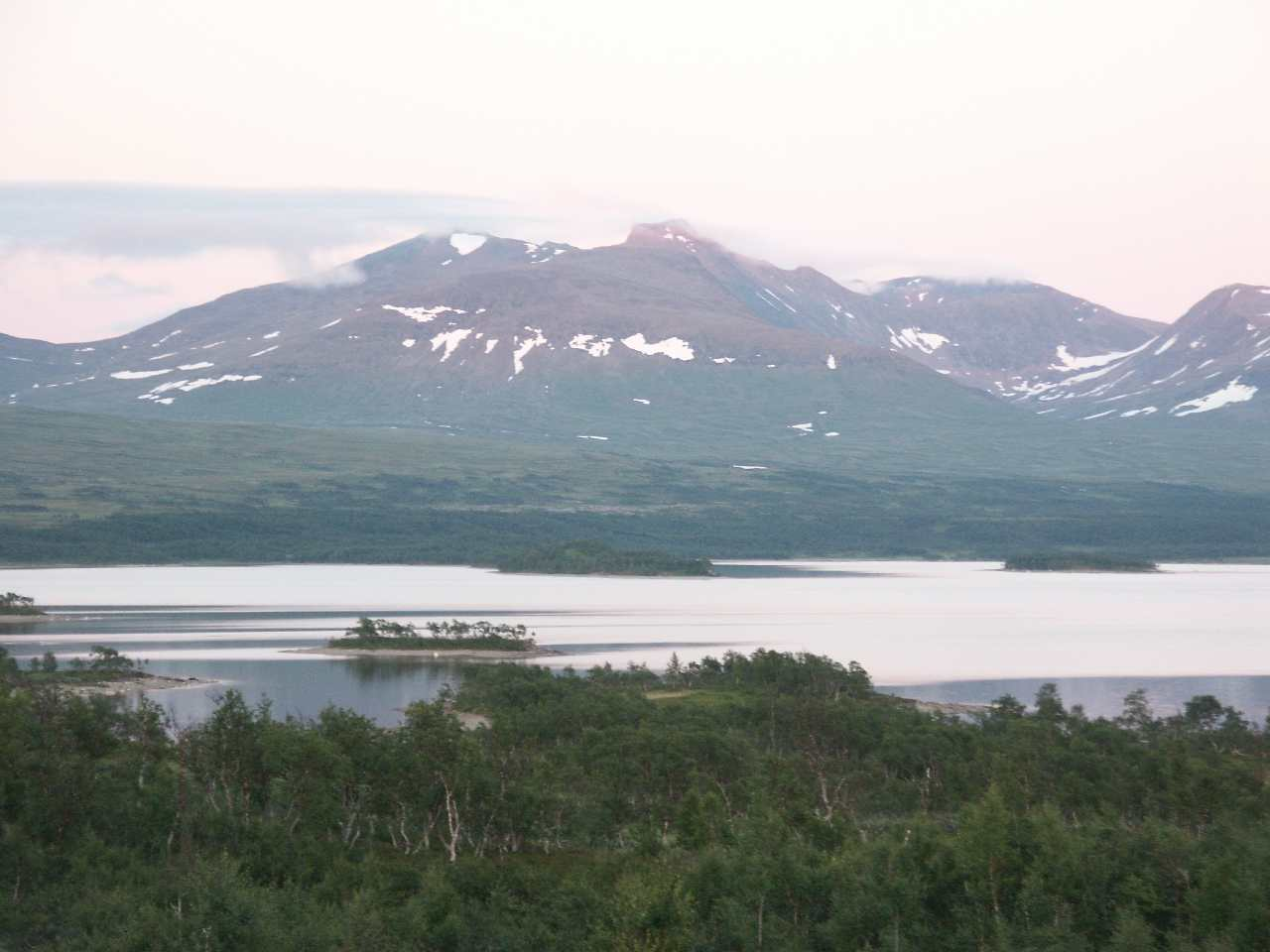
View over Ånnsjön in the summer

The lake islands and surrounding country contain broad leaved deciduous woodland, mixed woodland, coniferous woodland, wooded tundra, grassland and tundra. There are fens, transition mires and springs, rivers and streams and standing freshwater. In the second half of the 19th century the villagers dug drainage ditches in the bogs in the hope of converting them into agricultural or forestry land. The drained peat land contained too much organic matter and was abandoned after a few years, but did not rebound. As of 2013 the county was starting work to reverse the process by cutting down the birch trees and using them to fill the ditches. It was hoped that this would restore much of the partially drained wetlands, with corresponding ecological benefits.

In winter the ice forms quickly on Ånnsjön, and the exposed position keeps snow from accumulating for some time. Even when the ice is thin, the depth along the beaches is only knee-high, so the lake is favored for training by competitive speed and distance skaters. Usually Ånnsjön experiences lemming migrations every four years. Many of the small rodents are picked off by birds as they cross the ice. The lake is well stocked with char and trout, including native trout and Canadian brown trout. Fishing is allowed in designated areas, but a local fishing license is required. The island of Järpön contains the small lake of Renattjärn. This lake has brown trout and char. Fishing is not allowed. Fishing is best in mid summer when insect larvae hatch, but is good in August. Ice fishing is also possible in winter, until May.

Ånnsjön is a Natura 2000 area, and is protected by the European Union Habitats Directive and Birds Directive. Ånnsjön boasts a rich bird life, and is visited by many bird watchers each year. There are signs, paths, a bird watching tower, hides and long boardwalks. The area around Ånnsjön and Storlien is the third largest Important Bird Area (IBA) in Sweden with an area of about 90,000 hectares (220,000 acres). BirdLife International considers Ånnsjön-Storlien an internationally significant area for 26 different species of birds, and of global importance for eleven species that include snipe and ptarmigan.

The lake is home to the near-threatened great snipe (Gallinago media) and vulnerable long-tailed duck (Clangula hyemalis). Other resident or breeding birds include the black grouse, western capercaillie, greater scaup, red-throated loon, Arctic loon, common kestrel, merlin, northern harrier, rough-legged hawk, common crane, Eurasian golden plover, Eurasian dotterel, whimbrel, spotted redshank, common redshank, wood sandpiper, Temminck's stint, purple sandpiper, broad-billed sandpiper, ruff, red-necked phalarope and long-tailed jaeger. The lake has been designated as a Ramsar site since 1974.
