= Storulvån Mountain Lodge =

Mountain lodge in Åre Municipality, Sweden

Coordinates: 63°10′12″N 12°21′48″E

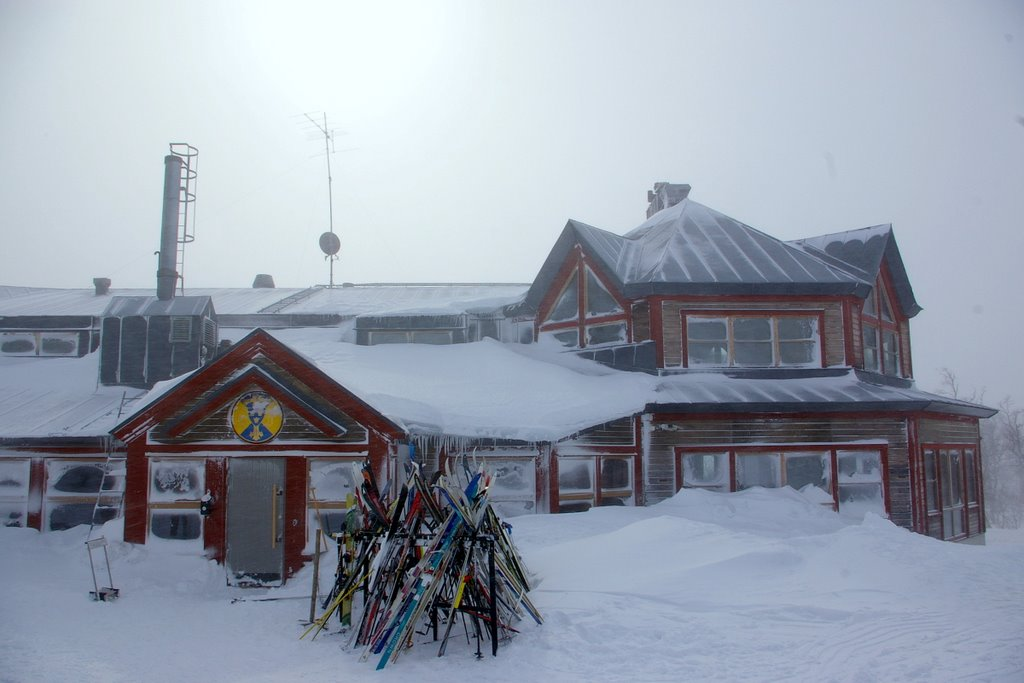
Storulvån

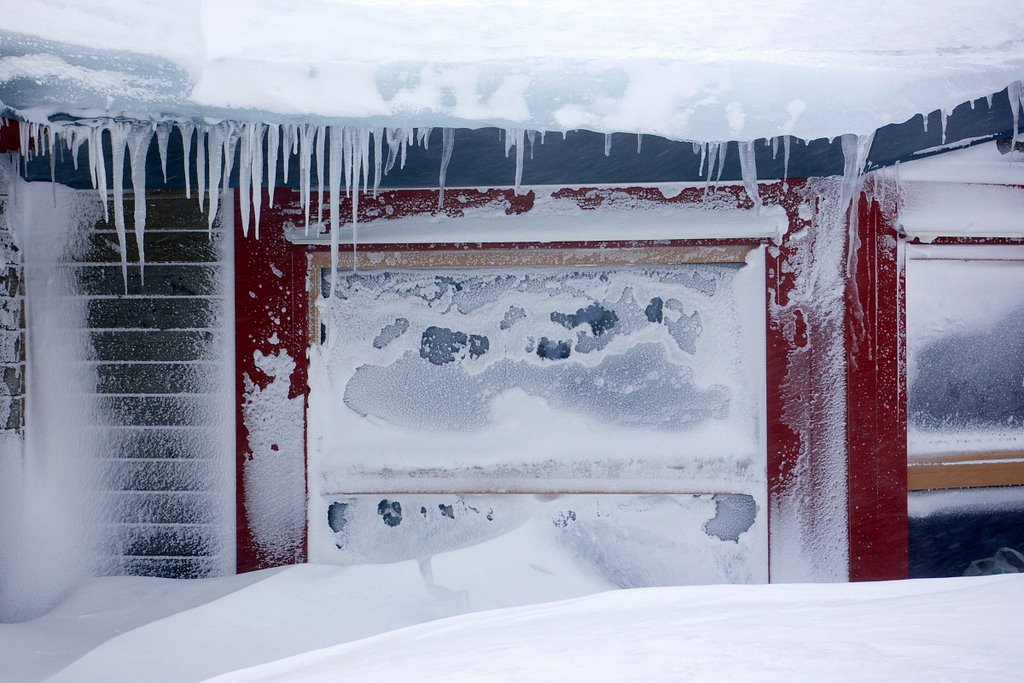
Winter at Storulvån

Storulvån Mountain Lodge (Swedish: Storulvåns fjällstation) is a mountain station in Undersåker parish, Åre Municipality in Jämtland County in western Sweden, belonging to the Swedish Tourist Association (STF). The first building was erected in 1900 as a rest station on the path from Handöl to Sylarna. The Storulvån Lodge has 148 beds and self-catering facilities near the main building, as well as a restaurant and a sauna. Accessible by road (about an hour's drive from Åre), the lodge is a starting point for numerous tours and day trips to nearby mountains including Storsnasen, Getryggen, Tväråklumparna, and Mettjeburretjakke.

== The mountain lodge ==
The mountain lodge was first established over 100 years ago but after the original facility was destroyed by fire in 1987, a new lodge was built in 1989. It is located at a height of 730 m (2,400 ft) above sea level not far from the tree line. Hiking trails lead into the mountains of Jämtland, including Sylarna and Blåhammaren. Depending on the time of year, the lodge is also a good base for skiing on the slopes of Getryggen, for visiting the Mettjeburretjakke caves or for taking a mountain bike trip to the Tjallingen Sami settlement.

== Opportunities for skiing ==
The lodge is a good starting point for ski enthusiasts who are keen to climb the ski slopes themselves. The easily accessible Getryggen mountain is not far away. For those who want a more demanding experience, a trip to the nature reserve around Sylarna is an option while those wanting an easier time can take advantage of the caterpillar-tracked vehicles offering rides to the top of the slopes.

== Literature ==
- Lofterud, Curt (1988). Storulvån, Blåhammaren, Sylarna. Länsstyr. i Jämtlands län.
