= Storsnasen =

Mountain in Sweden

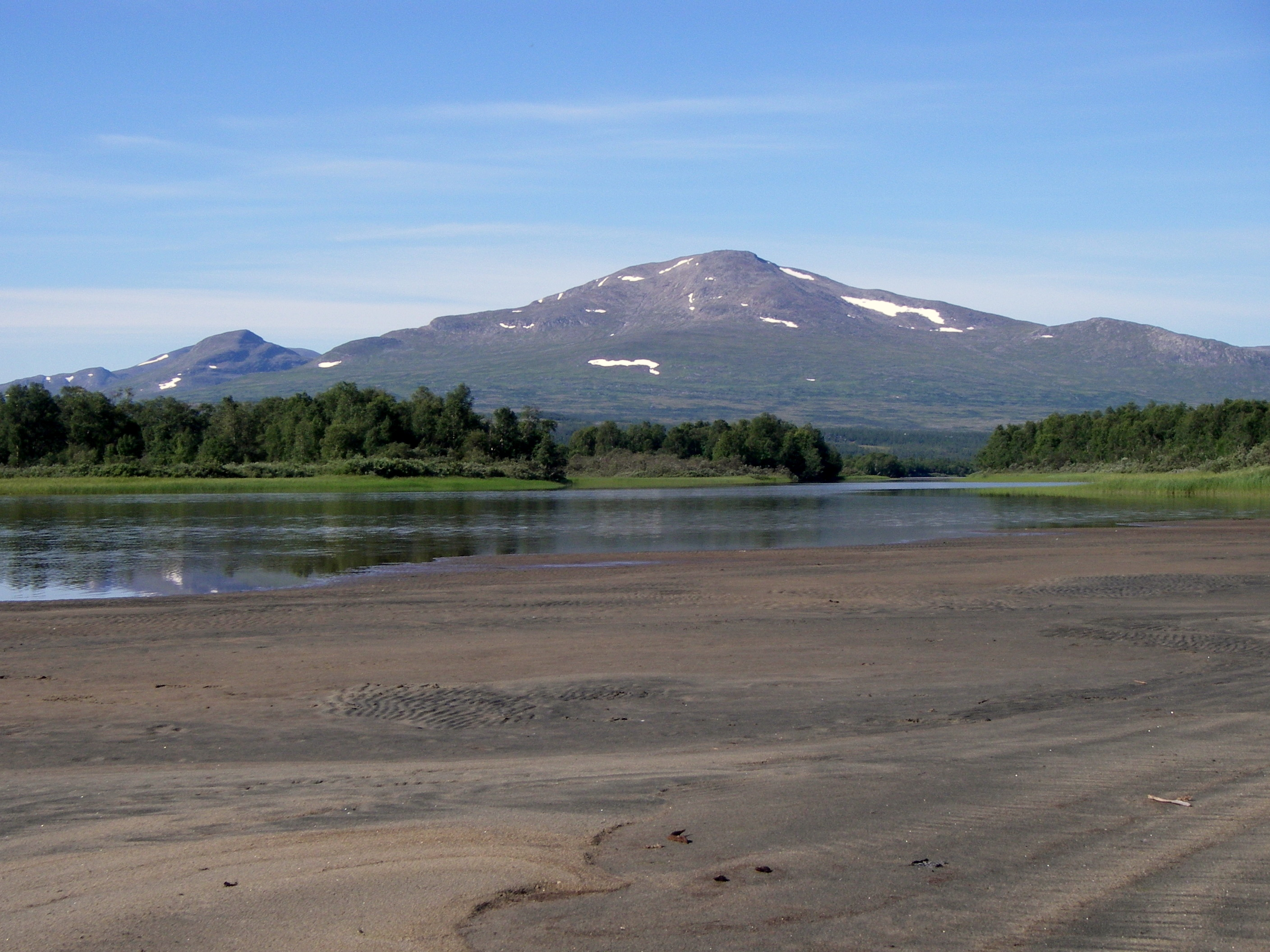
- Storsnasen, July 2007

Highest point
- Elevation: 1,463 m (4,800 ft)
- Prominence: 603 m (1,978 ft)
- Isolation: 13.02 km (8.09 mi) to Västra Bunnerstöten
- Coordinates: 63°13′42″N 12°20′37″E

Geography
- Location within Jämtland
- Location: Jämtland County, Sweden
- Parent range: Snasahögarna

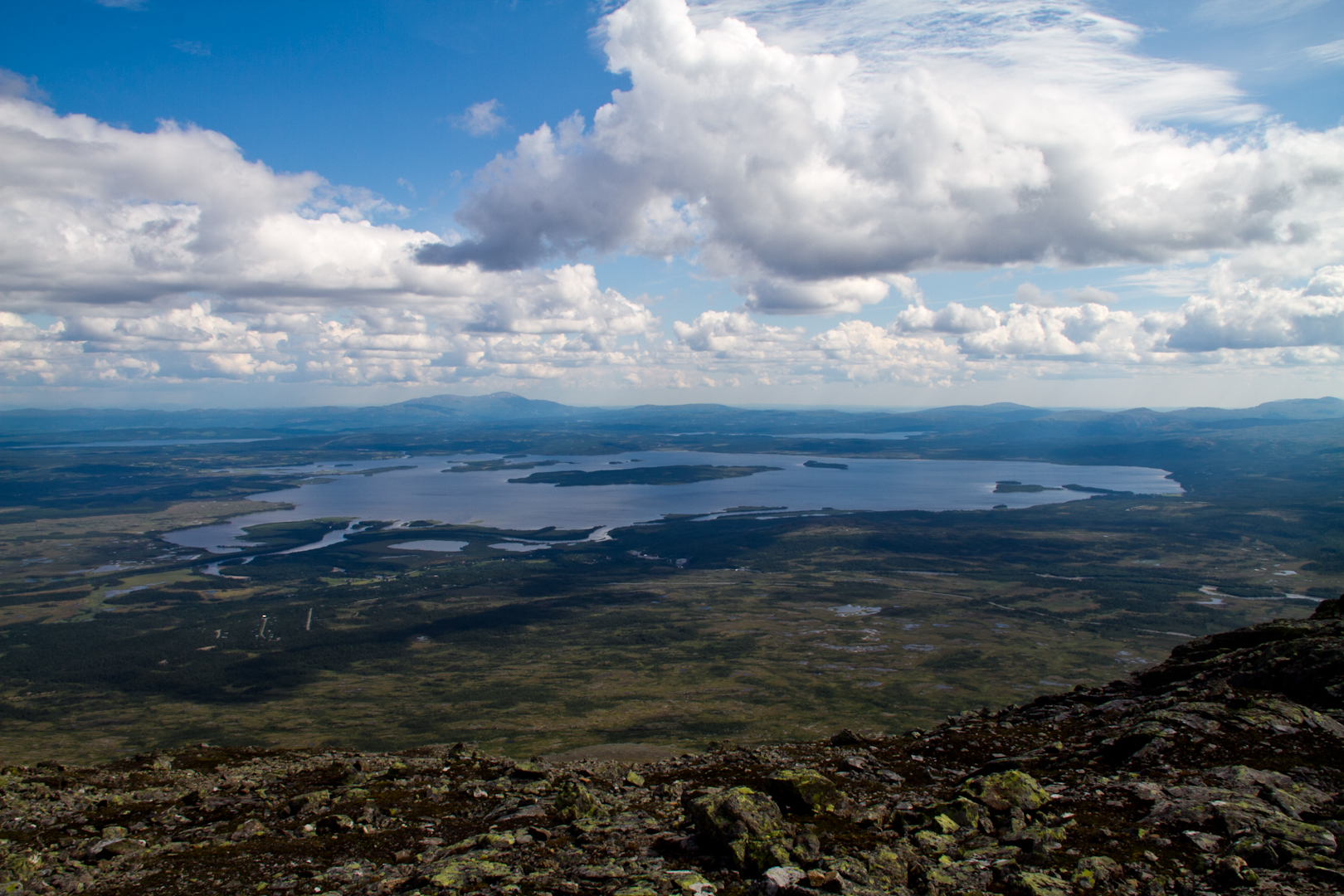
Lake Ånnsjön from the summit of Storsnasen

Storsnasen is a mountain peak in the Snasahögarna mountain range of Jämtland County, western Sweden. The peak is 1,463 metres (4,800 ft) above sea level. Panoramic views of Lake Ånnsjön, which lies to the northeast, can be seen from the summit. The Storulvåns mountain station is to the south.
