= Granön (Jämtland) =

Island in Sweden

- Location within Sweden

Geography
- Coordinates: 63.272256°N 12.563156°E
- Adjacent to: Ånnsjön

Administration
- Sweden
- County: Jämtland County

Demographics
- Population: Uninhabited

Granön is the largest island in lake Ånnsjön in Jämtland County, Sweden.

== Physical ==
Granön lies roughly in the center of Lake Ånnsjön. It is about 3 kilometres (1.9 mi) from east to west, and 1.5 kilometres (0.93 mi) from north to south. The island is low-lying and partially wooded. The lake is generally shallow, but there are depths of up to 40 metres (130 ft) to the south of Granön.

== History ==
Stone Age fishing settlements have been located on the shores of the lake and on the islands of Granön, Årsön and Bunnernäset. In 1906 a large shale tip was found on the island. A settlement was registered on the island in 1834. In the late 19th century the region became popular with English sportsmen. In the 1890s Admiral Sir Houston Stewart leased fishing rights on Granön for three years. In 1905 Admiral Sir William Robert Kennedy bought the island, including the homestead and fishing rights. In 1945 some parts of the fishing rights were assigned to a corporation, allowing use by the local villagers. A fishery was established on the Granön water in 1959 with 18 shareholders. It came to be regulated in terms of number of nets that could be used, restrictions that continue to apply.

== Protection ==
Today Ånnsjön is a Natura 2000 area, and is protected by the European Union Habitats Directive and Birds Directive. However, forestry continues on Granön, since this activity has marginal impact on bird life. Granön contains a shelter that may be used in winter by visitors to the lake. There was a large 2-story hunting lodge on the island, but it burned down in October 2012.

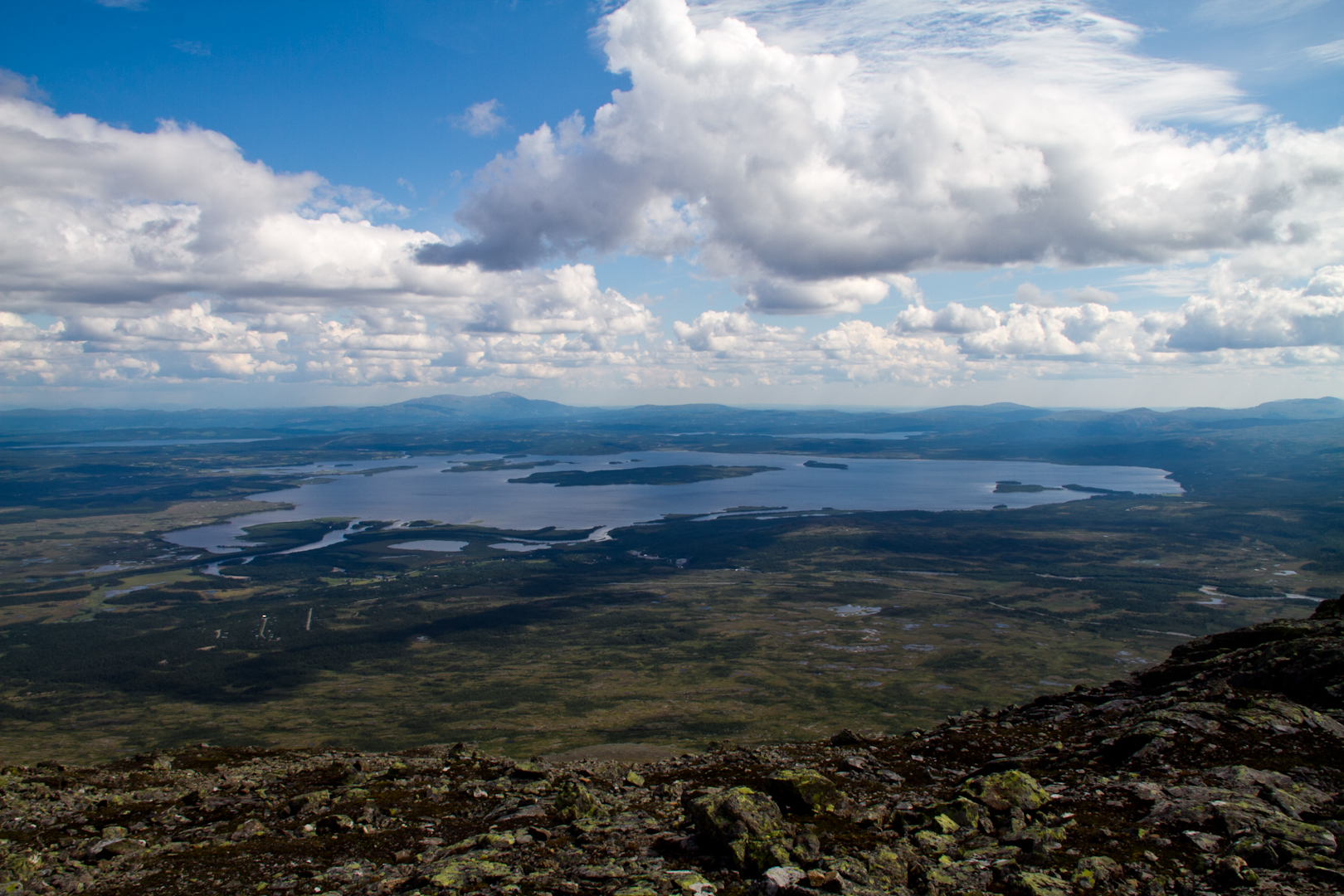
Granön can be seen in the centre of Ånnsjön lake.
