= Pine snake =

Pine snake may refer to:

- Pituophis melanoleucus, a nonvenomous colubrid found in North America
- Lampropeltis g. getula, a.k.a. the eastern kingsnake, a nonvenomous colubrid found in the eastern United States
- Pantherophis vulpinus, or the fox snakes, found in the open forests, prairies, and farmlands of western Michigan, Wisconsin, Minnesota, Illinois, and Iowa
