= Granön, Sundsvall =

Island in the Gulf of Bothnia, Sweden

Granön
- Location within Sweden

Geography
- Coordinates: 62.431788°N 17.539735°E
- Adjacent to: Bay of Bothnia

Administration
- Sweden
- County: Västernorrland County
- Municipality: Sundsvall Municipality

Granön is a small island in the Swedish part of the Gulf of Bothnia, near to the town of Sundsvall. It lies to the east of the larger island of Alnön, which is connected to the mainland by a bridge. Both islands are in the bay where the Indalsälven river empties into the gulf.

The island is mentioned by Matthias Nordal in 1716, who said that in summertime cattle were sometimes transferred from Alnön to Granön, where they would be safe from bears and wolves. Today the island is mostly used for forestry. In 2012 many of the trees were felled by a major storm, Hurricane Dagmar, as were trees on the neighboring islands of Rödön, Brämön and Kalven. SCA Logistics cleared the fallen trees in 2012 and began harvesting the remaining trees in 2013. The wood is loaded onto a barge and transported to the mill in Östrand at the head of the bay. The cleared land is replanted with seedlings.
