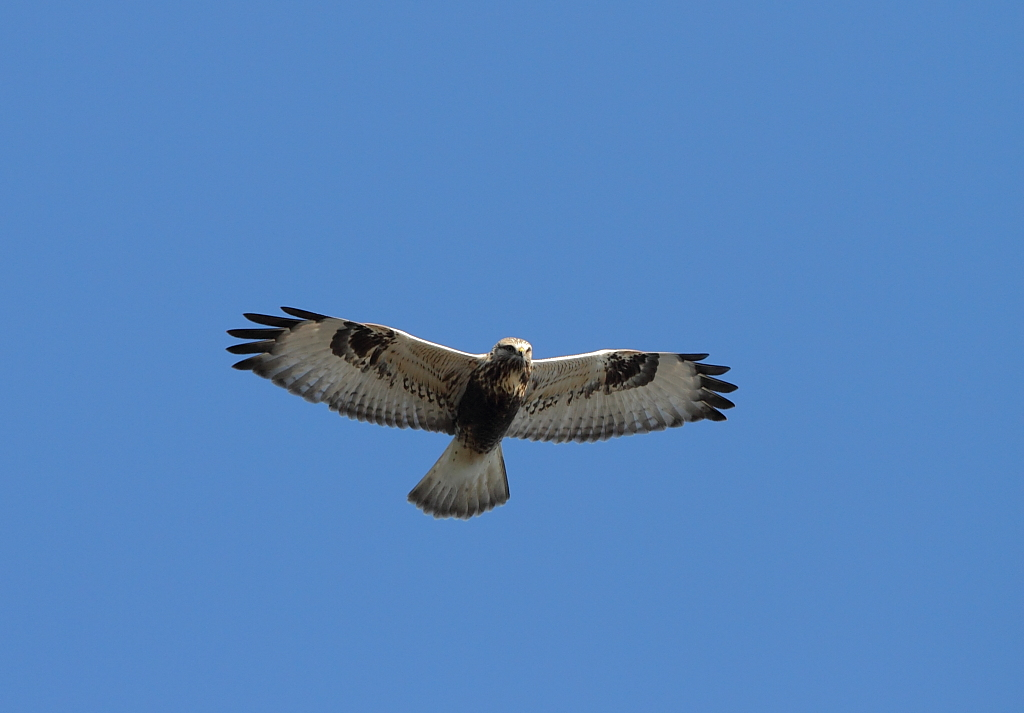
- Buteo lagopus lagopus, Sweden
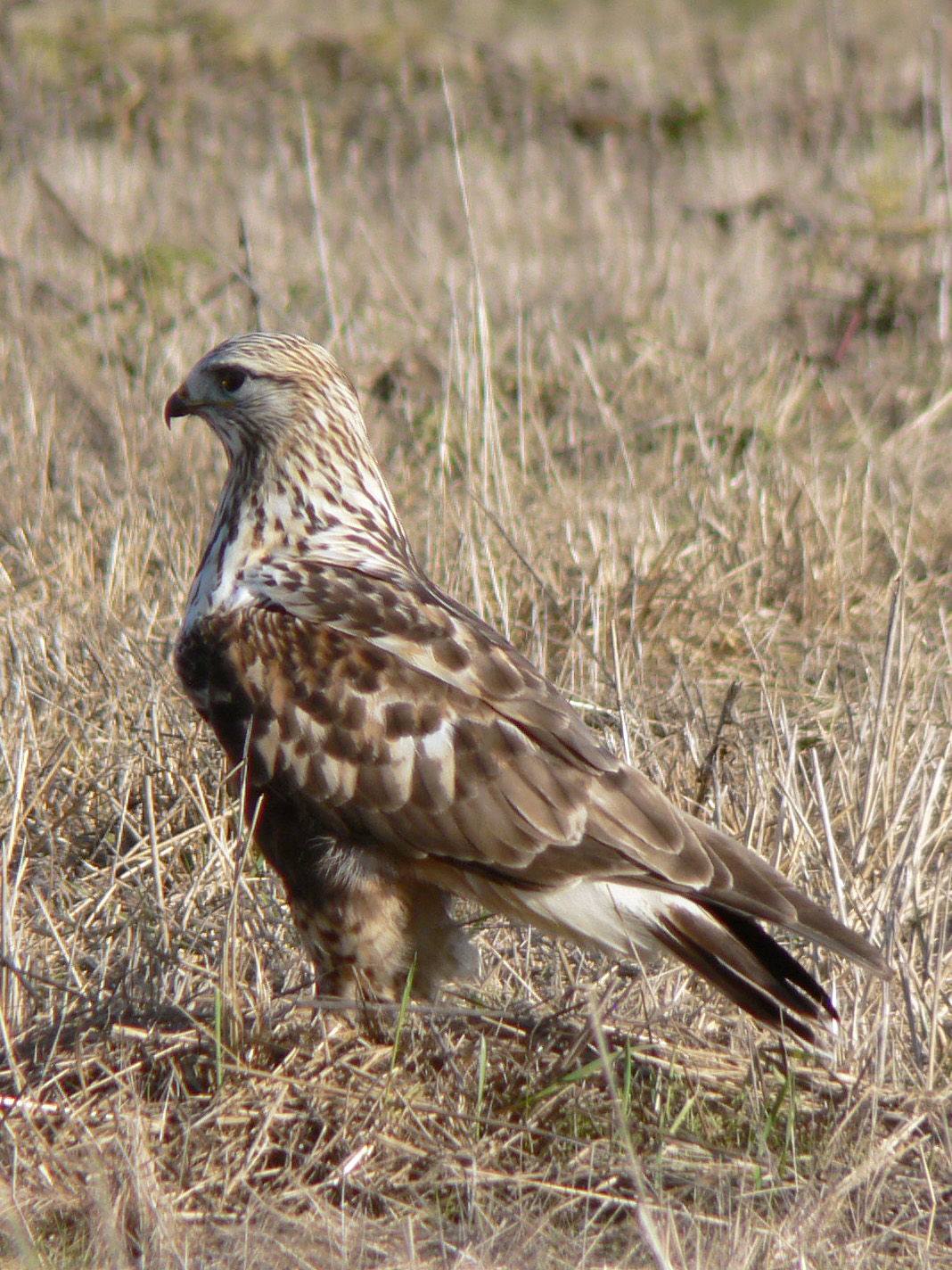
- Buteo lagopus sanctijohannis, Washington State

Conservation status
- Least Concern (IUCN 3.1)

Scientific classification
- Kingdom: Animalia
- Phylum: Chordata
- Class: Aves
- Order: Accipitriformes
- Family: Accipitridae
- Genus: Buteo
- Species: B. lagopus

Binomial name
- Buteo lagopus (Pontoppidan, 1763)

Subspecies
- B. l. lagopus - (Pontoppidan, 1763); B. l. menzbieri - Dementiev, 1951; B. l. kamtschatkensis - Dementiev, 1931; B. l. sanctijohannis - (Gmelin, JF, 1788)
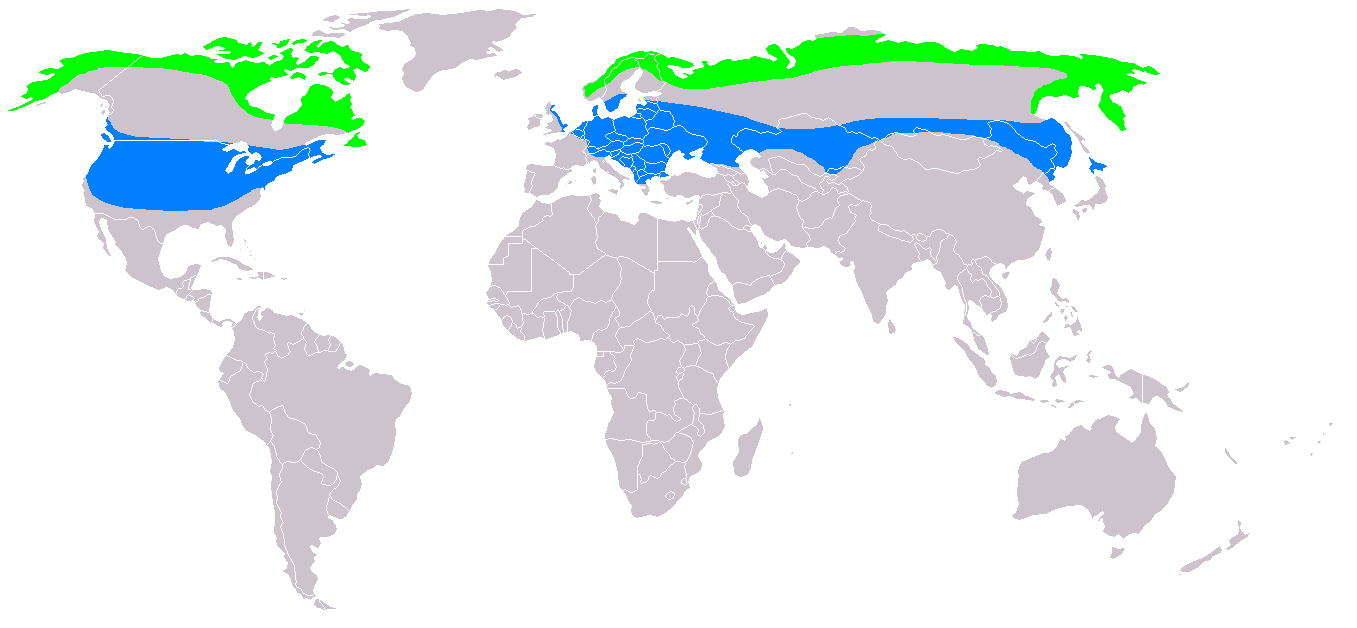
- Range of B. lagopus Summer Winter

= Rough-legged buzzard =

Species of bird

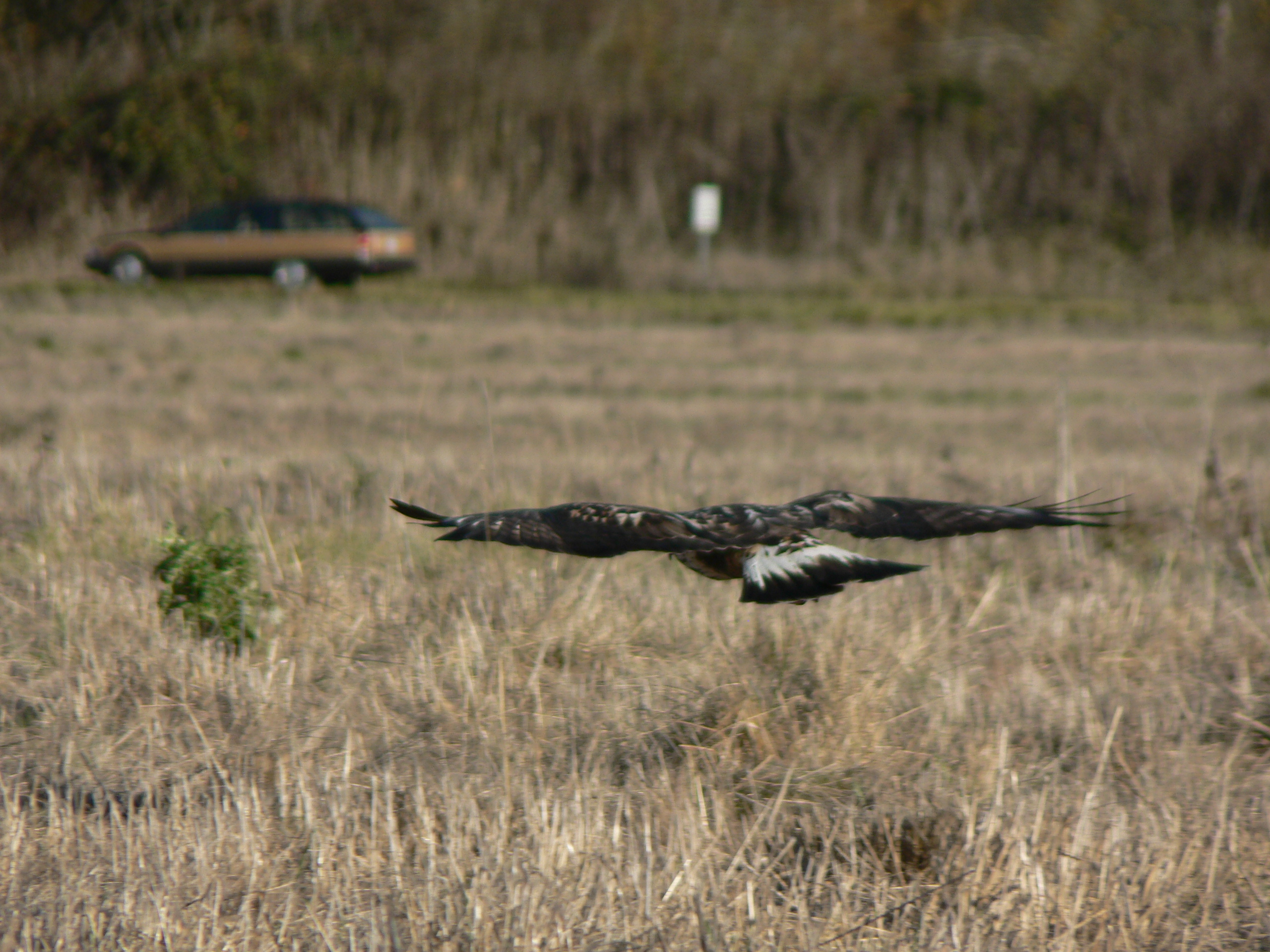
The tail is white with a dark terminal band.

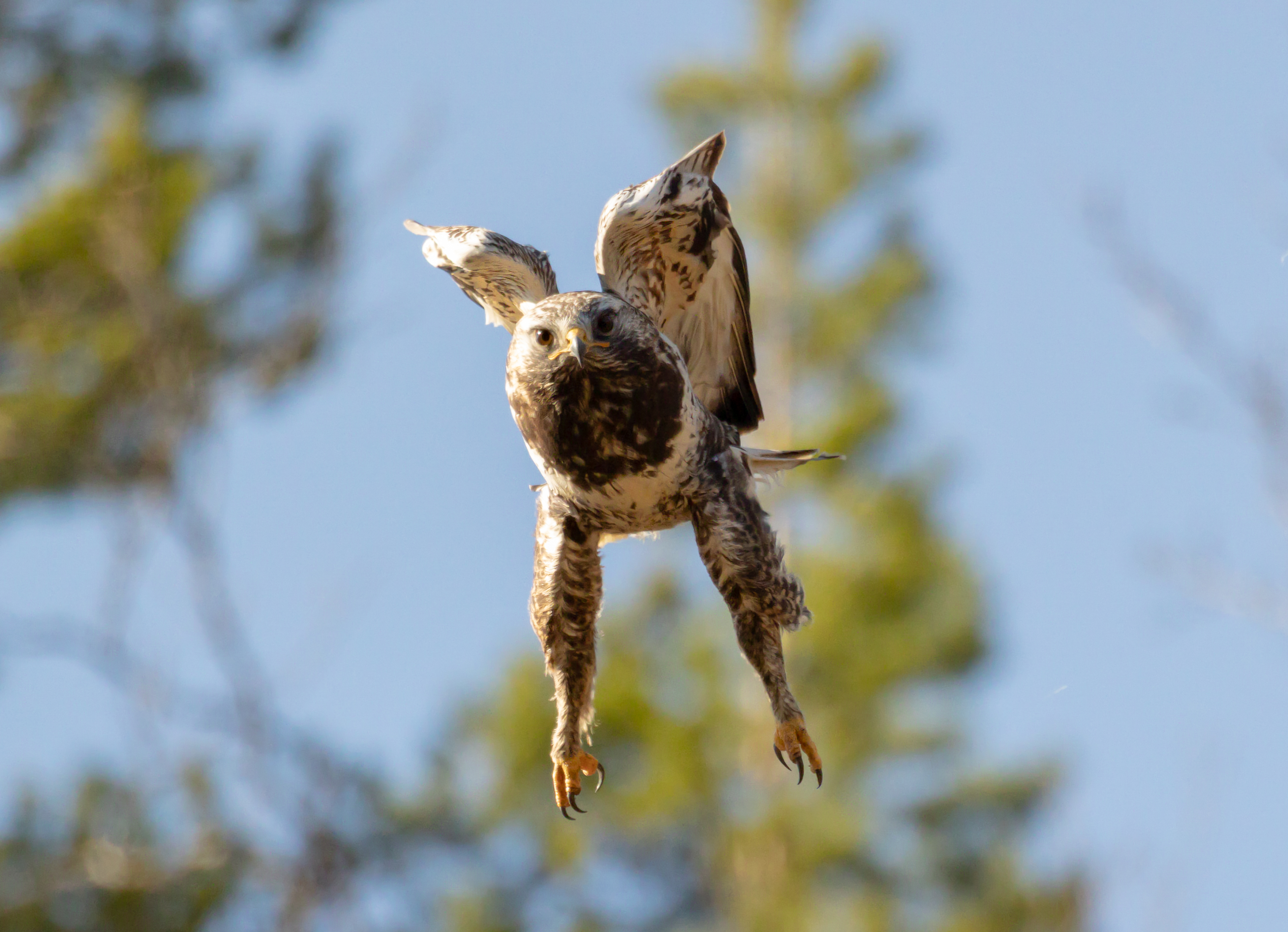
The legs, but not the toes, are feathered.

The rough-legged buzzard (Europe) or rough-legged hawk (North America) (Buteo lagopus) is a medium-large bird of prey. It is found in arctic and subarctic regions of North America, Europe, and Asia during the breeding season, and migrates south for the winter. Historically, it was also known as "rough-legged falcon" in such works as John James Audubon's The Birds of America.

Nests are typically located on cliffs, bluffs or in trees. The clutch sizes are variable with food availability, but usually three to five eggs are laid. They hunt over open land, feeding primarily on small mammals, mainly lemmings and voles. Along with the kestrels, kites, and osprey, this is one of the few birds of prey to hover regularly.

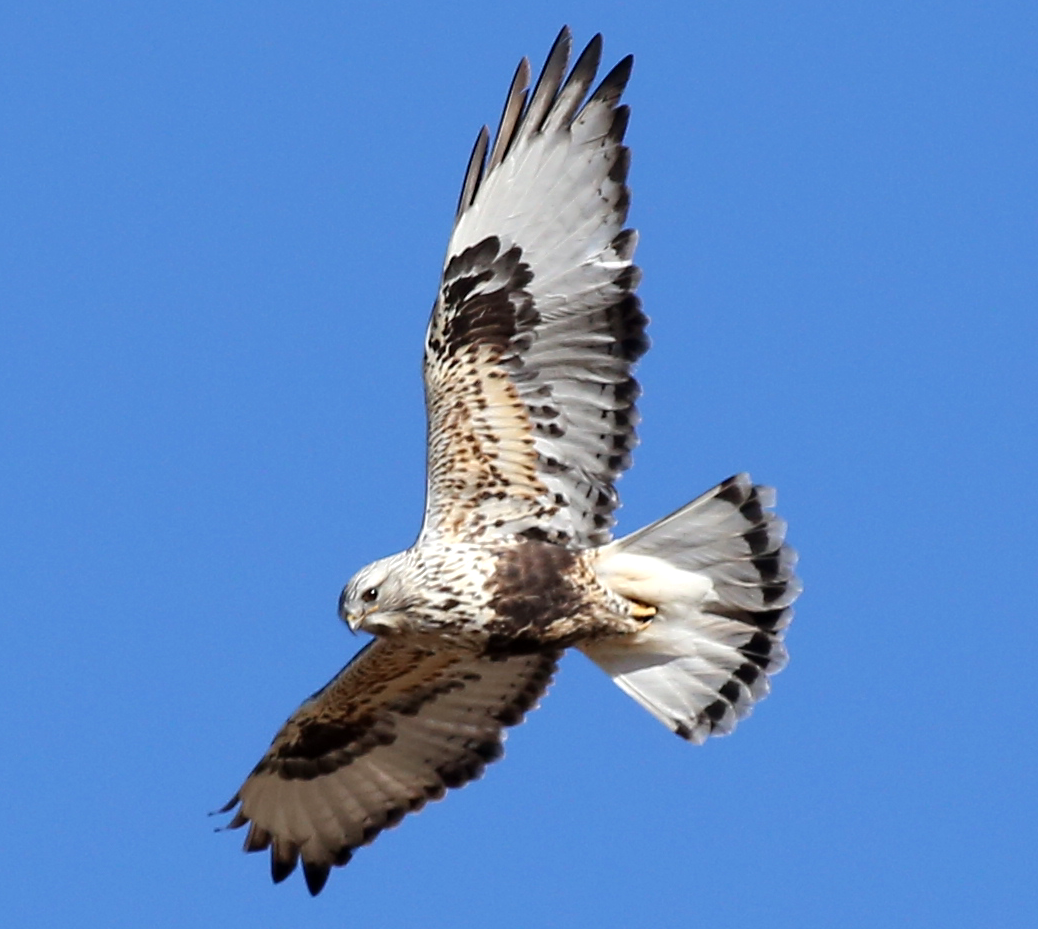
The characteristic dark carpal patches ("dark windows"), belly patch, and tail pattern are clearly visible.

== Description ==
This fairly large raptorial species is 46–68 cm (18–27 in) with wingspan ranging from 120 to 153 cm (47 to 60 in). Individuals can weigh from 600 to 1,660 g (1.32 to 3.66 lb) with females typically being larger and heavier than males. Weights appear to increase from summer to winter in adults, going from an average of 822 to 1,027 g (1.812 to 2.264 lb) in males and from 1,080 to 1,278 g (2.381 to 2.818 lb) in females. Among the members of the genus Buteo, it is sixth heaviest, the fifth longest, and the fourth longest winged. Among standard measurements in adults, the wing chord is 37.2–48.3 cm (14.6–19.0 in), the tail is 18.6–25.5 cm (7.3–10.0 in), culmen is 3.2–4.5 cm (1.3–1.8 in) and the tarsus is 5.8–7.8 cm (2.3–3.1 in). The plumage is predominantly brown and white, and often shows a high degree of speckling. A broad brown chest-band is present in most plumages and a square dark carpal patch contrasting with the white under-wing is an easily identifiable characteristic in light morph individuals. A wide variety of plumage patterns are exhibited in light vs. dark morphs, males vs. females, and adults vs. juveniles. Extensive field experience is required to distinguish between certain plumage variations. Compared to its more common Palearctic and Nearctic cousins, the common buzzard (Buteo buteo) and the red-tailed hawk (Buteo jamaicensis), it is slightly larger, though may be outweighed by the latter.

Its legs are feathered, though not the toes, as an adaptation to cold in its Arctic home range. Its scientific name reflects this feature, as lagopus means "hare-foot". Its talons are relatively small, reflecting their preferred choice of prey.

Distinguishing characteristics in all plumages include long white tail feathers with one or more dark subterminal bands. The wing tips are long enough to reach or extend past the tail when it is perched. The common buzzard can be similar-looking, with a similar long-tailed shape and can be notoriously variable in plumage; rough-legged is longer-winged and more eagle-like in appearance. The red-tailed hawk is chunkier-looking and differs in its darker head, broader, shorter wings, barring on the wings and the tail, dark leading edge to the wings (rather than black wrist patch) and has no white base to the tail. The ferruginous hawk is larger, with a bigger, more prominent bill and has a whitish comma at the wrist and all-pale tail.

It is the only raptor of its size (other than the very different-looking osprey) to regularly hover over one spot, by beating its wings quickly.

== Taxonomy ==
The rough-legged buzzard is a member of the genus Buteo, a group of moderately large raptors exhibiting broad wings, short tails and wide robust bodies. This genus is known as buzzards in Europe but referred to as hawks in North America. The generic name Buteo is the Latin name of the common buzzard (Buteo buteo), and the specific epithet lagopus is derived from Ancient Greek lago (λαγως), meaning "hare", and pous (πους), "foot".

Four subspecies of Buteo lagopus are accepted:

- B. l. lagopus is the nominate subspecies. It breeds in northern Europe and Asia and has relatively dark plumage. The dorsal feathers are a homogeneous brown colour, contrasting well with the paler head.
- B. l. menzbieri breeds in northeastern Asia.
- B. l. kamtschatkensis breeds in Kamchatka. It has paler plumage when compared with B. l. sanctijohannis and it is, on average, the largest of the subspecies.
- B. l. sanctijohannis breeds in North America. It has pale, speckled dorsal plumage and is slightly smaller than B. l. lagopus.

== Habitat and distribution ==
The rough-legged buzzard breeds in tundra and taiga habitats of North America and Eurasia between the latitudes of 61° (locally south to 48° in Newfoundland and 58° N in southern Norway) and 76° N. Those occurring in North America migrate to southern Canada and into the central United States for the winter, while Eurasian birds migrate to central Europe and Asia, with small numbers west to eastern parts of Great Britain; most winter between latitudes of 43° and 58° N. It is the only member of its diverse genus found in all three of the northern continents, having a complete circumpolar distribution. During the winter months, from October to April, preferred habitats include marshes, moorland, prairies and agricultural regions where rodent prey is most abundant.

Breeding sites are usually located in areas with plenty of unforested, open ground. Depending on snow conditions, migrants arrive at breeding grounds during April and May. Home ranges vary with food supply but are commonly reported to be 10–15 km^{2} (3.9–5.8 sq mi) during the winter, but little is known about home ranges during the breeding season. Although frequently attacked in skirmishes by other highly territorial birds such as gyrfalcons and skuas, the rough-legged buzzard is not strongly territorial. However, wintering rough-legged buzzards may behave aggressively towards common buzzards in Sweden, and both species will try to keep the other off a fixed hunting range.

== Behaviour ==
=== Diet ===
This species is carnivorous, typically feeding on small mammals, which make up 62–98% of its diet. Lemmings and voles are the major prey items of this species, seasonally comprising up to 80–90% of their prey but this varies with seasonal availability. Some evidence suggests that they may be able to see vole scent marks which are only visible in the ultraviolet range, allowing them to cue in on prey. Despite generally preying on rodents, a 2015 paper reported the species breeding on rodent-free Kolguev Island in Arctic Russia with goslings as a main prey. In northwest Russia, rough-legged buzzards may feed on small rodents in the years when rodent density is high, and shift to alternative prey (ptarmigans and hares) in the years when small rodents are scarce. The rough-legged buzzard will also supplement its diet with mice, rats, gerbils, pikas, shrews, squirrels of the genera Spermophilus and Tamias, and insects. Besides mammals, birds are the second-most favoured type of prey for rough-legged buzzards. Most avian prey species are small passerines such as snow bunting (Plectrophenax nivalis), Lapland longspur (Calcarius lapponicus), American tree sparrow (Spizelloides arborea) and thrushes (Turdus spp.). However, they will also prey on birds slightly larger than the passerines typically targeted, especially ptarmigan (Lagopus spp.) as well as waterfowl, waders such as dunlin (Calidris alpina) and ruff (Calidris pugnax) and even short-eared owl (Asio flammeus). They usually target young and inexperienced individuals, with relatively large avian prey often being fledglings. When small mammals are scarce, the rough-legged buzzard will also feed on larger, medium-sized mammals, including prairie dogs (Cynomys spp.), ground squirrels, muskrats (Ondatra zibethicus), weasels (Mustela spp.), and up to the size of black-tailed jackrabbits (Lepus californicus). During winter, shrub-steppe habitats seem to encourage a strong dependence on rabbit prey. In developed areas of England, wintering rough-legged buzzards have been recorded preying most regularly on relatively large prey such as common woodpigeon (Columba palumbus) and invasive European rabbits (Oryctolagus cuniculus).

This avian predator hunts opportunistically, occasionally supplementing its diet with carrion but focusing primarily on the most locally abundant small vertebrates. Rough-legged hawks will steal prey from other individuals of the same species as well as other species such as the red-tailed hawk, hen harrier (Circus cyaenus), American kestrel (Falco sparverius) and common raven (Corvus corax). Prey sizes typically range from 6.5–2,587 g (0.23–91.25 oz) and adults require 80–120 g (2.8–4.2 oz) of food daily, around the body mass of the largest species of vole or lemming although most species weigh a bit less. These raptors hunt during the daytime. Like most Buteo species, rough-legged buzzards have been reported both still-hunting (watching for prey from a perch and then stooping) and watching for prey while in flight. Unlike most other large raptors, they may engage in hovering flight above the ground while searching for prey.

=== Activity patterns ===
The length of the activity period of Rough-legged buzzards is strongly influenced by day length, with activity duration increasing as daylight extends. When day length increases from 7.2 to 24 hours, their activity duration expands from 13.1 to 19.0 hours. Consequently, while their total daily energy expenditure rises, the rate of energy expenditure per hour decreases. This allows them, particularly during the Arctic breeding season under polar day conditions, to allocate more energy toward reproduction while maintaining a lower hourly energy expenditure.

At the same time, their activity levels fluctuate throughout the day. Rough-legged buzzards exhibit an increasing activity pattern, meaning that their daytime activity strongly depends on local light conditions, particularly sun elevation. Their activity levels change in sync with the sun's movement, resulting in a season-specific activity slope.

=== Migration ===
Rough-legged buzzard is a migratory raptor that breeds in the Arctic tundra and moves to temperate regions for the winter. Its migration patterns are influenced by food availability, weather conditions, and breeding success. In autumn, Rough-legged buzzards leave their breeding grounds in late September and migrate southward to their wintering areas. This movement is primarily driven by the inaccessibility of small rodents in the Arctic during winter due to continuous snow cover and polar night, during which they are unable to hunt. By late April, they return to their breeding sites.

Their migration follows a distinctive "foxtrot" pattern, characterized by alternating quick and slow phases. The initial quick phase occurs over approximately two weeks, during which the birds cover about 1,500 km. This stage takes them over forested regions, which are largely unsuitable for foraging due to the scarcity of small rodent prey. Upon reaching open landscapes such as grasslands and agricultural fields, their pace slows. The subsequent slow phase extends throughout winter, during which they gradually move southwestward, covering around 1,000 km by midwinter. This movement is primarily influenced by snow accumulation, which limits access to prey. While the quick phase of migration occurs at a speed of approximately 100 km per day, the slow phase is about ten times slower, with birds covering around 10 km per day. In the latter half of winter, Rough-legged buzzards begin their return migration, retracing their route in reverse. The slow phase occurs first, as they move northeastward toward the forest boundary, followed by a rapid flight across the forest zone back to the tundra and forest-tundra regions. However, this pattern varies depending on the breeding and wintering regions, which differ in snow cover dynamics.

During spring migration, Rough-legged buzzards use snow presence as a cue to time their arrival at their breeding grounds. They return to areas that were suitable for breeding in the previous season. This includes sites where they successfully nested the previous year or locations they discovered during prospecting movements following unsuccessful breeding in the previous year. In rare cases, if these areas are no longer viable, they may continue searching for suitable breeding sites in spring before settling.

=== Reproduction ===
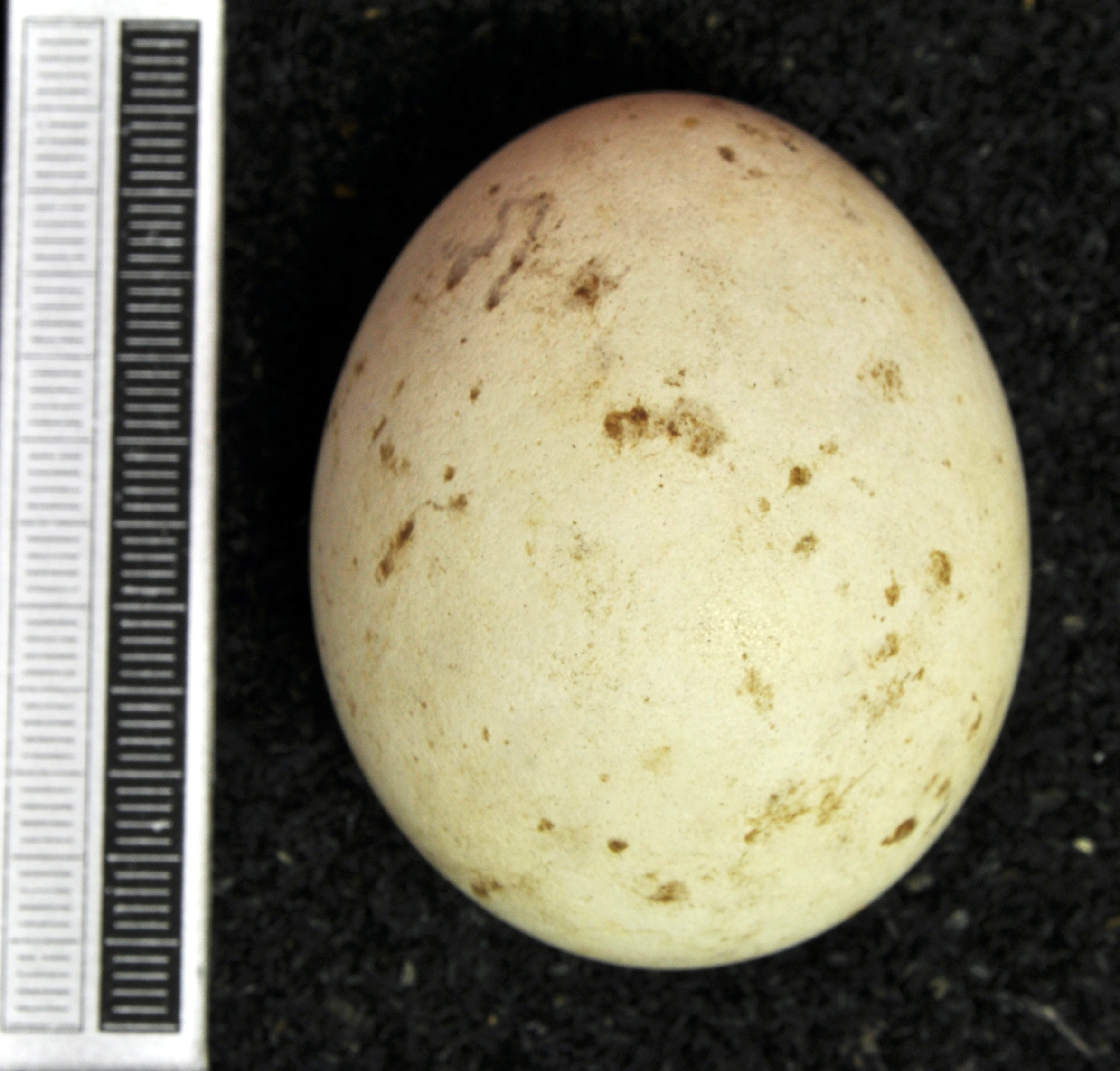
Egg from the Museum Wiesbaden

Sexual maturity is reached at about two years old. Breeding generally occurs during May but is variable depending upon dates of arrival at breeding grounds. The rough-legged buzzard is thought to be monogamous, mating with a single individual for multiple years. No evidence currently suggest otherwise.

Rough-legged buzzards look for suitable nesting territory not in spring, like most migratory birds, but in advance - in autumn. After the breeding season, they make long-distance prospecting flights, look for a suitable habitat with high rodent numbers, and return to that place the following year.

Nests are built soon after arrival to breeding grounds and require 3–4 weeks to complete. Twigs, sedges, and old feathers are used as building materials. Nests are 60–90 cm (24–35 in) in diameter and 25–60 cm (9.8–23.6 in) in height. Cliff ledges and rocky outcroppings are preferred nesting sites. Females can lay 1–7 eggs but will typically lay 3–5. Average egg size is 56.4 mm (2.22 in) in length by 44.7 mm (1.76 in) in width. Minimum incubation period is 31 days, provided almost exclusively by the female. The male feeds the female during this incubation period. After hatching, young require 4–6 weeks before fledging the nest. Fledglings depend on parents to provide food for 2–4 weeks after leaving the nest.

Rough-legged buzzards may nest in association with peregrine falcons (Falco peregrinus). Peregrines chase away small rodent predators from their nesting territory and rough-legged buzzards could use these hot spots as a nesting territory.

=== Longevity and mortality ===
Rough-legged buzzards that survive to adulthood can live to an age of 19 years in the wild; however, perhaps a majority of individuals in the wild do not survive past their first two years of life. The threats faced by young rough-legs can include starvation when prey is not numerous, freezing when Northern conditions are particularly harsh during brooding, destruction by humans, and predation by various animals. The chances of survival increase incrementally both when they reach the fledging stage and when they can start hunting for themselves. Death of flying immatures and adults are often the result of human activity, including collisions with power lines, buildings, and vehicles, incidental ingestion of poison or lead from prey, or illegal hunting and trapping.

Most predation recorded on this species is on the young at the nest. Arctic foxes (Vulpes lagopus), brown bears (Ursus arctos), and wolverines (Gulo gulo) will all eat eggs and young of this species if they are capable of accessing nests on foot. Avian scavengers, especially groups of common ravens, will also readily prey on eggs and nestlings, as will skuas (Stercorarius spp.). Snowy owls (Bubo scandiacus) are a potential predator at the nest as well. Adults, being a large raptorial bird, have fewer natural predators but may die in conflicts, especially if they are defending their own nests, and are occasionally preyed on by other large raptorial birds. Raptors which prey on rough-legged buzzards of most ages at varied times of year may include numerous eagles (especially the golden eagle (Aquila chrysaetos), though also sometimes other Aquila in Eurasia, but only rarely Haliaeetus eagles) as well as large falcons. While wintering, rough-legged buzzards or hawks may be vulnerable to predation by night to Eurasian eagle-owls (Bubo bubo) or great horned owls (Bubo virginianus) and rarely, during day, other large buzzards, including those of their own species.

Besides predation, it could be other reasons for nestling mortality among rough-legged buzzards. Nestlings in their first two weeks have a lousy temperature regulation. In the tundra landscape, they nest on the ground and during hot weather, they could go out of the nest seeking shelter from the sun. If weather then rapidly changes to the thunderstorm (which is common in the Arctic) nestlings could die without parent protection in a short time in 3–5 m from the nest. Other reasons for nestling mortality are earth-slides of the river-banks, where rough-legged buzzards often build their nests, and chilling.

=== Vocalization ===
Adult rough-legged buzzards will give alarm calls when intruders approach a nesting site. It is described as a downward slurring whistle, sounding like kiu wiyuk or a lengthy descending kee-eer similar to that of the red-tailed hawk. This cry is given in flight or from a perch every 15–30 seconds. During courtship, both sexes have been recorded to give a whistling sound that changes to a hiss. Following copulation, females will give a cluck-like sound and males give a whistling noise. Fledglings will give begging calls while waiting for parents to provide food.
