= List of geomyids =

Species in mammal family Geomyidae

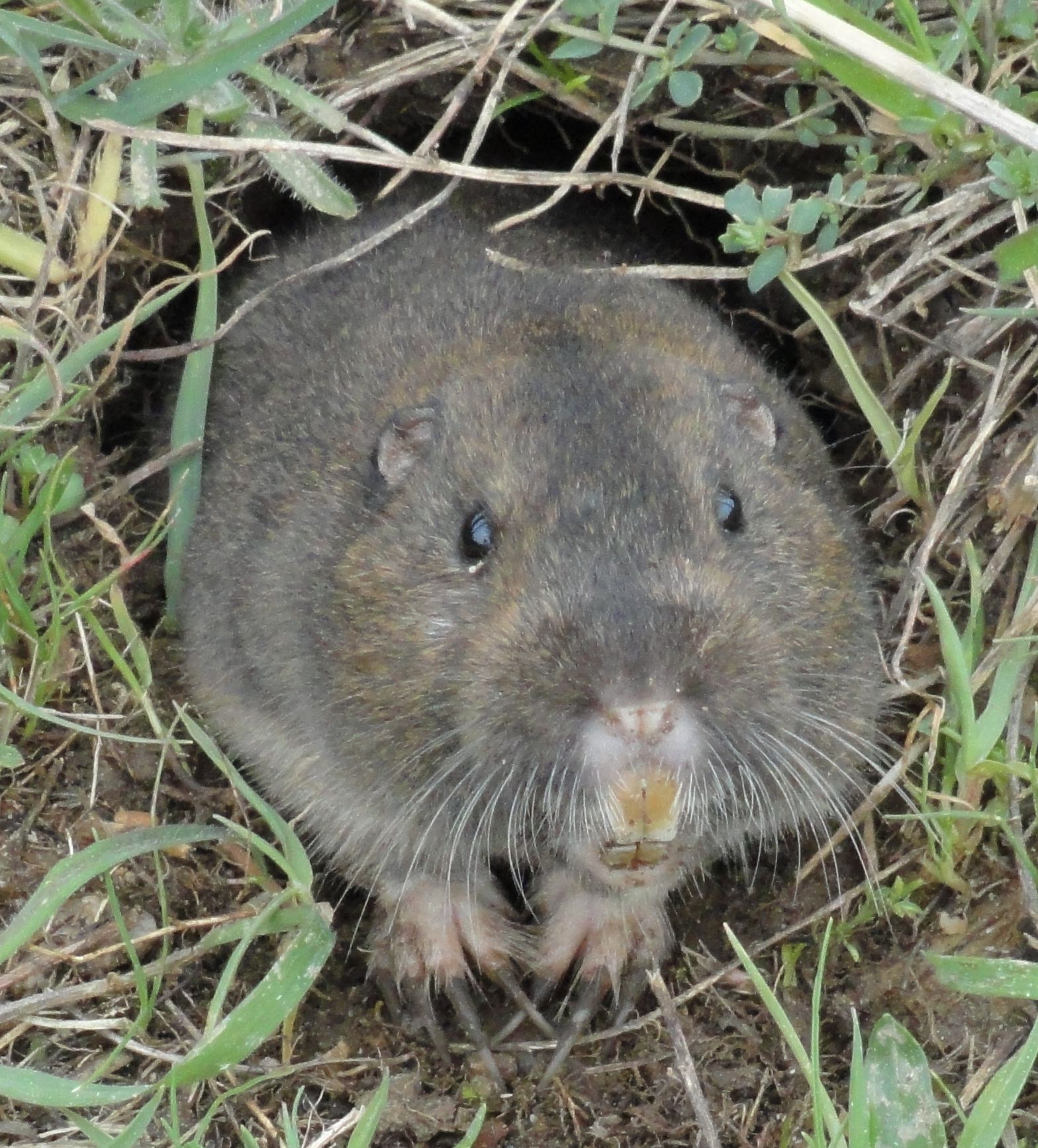
Botta's pocket gopher (Thomomys bottae)

Geomyidae is a family of small mammals in the order Rodentia and part of the Castorimorpha suborder. Members of this family are called geomyids, pocket gophers, or gophers. They are found in North America, Central America, and the northwest tip of South America, primarily in forests, shrublands, and grasslands, though some species can be found in wetlands, deserts, or savannas. They range in size from Botta's pocket gopher, at 8 cm (3 in) plus a 5 cm (2 in) tail, to the giant pocket gopher, at 30 cm (12 in) plus a 14 cm (6 in) tail. Geomyids primarily eat roots, bulbs, and rhizomes, as well as other vegetation. No geomyids have population estimates, though two—the tropical pocket gopher and Michoacan pocket gopher—are categorized as endangered species, and the big pocket gopher is categorized as critically endangered.

The thirty-six extant species of Geomyidae are divided into seven genera, which are not grouped into subfamilies. A few extinct prehistoric geomyid species have been discovered, though due to ongoing research and discoveries, the exact number and categorization is not fixed.

== Conventions ==
IUCN Red List categories
Conservation status
- EX: Extinct (0 species)
- EW: Extinct in the wild (0 species)
- CR: Critically endangered (1 species)
- EN: Endangered (2 species)
- VU: Vulnerable (0 species)
- NT: Near threatened (1 species)
- LC: Least concern (31 species)

Other categories
- DD: Data deficient (1 species)
- NE: Not evaluated (0 species)

The author citation for the species or genus is given after the scientific name; parentheses around the author citation indicate that this was not the original taxonomic placement. Conservation status codes listed follow the International Union for Conservation of Nature (IUCN) Red List of Threatened Species. Range maps are provided wherever possible; if a range map is not available, a description of the geomyid's range is provided. Ranges are based on the IUCN Red List for that species unless otherwise noted.

== Classification ==
Geomyidae is a family consisting of thirty-six extant species in seven genera. These genera are not grouped into subfamilies.

Family Geomyidae

- Genus Cratogeomys (pocket gophers): seven species
- Genus Geomys (eastern pocket gophers): nine species
- Genus Heterogeomys (pocket gophers): three species
- Genus Orthogeomys (taltuzas): six species
- Genus Pappogeomys (Buller's pocket gopher): one species
- Genus Thomomys (smooth-toothed pocket gophers): nine species
- Genus Zygogeomys (Michoacan pocket gopher): one species

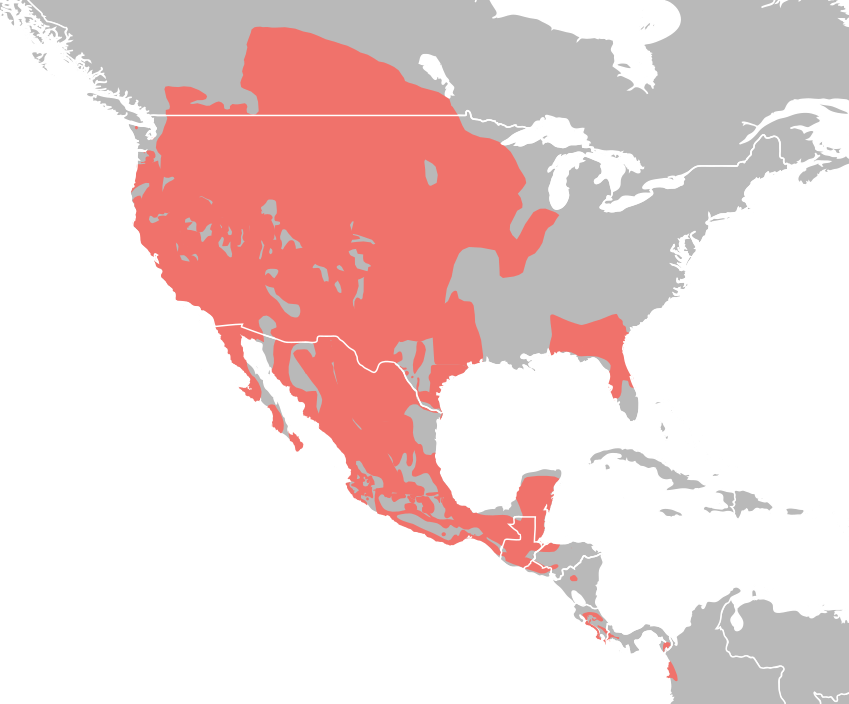
Geomyidae distribution

== Geomyids ==
The following classification is based on the taxonomy described by the reference work Mammal Species of the World (2005), with augmentation by generally accepted proposals made since using molecular phylogenetic analysis, as supported by both the IUCN and the American Society of Mammalogists.

Genus Cratogeomys – Merriam, 1895 – seven species
| Common name | Scientific name and subspecies | Range | Size and ecology | IUCN status and estimated population |
|---|---|---|---|---|
| Goldman's pocket gopher | C. goldmani (Merriam, 1895) Seven subspecies: C. g. elibatus; C. g. goldmani; C. g. maculats; C. g. peridoneus; C. g. planifrons; C. g. rubellus; C. g. subnubilus | Northern Mexico (in blue) | Size: 14–21 cm (6–8 in) long, plus 5–10 cm (2–4 in) tail Habitat: Desert Diet: A variety of roots and vegetation, including cacti | LC Unknown |
| Merriam's pocket gopher | C. merriami (Thomas, 1893) | Central Mexico (in orange) | Size: 20–28 cm (8–11 in) long, plus 8–13 cm (3–5 in) tail Habitat: Forest and grassland Diet: A variety of roots and vegetation, including cacti | LC Unknown |
| Oriental Basin pocket gopher | C. fulvescens Merriam, 1895 | Central Mexico (in yellow) | Size: 18–28 cm (7–11 in) long, plus 8–11 cm (3–4 in) tail Habitat: Forest and grassland Diet: A variety of roots and vegetation, including cacti | LC Unknown |
| Perote pocket gopher | C. perotensis Merriam, 1895 | Central Mexico (in brown) | Size: 20–25 cm (8–10 in) long, plus 8–12 cm (3–5 in) tail Habitat: Forest and grassland Diet: A variety of roots and vegetation, including cacti | LC Unknown |
| Smoky pocket gopher | C. fumosus (Merriam, 1892) | Central Mexico (in green) | Size: 15–28 cm (6–11 in) long, plus 6–11 cm (2–4 in) tail Habitat: Forest and grassland Diet: A variety of roots and vegetation, including cacti | LC Unknown |
| Volcan de Toluca pocket gopher | C. planiceps Merriam, 1895 | Central Mexico (in purple) | Size: 21–28 cm (8–11 in) long, plus 7–11 cm (3–4 in) tail Habitat: Unknown Diet: A variety of roots and vegetation, including cacti | LC Unknown |
| Yellow-faced pocket gopher | C. castanops (Baird, 1852) Eighteen subspecies: C. c. angusticeps; C. c. bullatus; C. c. castanops; C. c. clarkii; C. c. consitus; C. c. dalquesti; C. c. excelsus; C. c. hirtus; C. c. jucundus; C. c. parviceps; C. c. perexiguus; C. c. perplanus; C. c. pratensis; C. c. sordidulus; C. c. subsimus; C. c. surculus; C. c. tamaulipensis; C. c. ustulatus | Southern United States and northern Mexico (in red) | Size: 15–23 cm (6–9 in) long, plus 5–11 cm (2–4 in) tail Habitat: Forest, shrubland, and grassland Diet: A variety of roots and vegetation, including cacti | LC Unknown |

Genus Geomys – Rafinesque, 1817 – nine species
| Common name | Scientific name and subspecies | Range | Size and ecology | IUCN status and estimated population |
|---|---|---|---|---|
| Attwater's pocket gopher | G. attwateri Merriam, 1895 Two subspecies: G. a. ammophilus; G. a. attwateri | Southern United States | Size: 13–18 cm (5–7 in) long, plus 5–7 cm (2–3 in) tail Habitat: Grassland Diet: Roots, rhizomes, and bulbs, as well as other vegetation | LC Unknown |
| Baird's pocket gopher | G. breviceps Baird, 1855 Two subspecies: G. b. breviceps; G. b. sagittalis | Southern United States | Size: 13–16 cm (5–6 in) long, plus 5–7 cm (2–3 in) tail Habitat: Grassland Diet: Roots, rhizomes, and bulbs, as well as other vegetation | LC Unknown |
| Central Texas pocket gopher | G. texensis Merriam, 1895 Three subspecies: G. t. bakeri; G. t. llanensis; G. t. texensis | Southern United States | Size: 12–21 cm (5–8 in) long, plus 5–8 cm (2–3 in) tail Habitat: Shrubland and grassland Diet: Roots, rhizomes, and bulbs, as well as other vegetation | LC Unknown |
| Desert pocket gopher | G. arenarius Merriam, 1895 Two subspecies: G. a. arenarius; G. a. brevirostris | Southwestern United States and northern Mexico | Size: 13–22 cm (5–9 in) long, plus 5–11 cm (2–4 in) tail Habitat: Grassland and desert Diet: Roots, rhizomes, and bulbs, as well as other vegetation | NT Unknown |
| Knox Jones's pocket gopher | G. knoxjonesi Baker & Genoways, 1975 | Southern United States | Size: 11–19 cm (4–7 in) long, plus 5–11 cm (2–4 in) tail Habitat: Grassland Diet: Roots, rhizomes, and bulbs, as well as other vegetation | LC Unknown |
| Plains pocket gopher | G. bursarius (Shaw, 1800) Eight subspecies: G. b. bursarius; G. b. illinoensis; G. b. industrius; G. b. major; G. b. majusculus; G. b. missouriensis; G. b. ozarkensis; G. b. wisconsinensis | Central United States and southern-central Canada | Size: 13–23 cm (5–9 in) long, plus 6–12 cm (2–5 in) tail Habitat: Savanna and grassland Diet: Roots, rhizomes, and bulbs, as well as other vegetation | LC Unknown |
| Southeastern pocket gopher | G. pinetis Rafinesque, 1817 Six subspecies: G. p. austrinus; G. p. colonus; G. p. cumberlandius; G. p. floridanus; G. p. fontanelus; G. p. pinetis | Southeastern United States | Size: 13–24 cm (5–9 in) long, plus 5–12 cm (2–5 in) tail Habitat: Forest and grassland Diet: Roots, rhizomes, and bulbs, as well as other vegetation | LC Unknown |
| Texas pocket gopher | G. personatus True, 1889 Seven subspecies: G. p. davisi; G. p. fallax; G. p. fuscus; G. p. maritimus; G. p. megapotamus; G. p. personatus; G. p. streckeri | Southern United States and northern Mexico | Size: 14–28 cm (6–11 in) long, plus 6–12 cm (2–5 in) tail Habitat: Shrubland and grassland Diet: Roots, rhizomes, and bulbs, as well as other vegetation | LC Unknown |
| Tropical pocket gopher | G. tropicalis Goldman, 1915 | Eastern Mexico | Size: 12–18 cm (5–7 in) long, plus 6–9 cm (2–4 in) tail Habitat: Shrubland and grassland Diet: Roots, rhizomes, and bulbs, as well as other vegetation | EN Unknown |

Genus Heterogeomys – Le Conte, 1852 – three species
| Common name | Scientific name and subspecies | Range | Size and ecology | IUCN status and estimated population |
|---|---|---|---|---|
| Big pocket gopher | H. lanius Elliot, 1905 | Central Mexico (in green, in box) | Size: 25–29 cm (10–11 in) long, plus 9–10 cm (4–4 in) tail Habitat: Forest Diet: A variety of vegetation | CR Unknown |
| Cherrie's pocket gopher | H. cherriei Allen, 1893 Four subspecies: H. c. carlosensis; H. c. cherriei; H. c. costaricensis; H. c. matagalpae (Nicaraguan pocket gopher) | Nicaragua and Costa Rica (in red) | Size: 18–25 cm (7–10 in) long, plus 8–11 cm (3–4 in) tail Habitat: Forest Diet: A variety of vegetation | LC Unknown |
| Darien pocket gopher | H. dariensis (Goldman, 1912) Two subspecies: H. d. dariensis; H. d. thaeleri (Thaeler's pocket gopher) | Panama and Colombia (in blue) | Size: 21–28 cm (8–11 in) long, plus 12–14 cm (5–6 in) tail Habitat: Forest Diet: A variety of vegetation | LC Unknown |

Genus Orthogeomys – Merriam, 1895 – six species
| Common name | Scientific name and subspecies | Range | Size and ecology | IUCN status and estimated population |
|---|---|---|---|---|
| Chiriqui pocket gopher | O. cavator (Bangs, 1902) Three subspecies: O. c. cavator; O. c. nigrescens; O. c. pansa | Costa Rica and Panama (in brown) | Size: 22–27 cm (9–11 in) long, plus 11–13 cm (4–5 in) tail Habitat: Forest Diet: A variety of vegetation | LC Unknown |
| Giant pocket gopher | O. grandis (Thomas, 1893) Sixteen subspecies: O. g. alleni; O. g. alvarezi; O. g. annexus; O. g. carbo; O. g. engelhardi; O. g. felipensis; O. g. grandis; O. g. guerrerensis; O. g. huixtlae; O. g. latifrons; O. g. nelsoni; O. g. pluto; O. g. pygacanthus; O. g. scalops; O. g. soconuscensis; O. g. vulcani | Southern Mexico and Central America (in blue) | Size: 22–30 cm (9–12 in) long, plus 9–14 cm (4–6 in) tail Habitat: Forest Diet: A variety of vegetation | LC Unknown |
| Hispid pocket gopher | O. hispidus (Le Conte, 1852) Twelve subspecies: O. h. cayoensis; O. h. chiapensis; O. h. concavus; O. h. hispidus; O. h. hondurensis; O. h. isthmicus; O. h. latirostris; O. h. negatus; O. h. teapensis; O. h. tehuantepecus; O. h. torridus; O. h. yucantanensis | Eastern Mexico and Central America (in red) | Size: 21–27 cm (8–11 in) long, plus 7–9 cm (3–4 in) tail Habitat: Forest and intertidal marine Diet: A variety of vegetation | LC Unknown |
| Oaxacan pocket gopher | O. cuniculus (Elliot, 1905) | Southern Mexico (in yellow, in box) | Size: 22–30 cm (9–12 in) long, plus 9–14 cm (4–6 in) tail Habitat: Forest Diet: A variety of vegetation | DD Unknown |
| Underwood's pocket gopher | O. underwoodi (Osgood, 1931) | Costa Rica and Panama (in green) | Size: 18–21 cm (7–8 in) long, plus 8–11 cm (3–4 in) tail Habitat: Forest Diet: A variety of vegetation | LC Unknown |
| Variable pocket gopher | O. heterodus (Peters, 1865) Three subspecies: O. h. cartagoensis; O. h. dolichocephalus; O. h. heterodus | Costa Rica (in purple) | Size: 22–27 cm (9–11 in) long, plus 8–12 cm (3–5 in) tail Habitat: Forest and grassland Diet: A variety of vegetation | LC Unknown |

Genus Pappogeomys – Merriam, 1895 – one species
| Common name | Scientific name and subspecies | Range | Size and ecology | IUCN status and estimated population |
|---|---|---|---|---|
| Buller's pocket gopher | P. bulleri (Thomas, 1892) Nine subspecies: P. b. albinasus; P. b. alcorni (Alcorn's pocket gopher); P. b. amecensis; P. b. bulleri; P. b. burti; P. b. infuscus; P. b. lutulentus; P. b. melanurus; P. b. nayaritensis | Western-central Mexico | Size: 12–18 cm (5–7 in) long, plus 6–10 cm (2–4 in) tail Habitat: Forest, shrubland, and grassland Diet: Roots and other vegetation | LC Unknown |

Genus Thomomys – Wied-Neuwied, 1839 – nine species
| Common name | Scientific name and subspecies | Range | Size and ecology | IUCN status and estimated population |
|---|---|---|---|---|
| Botta's pocket gopher | T. bottae (Eydoux & Gervais, 1836) Many subspecies: T. b. abbotti; T. b. abstrusus; T. b. actuosus; T. b. albatus; T. b. albicaudatus; T. b. alexandrae; T. b. alpinus; T. b. alticolus; T. b. analogus; T. b. angustidens; T. b. anitae; T. b. aphrastus; T. b. aureiventris; T. b. aureus; T. b. awahnee; T. b. baileyi; T. b. basilicae; T. b. birdseyei; T. b. bonnevillei; T. b. borjasensis; T. b. bottae; T. b. brazierhowelli; T. b. brevidens; T. b. cactophilus; T. b. camoae; T. b. canus; T. b. catalinae; T. b. catavinensis; T. b. centralis; T. b. cervinus; T. b. chrysonotus; T. b. cinereus; T. b. collis; T. b. concisor; T. b. confinalis; T. b. connectens; T. b. contractus; T. b. convergens; T. b. convexus; T. b. cultellus; T. b. cunicularius; T. b. curtatus; T. b. depressus; T. b. desertorum; T. b. detumidus; T. b. dissimilis; T. b. divergens; T. b. estanciae; T. b. fulvus; T. b. fumosus; T. b. guadalupensis; T. b. homorus; T. b. howelli; T. b. humilis; T. b. imitabilis; T. b. incomptus; T. b. internatus; T. b. jojobae; T. b. juarezensis; T. b. lachuguilla; T. b. lacrymalis; T. b. laticeps; T. b. latus; T. b. lenis; T. b. leucodon; T. b. levidensis; T. b. limitaris; T. b. limpiae; T. b. litoris; T. b. lucidus; T. b. lucrificus; T. b. magdalenae; T. b. martirensis; T. b. mearnsi; T. b. mewa; T. b. minimus; T. b. modicus; T. b. morulus; T. b. nanus; T. b. navus; T. b. neglectus; T. b. nesophilus; T. b. nigricans; T. b. operarius; T. b. optabilis; T. b. opulentus; T. b. osgoodi; T. b. paguatae; T. b. pascalis; T. b. pectoralis; T. b. peramplus; T. b. perditus; T. b. perpallidus; T. b. pervagus; T. b. pervarius; T. b. phelleoecus; T. b. pinalensis; T. b. planirostris; T. b. planorum; T. b. powelli; T. b. proximarinus; T. b. pusillus; T. b. retractus; T. b. rhizophagus; T. b. riparius; T. b. robustus; T. b. rubidus; T. b. ruidosae; T. b. rupestris; T. b. ruricola; T. b. russeolus; T. b. saxatilis; T. b. scotophilus; T. b. sevieri; T. b. siccovallis; T. b. simulus; T. b. sinaloae; T. b. solitarius; T. b. spatiosus; T. b. stansburyi; T. b. sturgisi; T. b. subsimilis; T. b. texensis; T. b. tivius; T. b. toltecus; T. b. tularosae; T. b. vanrosseni; T. b. varus; T. b. vescus; T. b. villai; T. b. wahwahensis; T. b. winthropi; T. b. xerophilus | Southwestern United States and northern Mexico | Size: 8–20 cm (3–8 in) long, plus 5–10 cm (2–4 in) tail Habitat: Forest, grassland, and desert Diet: Roots, bulbs, leaves, and other vegetation | LC Unknown |
| Camas pocket gopher | T. bulbivorus (Richardson, 1829) | Northwestern United States | Size: 20–24 cm (8–9 in) long, plus 8–10 cm (3–4 in) tail Habitat: Grassland Diet: Roots, bulbs, leaves, and other vegetation | LC Unknown |
| Idaho pocket gopher | T. idahoensis Merriam, 1901 Three subspecies: T. i. confinus; T. i. idahoensis; T. i. pygmaeus | Northwestern United States | Size: 12–15 cm (5–6 in) long, plus 4–7 cm (2–3 in) tail Habitat: Savanna, shrubland, and grassland Diet: Roots, bulbs, leaves, and other vegetation | LC Unknown |
| Mazama pocket gopher | T. mazama Merriam, 1897 Fifteen subspecies: T. m. couchi; T. m. glacialis; T. m. helleri; T. m. hesperus; T. m. louiei; T. m. mazama; T. m. melanops; T. m. nasicus; T. m. niger; T. m. oregonus; T. m. premaxillaris; T. m. pugetensis; T. m. tacomensis (Tacoma pocket gopher); T. m. tumuli; T. m. yelmensis | Northwestern United States | Size: 14–17 cm (6–7 in) long, plus 5–8 cm (2–3 in) tail Habitat: Forest, savanna, shrubland, and grassland Diet: Roots, bulbs, leaves, and other vegetation | LC Unknown |
| Mountain pocket gopher | T. monticola Allen, 1893 | Western United States | Size: 12–16 cm (5–6 in) long, plus 5–9 cm (2–4 in) tail Habitat: Forest and grassland Diet: Roots, bulbs, leaves, and other vegetation | LC Unknown |
| Northern pocket gopher | T. talpoides (Richardson, 1828) 54 subspecies: T. t. aequalidens; T. t. agrestis; T. t. andersoni; T. t. attenuatus; T. t. bridgeri; T. t. bullatus; T. t. caryi; T. t. cheyennensis; T. t. cognatus; T. t. columbianus; T. t. devexus; T. t. douglasii; T. t. duranti; T. t. falcifer; T. t. fisheri; T. t. fossor; T. t. fuscus; T. t. gracilis; T. t. immunis; T. t. incensus; T. t. kaibabensis; T. t. kelloggi; T. t. levis; T. t. limosus; T. t. loringi; T. t. macrotis; T. t. medius; T. t. meritus; T. t. monoensis; T. t. moorei; T. t. nebulosus; T. t. ocius; T. t. oquirrhensis; T. t. parowanensis; T. t. pierreicolus; T. t. pryori; T. t. quadratus; T. t. ravus; T. t. relicinus; T. t. retrorsus; T. t. rostralis; T. t. rufescens; T. t. saturatus; T. t. segregatus; T. t. shawi; T. t. talpoides; T. t. taylori; T. t. tenellus; T. t. trivialis; T. t. uinta; T. t. wallowa; T. t. wasatchensis; T. t. whitmani; T. t. yakimensis | Northwestern United States and southwestern Canada | Size: 11–19 cm (4–7 in) long, plus 5–8 cm (2–3 in) tail Habitat: Forest and grassland Diet: Roots, bulbs, leaves, and other vegetation | LC Unknown |
| Southern pocket gopher | T. umbrinus (Richardson, 1829) 25 subspecies: T. u. arriagensis; T. u. atrodorsalis; T. u. atrovarius; T. u. camargensis; T. u. chihuahuae; T. u. crassidens; T. u. durangi; T. u. emotus; T. u. enixus; T. u. eximius; T. u. extimus; T. u. goldmani; T. u. intermedius; T. u. juntae; T. u. musculus; T. u. nelsoni; T. u. newmani; T. u. parviceps; T. u. potosinus; T. u. pullus; T. u. sonoriensis; T. u. supernus; T. u. umbrinus; T. u. zacatecae; Thomomys | Southwestern United States and Mexico | Size: 12–18 cm (5–7 in) long, plus 5–8 cm (2–3 in) tail Habitat: Forest, shrubland, grassland, and desert Diet: Roots, bulbs, leaves, and other vegetation | LC Unknown |
| Townsend's pocket gopher | T. townsendii (Bachman, 1839) Two subspecies: T. t. nevadensis; T. t. townsendii | Western United States | Size: 14–23 cm (6–9 in) long, plus 5–10 cm (2–4 in) tail Habitat: Shrubland, grassland, and inland wetlands Diet: Roots, bulbs, leaves, and other vegetation | LC Unknown |
| Wyoming pocket gopher | T. clusius Coues, 1875 | Western-central United States | Size: 10–13 cm (4–5 in) long, plus 5–7 cm (2–3 in) tail Habitat: Shrubland Diet: Roots, bulbs, leaves, and other vegetation | LC Unknown |

Genus Zygogeomys – Merriam, 1895 – one species
| Common name | Scientific name and subspecies | Range | Size and ecology | IUCN status and estimated population |
|---|---|---|---|---|
| Michoacan pocket gopher | Z. trichopus Merriam, 1895 | Central Mexico | Size: 17–24 cm (7–9 in) long, plus 6–10 cm (2–4 in) tail Habitat: Forest Diet: Roots and rhizomes | EN Unknown |

== Sources ==
- Chernasky, Amy; Motis, Anna; Burgin, Connor, eds. (2023). All the Mammals of the World. Lynx Nature Books. ISBN 978-84-16728-66-4.
- Nowak, Ronald M. (1999). Walker's Mammals of the World. Vol. 2 (6th ed.). Johns Hopkins University Press. ISBN 978-0-8018-5789-8.
- Patton, James L. (2005). Wilson, Don E.; Reeder, DeeAnn M. (eds.). Mammal Species of the World. Vol. 2 (3rd ed.). Johns Hopkins University Press. ISBN 978-0-8018-8221-0.
