= Alcorn's pocket gopher =

Conservation status
- Critically Endangered (IUCN 3.1)

Scientific classification
- Kingdom: Animalia
- Phylum: Chordata
- Class: Mammalia
- Order: Rodentia
- Family: Geomyidae
- Genus: Pappogeomys
- Species: P. bulleri
- Subspecies: P. b. alcorni

Trinomial name
- Pappogeomys bulleri alcorni Russell, 1957

Synonyms
- Pappogeomys alcorni

Subspecies of rodent

Alcorn's pocket gopher (Pappogeomys bulleri alcorni) is a subspecies of the Buller's pocket gopher endemic to the montane pine-oak forests of the Sierra del Tigre mountain range of southern Jalisco, Mexico.

== Taxonomy ==
Alcorn's pocket gopher was first described in 1957 by Robert J. Russell based upon a specimen of an adult female originally collected by Joseph Raymond Alcorn near Mazamitla in 1950. Although it was originally described by Russell as its own species (as Pappogeomys alcorni), it has since instead been assigned to subspecies level. The name alcorni honors Joseph Raymond Alcorn's work collecting specimens of Mexican mammals.

== Distribution ==
Found in the Sierra del Tigre mountains of southern Jalisco, Mexico, Alcorn's pocket gopher inhabits pine-oak forests with iron-rich soils between 910–3,010 m (3,000–10,000 ft).

== Habitat and ecology ==
The ecology of Alcorn's pocket gopher is poorly known. Trapping in agricultural fields near the type locality in 2002 failed to capture any individuals. Subsequent visits to the region in 2009 found that it was abundant in the forested hillsides near Mazamitla, but absent from agricultural fields altogether, suggesting that Alcorn's pocket gopher may be a forest specialist (as are other subspecies of Pappogeomys bulleri).

Alcorn's pocket gopher is the only known host of Geomydoecus alcorni, a louse in the Geomydoecus mcgregori complex which commonly parasitizes species of Cratogeomys.

== Conservation ==
Alcorn's pocket gopher is listed as a protected species by the Mexican government. Although surveys between 1997 and 1998 reported it as being locally abundant, the failure of further surveys to locate any individuals suggested a drastic population decline of 80% or more, leading it to be listed as Critically Endangered on the IUCN Red List. However, given that specimens of Alcorn's pocket gopher were found in 2009, it is possible the species is more widespread than previously suggested, and further surveys of the montane forests near its type locality may lead to reevaluation of its population size and conservation status. Major threats to this species are persecution by farmers (who believe it to damage corn and bean fields), habitat fragmentation, and habitat loss due to deforestation.
