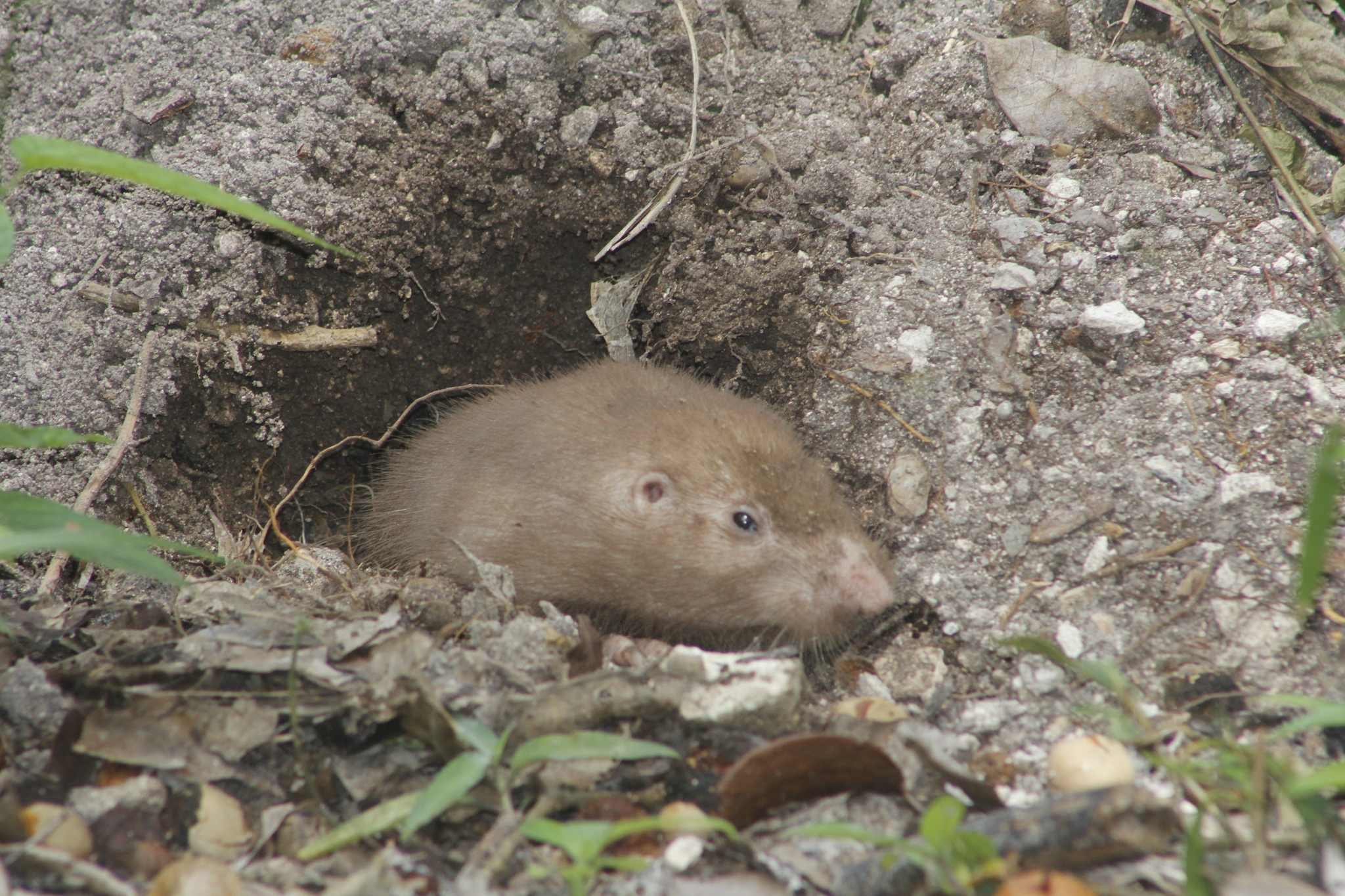
- Heterogeomys hispidus

Scientific classification
- Kingdom: Animalia
- Phylum: Chordata
- Class: Mammalia
- Order: Rodentia
- Family: Geomyidae
- Genus: Heterogeomys; Merriam, 1895

Type species
- Geomys hispidus Le Conte, 1852

Species
- 7 recognized species, see article
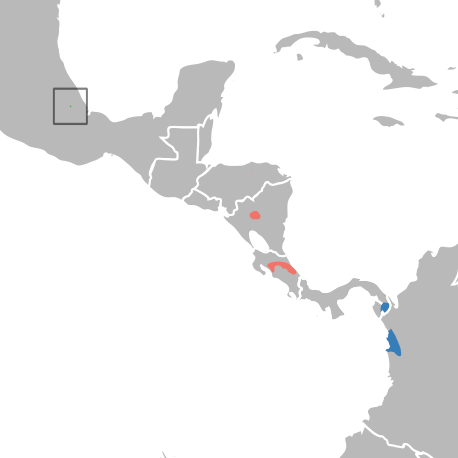
- Heterogeomys distribution H. cherriei in red, H. dariensis in blue, and H. lanius in green (in box)

= Heterogeomys =

Genus of mammals

Heterogeomys is a genus of rodent in the family Geomyidae, found in Mexico, Central America and Colombia. Heterogeomys are a small genus of rodents commonly known as pocket gophers, though the term applies to all genera within the family Geomyidae. The name pocket gopher was earned for this family because of their fur lined cheek pouches that can be used for carrying food. These pouches can also be turned inside out. Species of Heterogeomys are regarded as pests, one of less than 5% of rodent species classified as pests, and the history of man's attempts to control their populations reaches back into Mayan times. Despite some efforts to the contrary, populations of Heterogeomys seem to be on a general upwards trend. Furthermore, all of the species of Heterogeomys are considered to be of Least Concern in the World Status Key.

== Taxonomy ==
In 1895, C. H Meriam described 3 genera of pocket gophers: Heterogeomys, Macrogeomys, and Orthogeomys. In the 1968 taxonomic revision, R. J. Russell recognized Heterogeomys and Macrogeomys as subgenera of Orthogeomys. However, recent studies suggests that Orthogeomys s. l. may be paraphyletic to Cratogeomys and Pappogeomys, which is why Spradling et al. (2016) proposed to divide this genus into Orthogeomys s. s. (only O. grandis) and Heterogeomys (rest species; includes Macrogeomys). This classification was accepted by the American Society of Mammalogists.

=== Species ===
This genus contains the following seven species:

- Chiriqui pocket gopher (Heterogeomys cavator)
- Cherrie's pocket gopher (Heterogeomys cherriei)
- Darien pocket gopher (Heterogeomys dariensis)
- Variable pocket gopher (Heterogeomys heterodus)
- Hispid pocket gopher (Heterogeomys hispidus)
- Big pocket gopher (Heterogeomys lanius)
- Underwood's pocket gopher (Heterogeomys underwoodi)

== Morphology ==
Pocket Gophers range in size from about 170 mm (for example, H. cherriei and H. underwoodi) to around 280 mm (such as H. heterodus and H. cavator). Tails can range in length from 80 to 160 mm depending on the species. Sources have reported that a key factor in determining the size of the animal is the soil composition in the animal's native habitat. Looser, sandy soil types are associated with increased cranial size, while more densely packed soil seems to correlate with a relatively smaller body size. Animals of this genus are typically colored as to blend in with their backgrounds, presenting mostly black or brown or gray coloring on their dorsal sides. The ventral side tends to be more variable in coloration, though in species such as H. underwoodi, the dorsal coat can have patterns such as white bands extending across the hind quarters. Ventral coat coloration is often some combination of white, gray, or brown. Hair on these animals ranges from short to relatively long, and the hairs are generally fine and soft. It is thought that these characteristics are advantageous for the animal to remove dirt from its coat during the grooming process. A very distinctive feature of the Heterogeomys genus is the large incisors that protrude from the mouth, even when the mouth is closed. This is a characteristic that is shared across all rodents, but is particularly prominent in gophers. These enlarged incisors serve two purposes. The first, as is the general trend in animals, tooth shape is adapted to the individual's diet. Secondly, since the teeth protrude out of the mouth, the Heterogeomys can use its teeth to dig, while preventing dirt from entering its oral cavity. Pocket gophers also possess valvular ears, which can be closed to prevent the entry of soil into the auditory canal while digging.

== Behavior ==
=== Burrowing ===
Heterogeomys are solitary creatures except during their breeding seasons. In the breeding seasons though, multiple individuals can occupy the same burrow. During the non-breeding times of year, only one Heterogeomys occupies a tunnel system at a given time. These tunnels are subdivided into areas for their nest, the food store, and a separate tunnel for excrement. In the H. cherriei, tunnels have an average height of 12.8 cm, and can be up to almost 200 m in length. Heterogeomys are primarily active during the morning and afternoon, and are mainly found inside their burrows.

=== Feeding Habits ===
On the whole, pocket Gophers tend to have a higher daily caloric intake than most rodent species. This is due to the added energy expenditures necessary to move around underground, and is a contributing factor to how destructive these animals can be towards crops that are cultivated by humans. Heterogeomys are herbivores, who feed on corn, grass roots, cassava, rice, and sugar cane.

== Interspecies Interactions ==
=== Trapping ===
Documents from before the Spanish settlement of Mexico report different methods on the catching and preparing of pocket gophers for food. Due to the extended length of time that trapping has been a part of the community, it should come as no surprise that the practice of trapping has gained cultural significance in southeastern Mexico. Unfortunately, the nature of the traps used in the past by the Mayan's is a mystery now, but present methods of gopher trapping can be observed. Two popular snares used in the modern day both make use of a spring, a snare, and a tension line. One trap is set off by a gopher running into a tension line, and another by a gopher chewing through a baited line.

=== Pest Control ===
Heterogeomys often feed off of bananas and other crops that are being cultivated by humans. These pocket gophers are capable of being quite destructive towards these crops as well, capable of causing up to a 50% loss in crops. Because of the significant losses, people have poured much effort into trying to control Pocket Gopher populations. In Costa Rica, several methods of pest control have been pursued, but many have been abandoned in searching for the ideal solution. Mongooses have been introduced into the Heterogeomys habitats in hopes of culling their numbers, food has been poisoned and left out for the Heterogeomys to find, or the spreading of toxic chemicals. Unfortunately, the latter two options pose not only are harmful to the Heterogeomys, but to humans as well. Since there is no antidote available in Costa Rica for some of the chemicals used in pest control, so the use of these chemicals must be carefully managed.

=== Cophylogeny ===
Evidence suggests that a close relationship has existed between pocket gophers and chewing lice for significant periods of time. It has been posited that this relationship is due to the fact that both of these creatures habits make them quite well suited for parallel evolution. By tunneling underground, these gophers are creating a slightly more palatable environment than had existed before, and this environment would become populated with organisms. These organisms would become gradually adapted, not only to the tunnel environment, but likely also to the gophers who created the tunnels. In the case of chewing lice, this would mean attaching onto, and becoming well suited to overcoming the hosts defense systems, but without causing so much harm as to kill the host. Since pocket gophers are so solitary, any contact that they have with other animals is likely to be with other pocket gophers of their same species. In this way, a certain initial type of lice could be passed on almost exclusively in one species of pocket gopher for generations and generations, producing a new species of louse, specific to one species of pocket gopher.
