= Big pocket gopher =

Conservation status
- Critically Endangered (IUCN 3.1)

Scientific classification
- Kingdom: Animalia
- Phylum: Chordata
- Class: Mammalia
- Infraclass: Placentalia
- Order: Rodentia
- Family: Geomyidae
- Genus: Heterogeomys
- Species: H. lanius

Binomial name
- Heterogeomys lanius Elliot, 1905
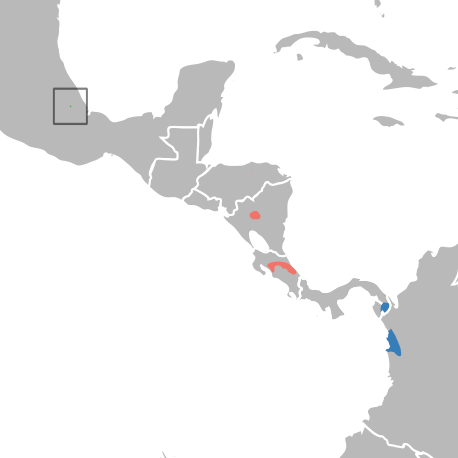
- Heterogeomys distribution H. lanius in green (in box)

Synonyms
- Orthogeomys lanius

Species of rodent

The big pocket gopher (Heterogeomys lanius) is a species of rodent in the family Geomyidae. It is endemic to Veracruz state in eastern Mexico. It has only been found on the southeastern slopes of Pico de Orizaba, at elevations of 1,300 metres (4,300 ft).

Some authors classify it in the genus Orthogeomys, but recent research has allowed this and its related species to be classified in the genus Heterogeomys.
