= Darien pocket gopher =

Conservation status
- Least Concern (IUCN 3.1)

Scientific classification
- Kingdom: Animalia
- Phylum: Chordata
- Class: Mammalia
- Order: Rodentia
- Family: Geomyidae
- Genus: Heterogeomys
- Species: H. dariensis

Binomial name
- Heterogeomys dariensis (Goldman, 1912)
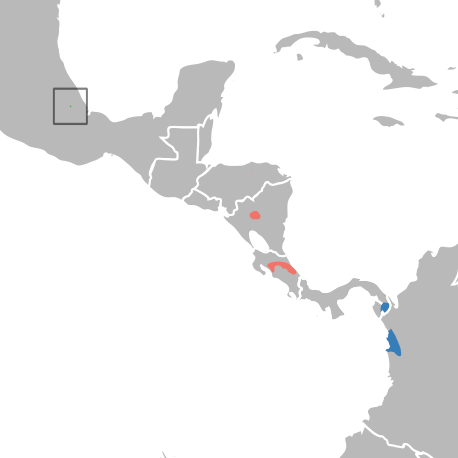
- Heterogeomys distribution H. dariensis in blue

Synonyms
- Orthogeomys dariensis; Orthogeomys thaeleri

Species of rodent

The Darien pocket gopher (Heterogeomys dariensis) is a species of rodent in the family Geomyidae. It occurs in Panama and Colombia. Some authors classify it in the genus Orthogeomys, but later research has allowed this and its related species to be classified in the genus Heterogeomys.

It includes the Thaeler's pocket gopher (H. d. thaeleri), endemic to Colombia as a subspecies. Previously, this subspecies was considered a separate species.
