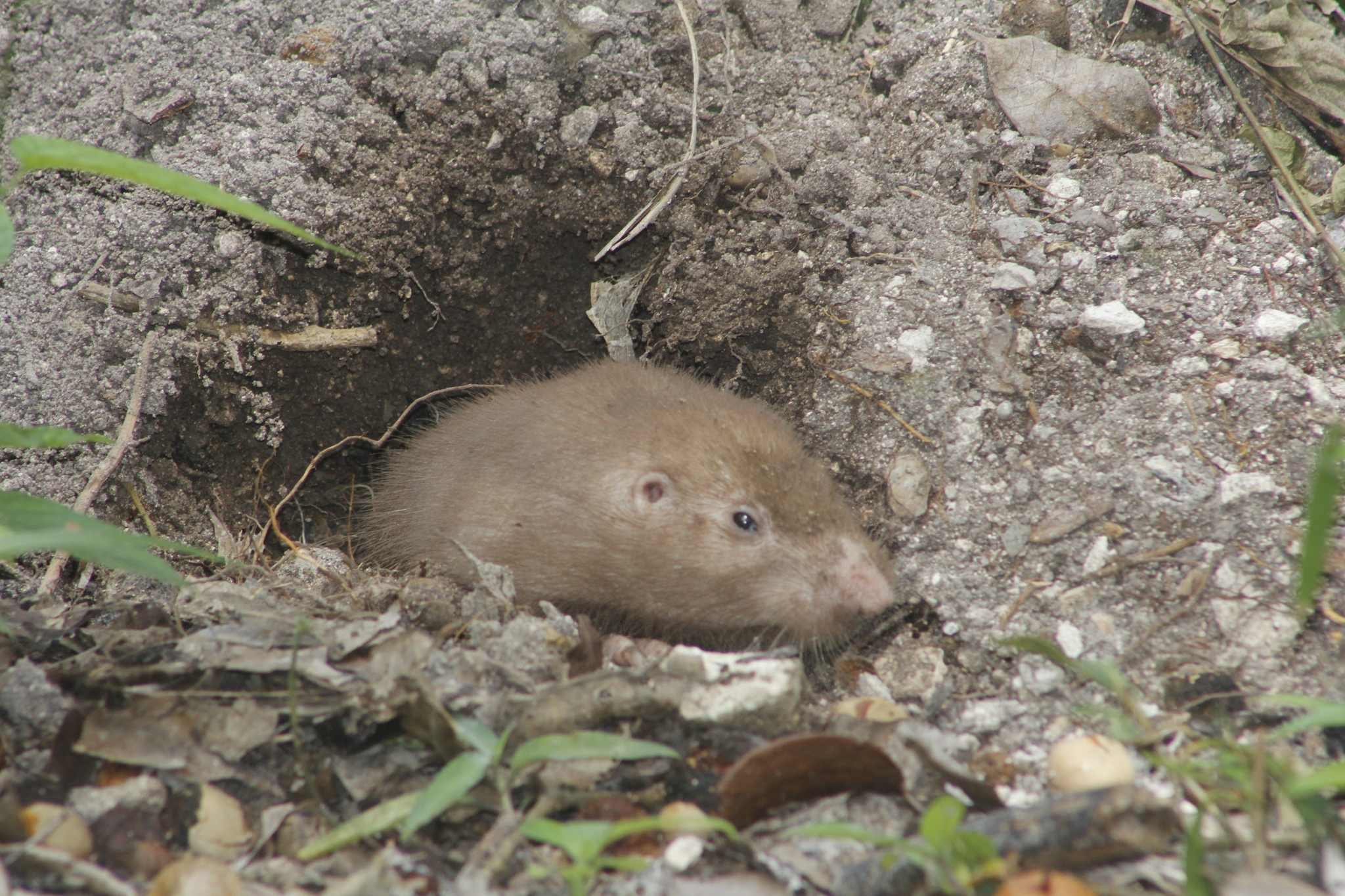

Conservation status
- Least Concern (IUCN 3.1)

Scientific classification
- Kingdom: Animalia
- Phylum: Chordata
- Class: Mammalia
- Order: Rodentia
- Family: Geomyidae
- Genus: Heterogeomys
- Species: H. hispidus

Binomial name
- Heterogeomys hispidus (Le Conte, 1852)
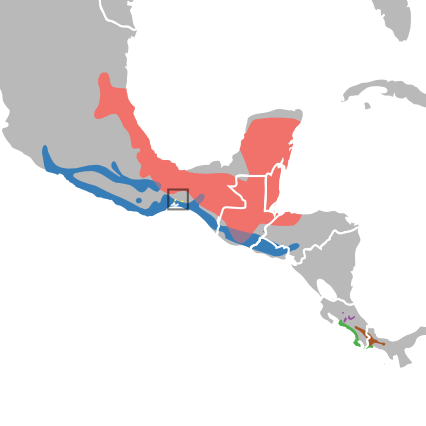
- Orthogeomys distribution H. hispidus in red

Synonyms
- Geomys hispidus; Orthogeomys hispidus

= Hispid pocket gopher =

Species of rodent

The hispid pocket gopher (Heterogeomys hispidus) is a species of rodent in the family Geomyidae. It is found in Mexico, Belize, Guatemala, and Honduras. Some authors classify it in the genus Orthogeomys, but recent research has allowed this and its related species to be classified in the genus Heterogeomys.
