= Variable pocket gopher =

Conservation status
- Least Concern (IUCN 3.1)

Scientific classification
- Kingdom: Animalia
- Phylum: Chordata
- Class: Mammalia
- Infraclass: Placentalia
- Order: Rodentia
- Family: Geomyidae
- Genus: Heterogeomys
- Species: H. heterodus

Binomial name
- Heterogeomys heterodus (Peters, 1865)
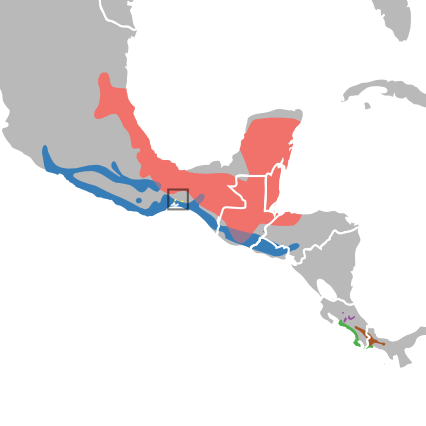
- Orthogeomys distribution H. heterodus in purple

Synonyms
- Orthogeomys heterodus

Species of rodent

The variable pocket gopher (Heterogeomys heterodus) is a species of rodent in the family Geomyidae. It is endemic to Costa Rica, usually being found in grasslands and tropical forests at higher altitudes, up to 8,000 feet. It is threatened by habitat loss, but are sometimes kept as pets in the United States and elsewhere.

The gopher typically has soft and dense fur colored blackish on the posterior and pale on the anterior. Its dentition features a longitudinal groove on outer face of each upper incisor. Large specimens range in length from 12 to 19 inches in length and weigh 16 to 35 ounces.

Some authors classify it in the genus Orthogeomys, but recent research has allowed this and its related species to be classified in the genus Heterogeomys.
