= Underwood's pocket gopher =

Conservation status
- Least Concern (IUCN 3.1)

Scientific classification
- Kingdom: Animalia
- Phylum: Chordata
- Class: Mammalia
- Infraclass: Placentalia
- Order: Rodentia
- Family: Geomyidae
- Genus: Heterogeomys
- Species: H. underwoodi

Binomial name
- Heterogeomys underwoodi (Osgood, 1931)
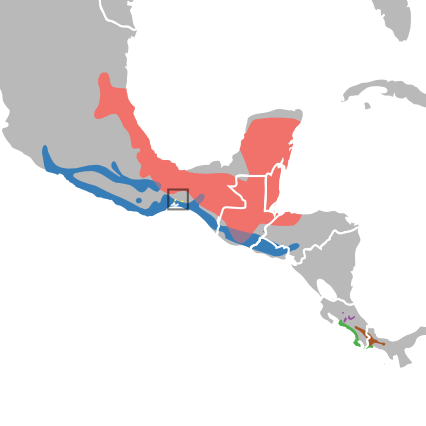
- Orthogeomys distribution H. underwoodi in green

Synonyms
- Macrogeomys underwoodi; Orthogeomys underwoodi

Species of rodent

Underwood's pocket gopher (Heterogeomys underwoodi) is a species of rodent in the family Geomyidae. It is endemic to Costa Rica. Some authors classify it in the genus Orthogeomys, but recent research has allowed this and its related species to be classified in the genus Heterogeomys.
