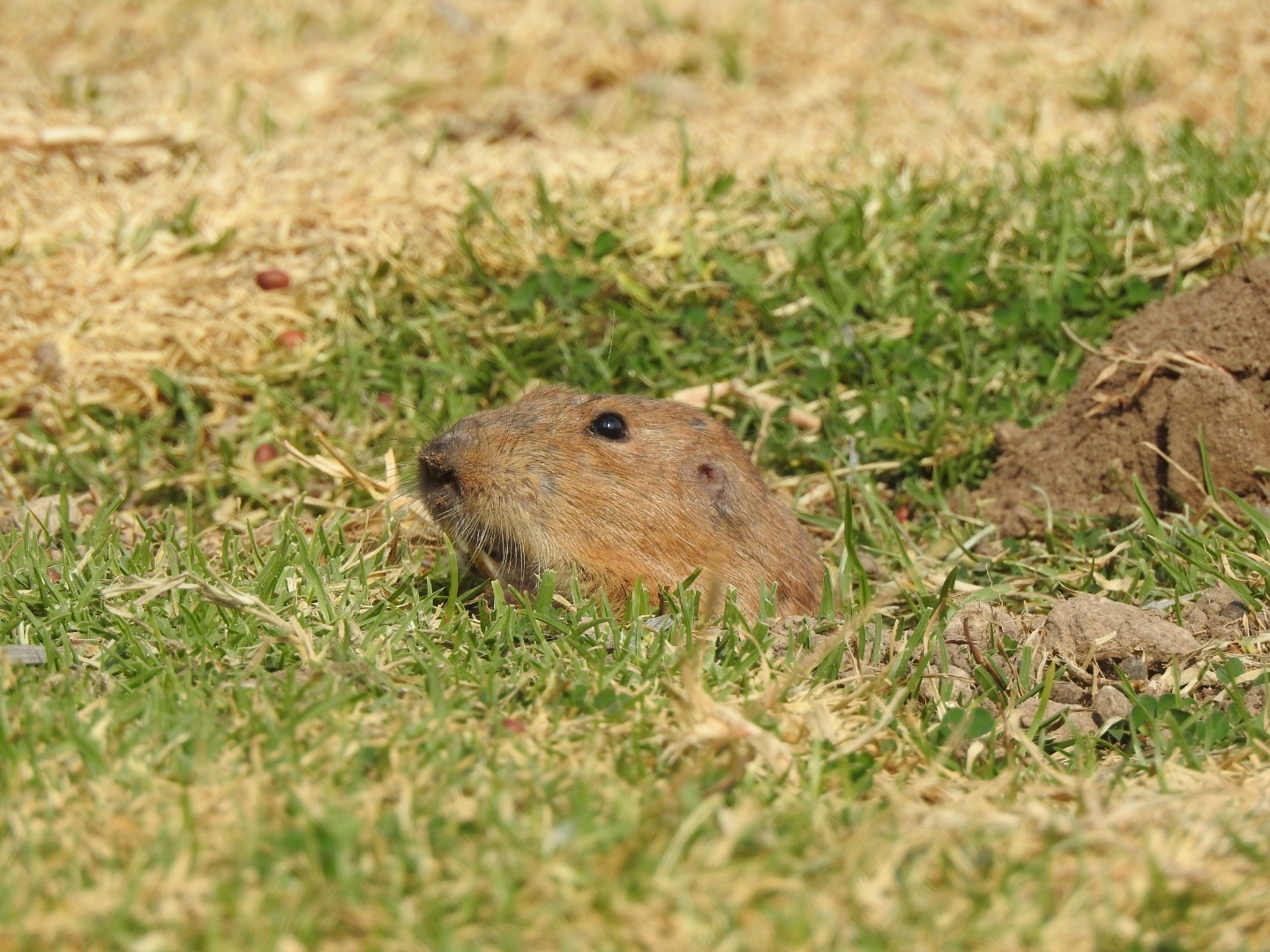

Conservation status
- Least Concern (IUCN 3.1)

Scientific classification
- Kingdom: Animalia
- Phylum: Chordata
- Class: Mammalia
- Infraclass: Placentalia
- Order: Rodentia
- Family: Geomyidae
- Genus: Cratogeomys
- Species: C. goldmani

Binomial name
- Cratogeomys goldmani (Merriam, 1895)

Subspecies
- See text
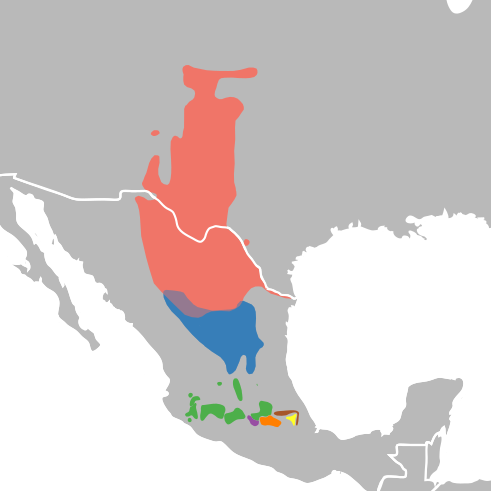
- Cratogeomys distribution C. goldmani in blue (overlaps with C. castanops)

Synonyms
- Pappogeomys goldmani

= Goldman's pocket gopher =

Species of rodent

Goldman's pocket gopher (Cratogeomys goldmani) is a species of rodent in the pocket gopher family. It is distributed throughout northern Mexico. It was formerly considered a subspecies of the yellow-faced pocket gopher. It is named after Edward Alphonso Goldman, who collected the holotype of this species.

== Subspecies ==
There are currently seven identified subspecies of Cratogeomys goldmani:

- Cratogeomys goldmani elibatus
- Cratogeomys goldmani goldmani
- Cratogeomys goldmani maculats
- Cratogeomys goldmani peridoneus
- Cratogeomys goldmani planifrons
- Cratogeomys goldmani rubellus
- Cratogeomys goldmani subnubilus
