= Volcan de Toluca pocket gopher =

Conservation status
- Least Concern (IUCN 3.1)

Scientific classification
- Kingdom: Animalia
- Phylum: Chordata
- Class: Mammalia
- Infraclass: Placentalia
- Order: Rodentia
- Superfamily: Geomyoidea
- Family: Geomyidae
- Genus: Cratogeomys
- Species: C. planiceps

Binomial name
- Cratogeomys planiceps Merriam, 1895
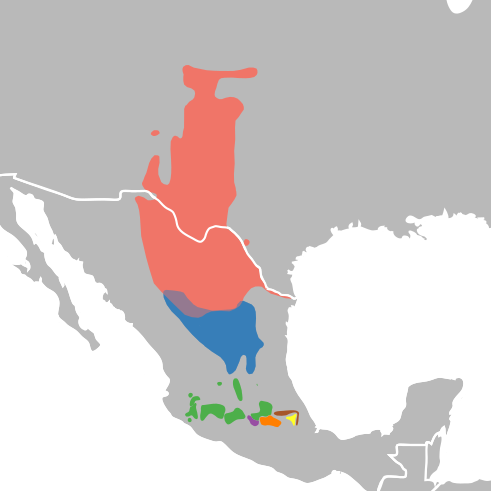
- Cratogeomys distribution C. planiceps in purple

Species of rodent

The Volcan de Toluca pocket gopher (Cratogeomys planiceps), also known as the flathead pocket gopher, Volcán de Toluca pocket gopher, Nevado de Toluca pocket gopher, or the Toluca Volcano pocket gopher, is a species of pocket gopher that is native to south-central Mexico, at upward elevations of 2500–3500 m. It was described by Clinton Hart Merriam in 1895.

== Description ==
Males meausure 235–280 mm (9.3–11.0 in) in length and females measure 215–250 mm (8.5–9.8 in), with tails of around 75–110 mm (3.0–4.3 in). Both genders are approximately 400–625 g (14.1–22.0 oz), with the maximum of females reaching around 600 g (21 oz), compared to the average male weight of 625 g (22.0 oz). Males are generally larger than females, although sexual dimorphism may play a role in average size. Dark brown-red coats, a light brown wash, and a buff stomach.

== Diet ==
The Volcan de Toluca pocket gopher primarily feasts on tubers and roots of plants, with occasional vegetation thrown in the mix. Underground chambers are made by the species for storage of food.

== Distribution and habitat ==
The Volcan de Toluca pocket gopher is endemic to surrounding areas and within the Nevado de Toluca, Mexico, Mexico, primarily on the northern slopes. Its habitat is made up of pine-oak forests and pine-fir-spruce forests at elevations of 2500–3500 m. Tunnels are built in grassland clearings, where many individuals may reside with a distance in between them and other pairs. Groupings of the species are known to build their tunnels on agricultural lands, which makes the term "pests" valid, for they are imposing on human infrastructure and development.

== Classification ==
The Volcan de Toluca pocket gopher was classified as a subspecies of Cratogeomys tylorhinus in 2005. Cratogeomys tylorhinus is now listed as a synonym of the Smoky pocket gopher (Cratogeomys fumosus). It is genetically diverse when to the Smoky pocket gopher, hence its status as a distinct species.

== Genetics ==
The species diploid number is 2 n = 38, with its fundamental number being FN = 72, clearly differentiating it from the Smoky pocket gopher, which has a diploid and fundamental number of 2 n = 36 and FN = 68.

== Conservation ==
The species is listed as "Least Concern" by the IUCN Red List, for there are no listed threats present. Minor threats may include: wildfires, clearing of land for agriculture, human intervention (in terms of pest removal), hunting, and drought. These minor threats have not been proven, but are generally common throughout the region.
