= Cherrie's pocket gopher =

Conservation status
- Least Concern (IUCN 3.1)

Scientific classification
- Kingdom: Animalia
- Phylum: Chordata
- Class: Mammalia
- Infraclass: Placentalia
- Order: Rodentia
- Family: Geomyidae
- Genus: Heterogeomys
- Species: H. cherriei

Binomial name
- Heterogeomys cherriei (J. A. Allen, 1893)
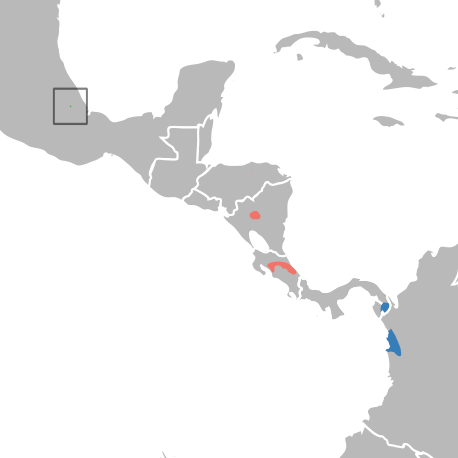
- Heterogeomys distribution H. cherriei in red

Synonyms
- Orthogeomys cherriei; Orthogeomys matagalpae

Species of rodent

Cherrie's pocket gopher (Heterogeomys cherriei) is a species of rodent in the family Geomyidae. It is found in Honduras, Nicaragua, and Costa Rica. It is threatened by habitat loss. Some authors classify it in the genus Orthogeomys, but recent research has allowed this and its related species to be classified in the genus Heterogeomys.

== Taxonomy ==
Traditionally, the species is subdivided into three subspecies:

- Orthogeomys cherriei carlosensis (Goodwin, 1934)
- Orthogeomys cherriei cherriei (J. A. Allen, 1893)
- Orthogeomys cherriei costaricensis (Merriam, 1895)

Recent study has allowed the identification of a fourth subspecies, previously considered as a separate species:

- Heterogeomys cherriei matagalpae J. A. Allen, 1910, geographically isolated subspecies found in Honduras and Nicaragua.
