= Chiriqui pocket gopher =

Conservation status
- Least Concern (IUCN 3.1)

Scientific classification
- Kingdom: Animalia
- Phylum: Chordata
- Class: Mammalia
- Infraclass: Placentalia
- Order: Rodentia
- Family: Geomyidae
- Genus: Heterogeomys
- Species: H. cavator

Binomial name
- Heterogeomys cavator (Bangs, 1902)
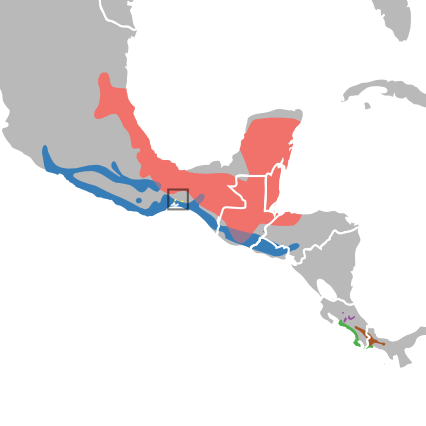
- Orthogeomys distribution H. cavator in brown

Synonyms
- Orthogeomys cavator

Species of rodent

The Chiriqui pocket gopher (Heterogeomys cavator) is a species of rodent in the family Geomyidae. It is found in Costa Rica and Panama. Some authors classify it in the genus Orthogeomys, but recent research has allowed this and its related species to be classified in the genus Heterogeomys.
