= Michoacan pocket gopher =

Conservation status
- Endangered (IUCN 3.1)

Scientific classification
- Kingdom: Animalia
- Phylum: Chordata
- Class: Mammalia
- Order: Rodentia
- Family: Geomyidae
- Genus: Zygogeomys; Merriam, 1895
- Species: Z. trichopus

Binomial name
- Zygogeomys trichopus Merriam, 1895
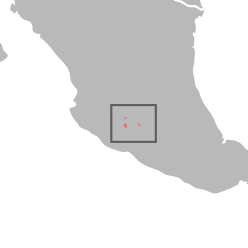
- Zygogeomys distribution

Species of rodent

The Michoacan pocket gopher (Zygogeomys trichopus) is a species of rodent in the family Geomyidae. It is monotypic within the genus Zygogeomys. It is endemic to Mexico where its natural habitat is temperate, high-altitude forests. Its numbers are declining and it is listed by the IUCN as "endangered".

== Description ==
The Michoacan pocket gopher is a small animal with short, dense, black, lustrous fur and a hairless tail. The eyes are small and deep-set and there is a pad-like region of bare skin just behind the nostrils. It is docile when caught, making no attempt to bite as do other pocket gophers.

== Distribution and habitat ==
The Michoacan pocket gopher is endemic to the Trans-Mexican Volcanic Belt mountain range in central southern Mexico, where it occurs in four discrete locations near west of Lake Pátzcuaro at altitudes over 2,200 metres (7,200 ft). The fossil record shows that members of the genus Zygogeomys, including two other now extinct species, were widespread in the late Pliocene epoch in the southwestern United States. Its typical habitat is mixed forests of spruce, pine, and alder with deep friable soil suitable for burrowing. A number of small populations separated by unsuitable terrain exist. The species shows little genetic variation and the present population may be a relict of a previous, more widespread distribution.

== Natural history ==
The Michoacan pocket gopher lives in a burrow and throws up a characteristic, cone-shaped mound of soil on the surface with no visible entrance. A central chamber has been found 2 m (6 ft 7 in) underground and may be where the young are raised. Little is known of the animal's breeding habits, which may be seasonal, as males caught in March and August had small testes while one caught in December had large ones. A pregnant female containing one embryo has been caught in December. This animal is seldom caught in surface traps and it may live and forage almost entirely underground.

In its natural habitat of Michoacán, the pocket gopher has been reported to cause damage to avocado trees and mutilate young trees in reforestation projects, as well as wreak structural damage on roads, building sites, and irrigation canals.

== Status ==
The habitat requirements of the Michoacan pocket gopher are very specific, and where agriculture replaces the native woodland in which it lives, it is restricted to higher altitudes and tends to be replaced by other species of pocket gopher (Pappogeomys). Its total area of occurrence is less than 5,000 km^{2} (1,900 sq mi), its range is fragmented, and its population is declining, and the IUCN has listed it as "endangered".
