= Tropical pocket gopher =

Conservation status
- Endangered (IUCN 3.1)

Scientific classification
- Kingdom: Animalia
- Phylum: Chordata
- Class: Mammalia
- Order: Rodentia
- Family: Geomyidae
- Genus: Geomys
- Species: G. tropicalis

Binomial name
- Geomys tropicalis Goldman, 1915

Species of rodent

The tropical pocket gopher (Geomys tropicalis) is a species of rodent in the family Geomyidae. It is endemic to Mexico and has no subspecies. Its natural habitat is hot deserts.The species biggest threat is due to habitat loss.This habitat loss is due to the increase in agriculture, urbanization and industrialization which is fragmenting their habitat in the nearby cities of Altamira and Tampico. Due to this animal living primarily underground, it is difficult to learn information about the species. This poses an extinction risk because they are typically go unnoticed in their environment, especially to the public. Therefore, the tropical pocket gopher could go extinct without anyone realizing.

== Description ==
The tropical pocket gopher is cinnamon to brown on its back and head. Their face is short and broad with whiskers used for sensing their surroundings. Its underparts have white fur, and its tail is mostly naked. They have large front feet, along with small eyes and a thick body. Males are on average larger than females.They have very powerful teeth that are quite unique as well. They have 20 teeth that continuously grow due to the constant use when they are digging under the surface of the Earth. Just like other rodents, they use their cheeks as pockets to hold food for later so they can continue on and limit exposure to predators.

Tropical pocket gophers have strong pectoral muscles and claws solely used for digging underground in the soil in which they create tunnels for their home. They have five toes on each leg, and calluses on the palms on the front limbs which makes it easier for them to push the dirt as they are digging.

== Diet ==
The tropical pocket gopher feeds mostly on plants. They consume the exposed part of plants more than anything, such as leaves, stems, roots, and bulbs of herbaceous plants. They may also consume soft, thin stems of certain shrubs.

== Distribution and Habitat ==
The distribution of the tropical pocket gopher is restricted to a small area of the Veracruz moist forests, near the southeastern corner of Tamaulipas, Mexico.They live their lives primarily underground which makes it very difficult to learn about this animal.

== Genetics ==
The tropical pocket gopher has a diploid number of 38. This is low compared to similar species. This could help them adapt to their restricted habitat. Since their numbers are low there is a high risk of them losing too much genetic variability to survive.

== Origin of Species Name ==
The tropical pocket gopher got its name based on roots from Greek/Latin origin. The part Geo, meaning "earth," and mys, meaning "mouse." Tropicalis species name, originates from the word tropic, meaning "tropical," and the Latin suffix alis, meaning "pertaining to."

== Ecological Importance ==
Due to the rodent living among the soil in the deserts of Mexico, they promote the dynamics of it. The help the soil both physically and chemically which encourages new plant growth. The tropical pocket gopher also helps with the control of plants by removing plants for nesting or food. This species is prey for many animals such as snakes, foxes, weasels, and skunks.By being prey, they provide energy to the food web for the desert environment that they live in. Additionally, their abandoned tunnels provide shelter for many other animals and invertebrates.
