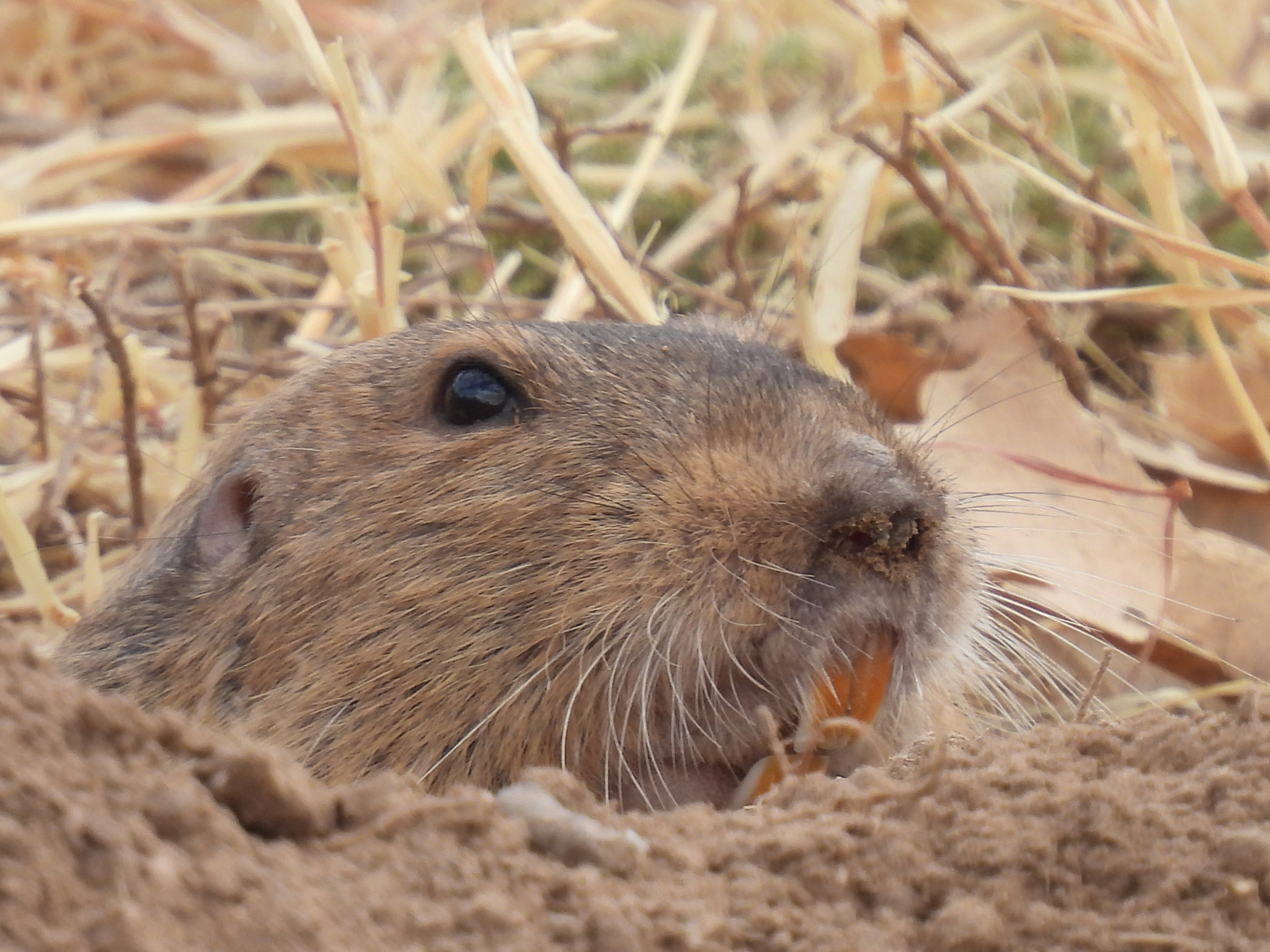

Conservation status
- Least Concern (IUCN 3.1)

Scientific classification
- Kingdom: Animalia
- Phylum: Chordata
- Class: Mammalia
- Infraclass: Placentalia
- Order: Rodentia
- Family: Geomyidae
- Genus: Cratogeomys
- Species: C. castanops

Binomial name
- Cratogeomys castanops (Baird, 1852)

Subspecies
- See text
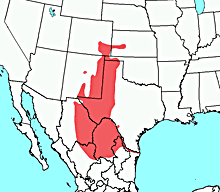
- Range of Cratogeomys castanops

Synonyms
- Pappogeomys castanops

= Yellow-faced pocket gopher =

Species of rodent

The yellow-faced pocket gopher (Cratogeomys castanops) is a species of pocket gopher that is native to shortgrass prairies in the south-western United States and northern Mexico. It is the species that lives north of the Southern Coahuila Filter-Barrier (SCFB). Among the different species, the yellow-faced pocket gopher has a small to medium-sized skull. The fossil of this genus was recorded from the pre-Pleistocene Benson Beds of Arizona.

The yellow-faced pocket gopher has a yellowish-brown coat, a short tail, and one deep groove down the anterior middle of each incisor.

== Form and function ==
Adults of C. castanops in Texas begin to molt in August and continue through March. The new pelage was found to be thicker, but had no change in color. In Kansas, semiannual molts in adults have been reported:

1. Molt from winter to summer early in the spring
2. Molt in autumn in September and October

There is sexual dimorphism in the yellow-faced pocket gophers; the males are larger than the females. The males of all genera of pocket gophers continue to grow after attaining sexual maturity, but females grow little after reaching sexual maturity.

== Ontogeny and reproduction ==
The reproductive activity of yellow-faced pocket gophers start in November and increases to a peak in March and/or April. During mating and copulation, the males emits low guttural squeaks throughout exploratory activities, then the male bites the female when body contact is made. When young animals are old enough to leave the nest, they travel about maternal burrows. Then, when the young are nearly full grown, they disperse from the parental burrow.

== Behavior ==
Researchers have seen a swimming ability in yellow-faced pocket gophers. However, this genus of pocket gophers are less durable than other genera in water, perhaps because of the greater bulk (of its body) that inhibits its endurance.

Most of the foraging is done from the burrow system the yellow-faced pocket gophers create, pulling plants into the burrow by their roots. The burrow system consists of tunnels dug by the gophers averaging 75.8 m in length and 10 to 132 cm in depth.

== Ecology ==
Yellow-faced pocket gophers usually inhabit deep sandy or silty soils that are relatively free from rocks. However, where Geomys (another genus of pocket gophers) is present, Cratogeomys is restricted to "denser, shallower, sometimes rocket soils." Research in Kansas showed that tracts that had no gophers occupying it consisted largely of areas with fine-textured soils that are planted with crops. The crops (corn, wheat, and grain sorghum) were harvested and disked annually along with the roadside ditches adjacent to the cropland. It was concluded that pocket gophers are not able to inhabit these lands because land-use practices have destabilized the habitats, eliminating both refuge and dispersal corridors.

Yellow-faced pocket gophers are preyed on by small carnivorous mammals and large hawks and owls.

== Subspecies ==
There are currently 18 identified subspecies of Cratogeomys castanops:

- C. c. angusticeps
- C. c. bullatus
- C. c. castanops
- C. c. clarkii
- C. c. consitus
- C. c. dalquesti
- C. c. excelsus
- C. c. hirtus
- C. c. jucundus
- C. c. parviceps
- C. c. perexiguus
- C. c. perplanus
- C. c. pratensi
- C. c. sordidulus
- C. c. subsimus
- C. c. surculus
- C. c. tamaulipensis
- C. c. ustulatus
