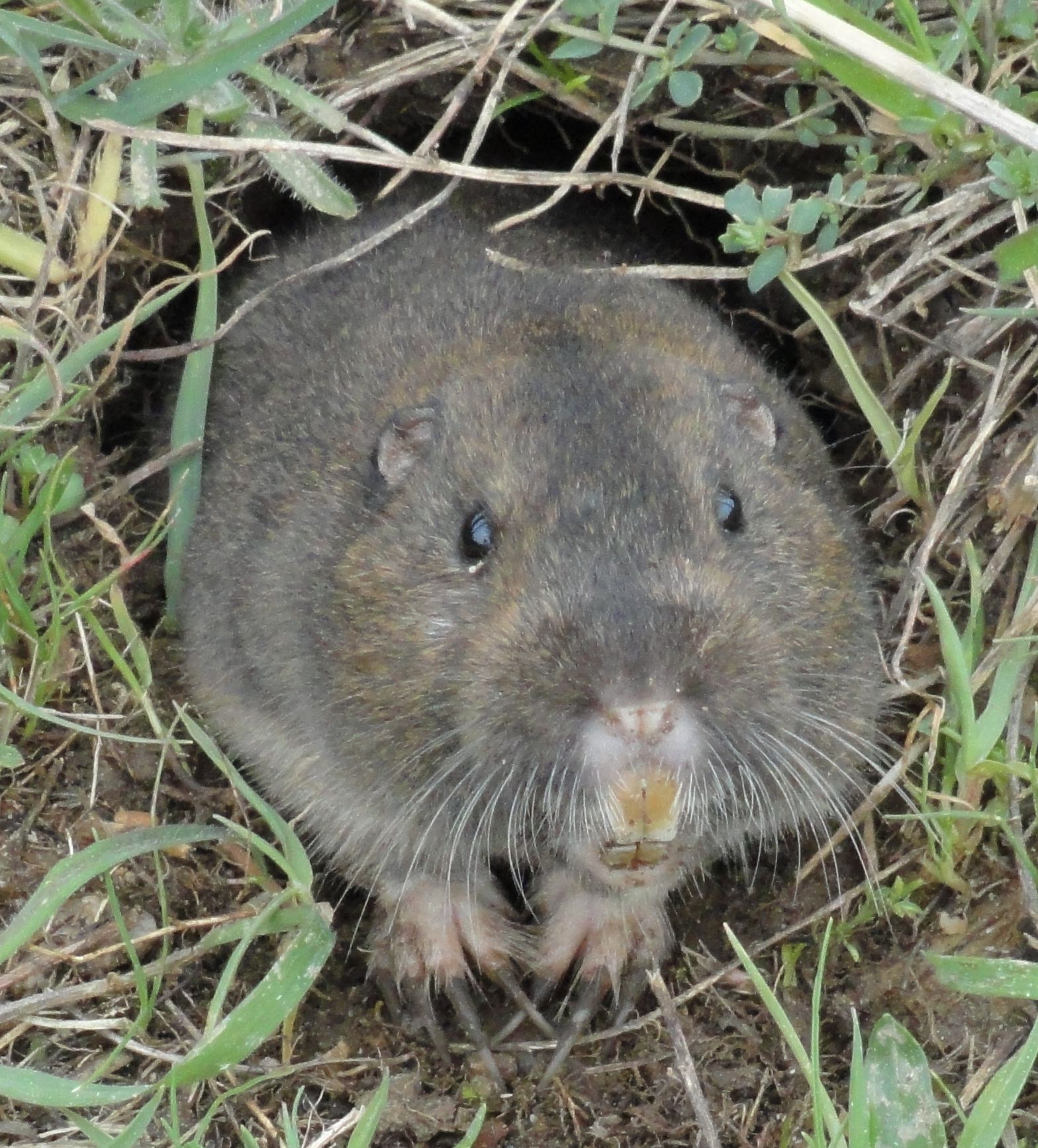
- Botta's pocket gopher (Thomomys bottae)

Scientific classification
- Kingdom: Animalia
- Phylum: Chordata
- Class: Mammalia
- Order: Rodentia
- Superfamily: Geomyoidea
- Family: Geomyidae; Bonaparte, 1845

Type genus
- Geomys Rafinesque, 1817

Genera
- Cratogeomys; Geomys; Heterogeomys; Orthogeomys; Pappogeomys; Thomomys; Zygogeomys

Diversity
- Around 41 species in 7 genera
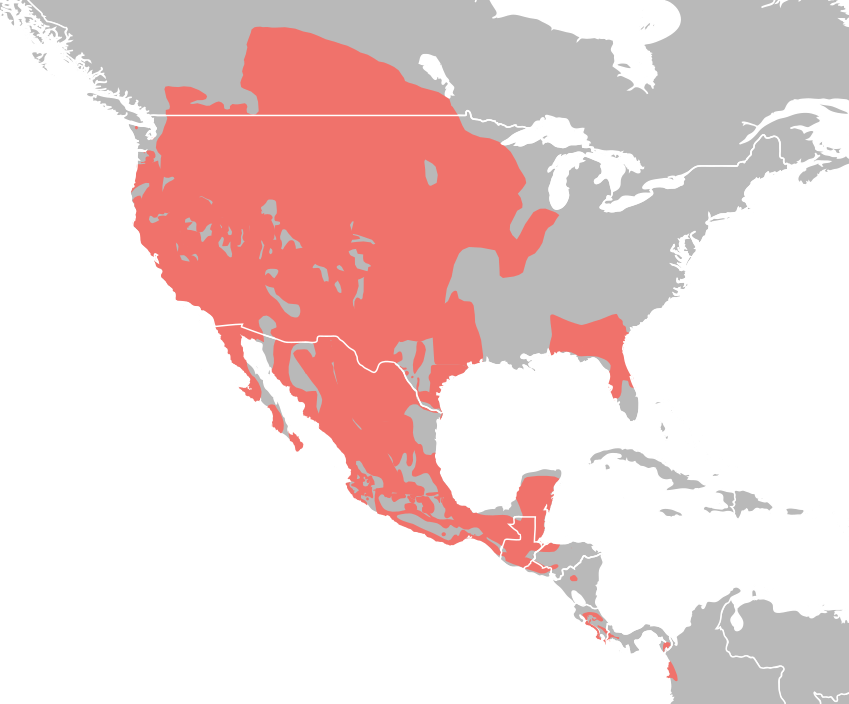
- Geomyidae distribution

= Gopher =

Pocket gophers Temporal range: Chadronian–present

Family of burrowing rodents

Pocket gophers, commonly referred to simply as gophers, are burrowing rodents of the family Geomyidae. The roughly 41 species are all endemic to North and Central America. They are commonly known for their extensive tunneling activities and their ability to damage farms and gardens.

The name "pocket gopher" on its own may refer to any of a number of genera within the family Geomyidae. These are the "true" gophers, but several ground squirrels in the distantly related family Sciuridae are often called "gophers", as well. The origin of the word "gopher" is uncertain; the French gaufre, meaning "waffle", has been suggested, on account of the gopher tunnels resembling the honeycomb-like pattern of holes in a waffle. Some sources suggest a Muskogean origin of the name.

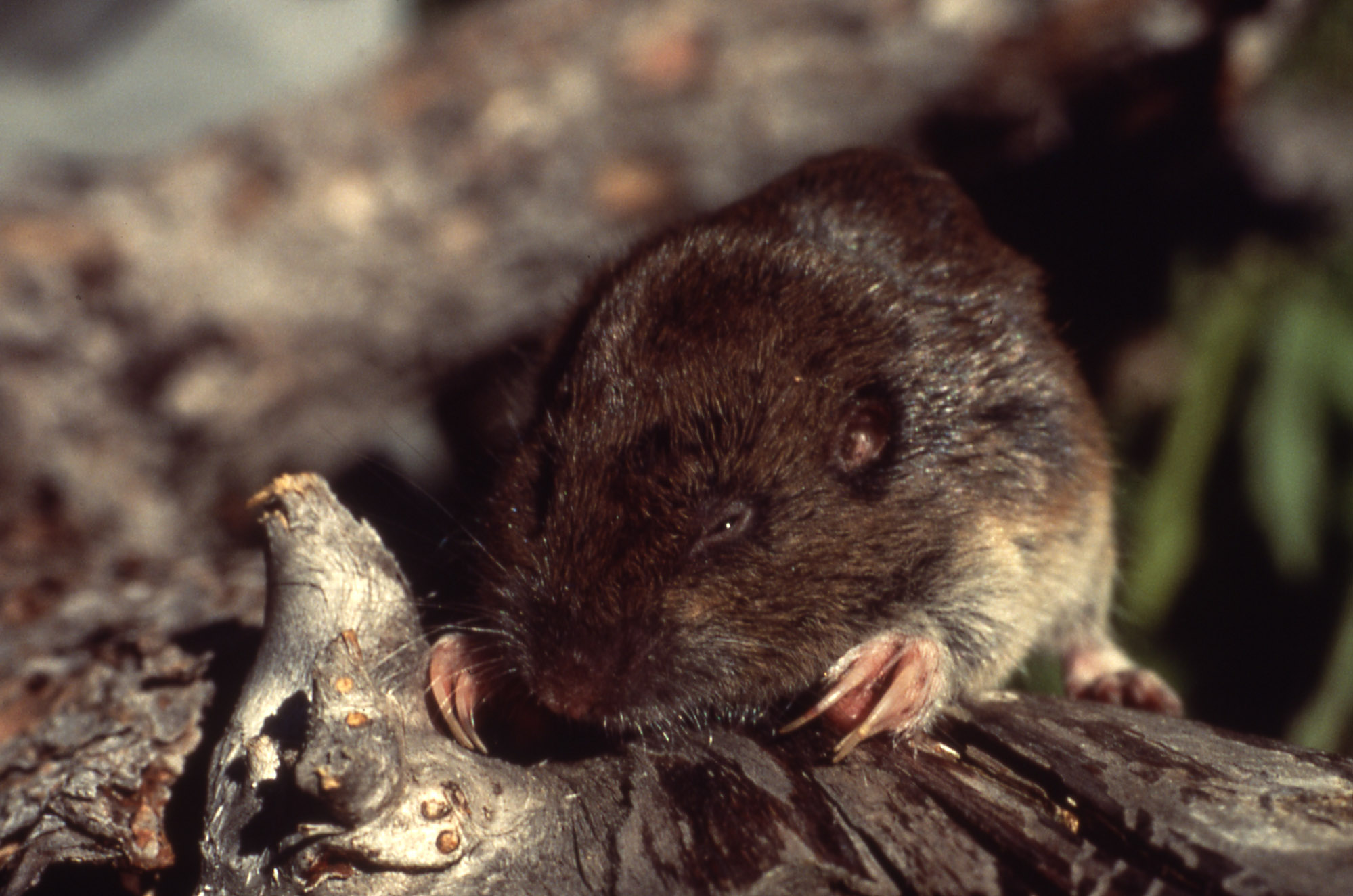
A typical pocket gopher

== Description ==
Pocket gophers weigh around 200 g (1/2 lb), and are about 15–20 cm (6–8 in) in body length, with a tail 2.5–5 cm (1–2 in) long. A few species reach weights approaching 1 kg (2.2 lb). Within any particular gopher species, the males are larger than the females, and can be nearly double their weight.

Average lifespans are one to three years. The maximum lifespan for the pocket gopher is about five years. Some gophers, such as those in the genus Geomys, have lifespans that have been documented as up to seven years in the wild.

Most gophers have brown fur that often closely matches the color of the soil in which they live. Their most characteristic features are their large cheek pouches, from which the word "pocket" in their name derives. These pouches are fur-lined, can be turned inside out, and extend from the side of the mouth well back onto the shoulders. Gophers have small eyes and a short, hairy tail, which they use to feel around tunnels when they walk backwards.

Pocket gophers have often been found to carry external parasites including, most commonly, lice, but also ticks, fleas, and mites. Common predators of the gopher include weasels, snakes, and hawks.

=== Behavior ===
All pocket gophers create a network of tunnel systems that provide protection and a means of collecting food. They are larder hoarders, and their cheek pouches are used for transporting food back to their burrows. Gophers can collect large hoards. Unlike ground squirrels, gophers do not live in large communities and seldom find themselves above ground. Tunnel entrances can be identified by small piles of loose soil covering the opening. Burrows are in many areas where the soil is softer and easily tunneled. Gophers often visit vegetable gardens, lawns, or farms, as they like moist soil (see Soil biomantle). This has led to their frequent treatment as pests.

Gophers eat plant roots, shrubs, and other vegetables such as carrots, lettuce, radishes, and any other vegetables with juice. Some species are considered agricultural pests. The resulting destruction of plant life then leaves the area a stretch of denuded soil. At the same time, the soil disturbance created by turning it over can lead to the early establishment of ecological succession in communities of r-selected and other ruderal plant species. The stashing and subsequent decomposition of plant material in the gophers' larder can produce deep fertilization of the soil.

Pocket gophers are solitary outside of the breeding season, aggressively maintaining territories that vary in size depending on the resources available. Males and females may share some burrows and nesting chambers if their territories border each other, but in general, each pocket gopher inhabits its own individual tunnel system. Although they attempt to flee when threatened, they may attack other animals, including cats and humans, and can inflict serious bites with their long, sharp teeth.

Depending on the species and local conditions, pocket gophers may have a specific annual breeding season, or may breed repeatedly through the year. Each litter typically consists of two to five young, although this may be much higher in some species. The young are born blind and helpless and are weaned when around 40 days old.

== Control ==
Geomys and Thomomys species are classed as "prohibited new organisms" under New Zealand's Hazardous Substances and New Organisms Act 1996, preventing them from being imported into the country.

== Classification ==
Much debate exists among taxonomists about which races of pocket gophers should be recognized as full species, and the following list cannot be regarded as definitive.

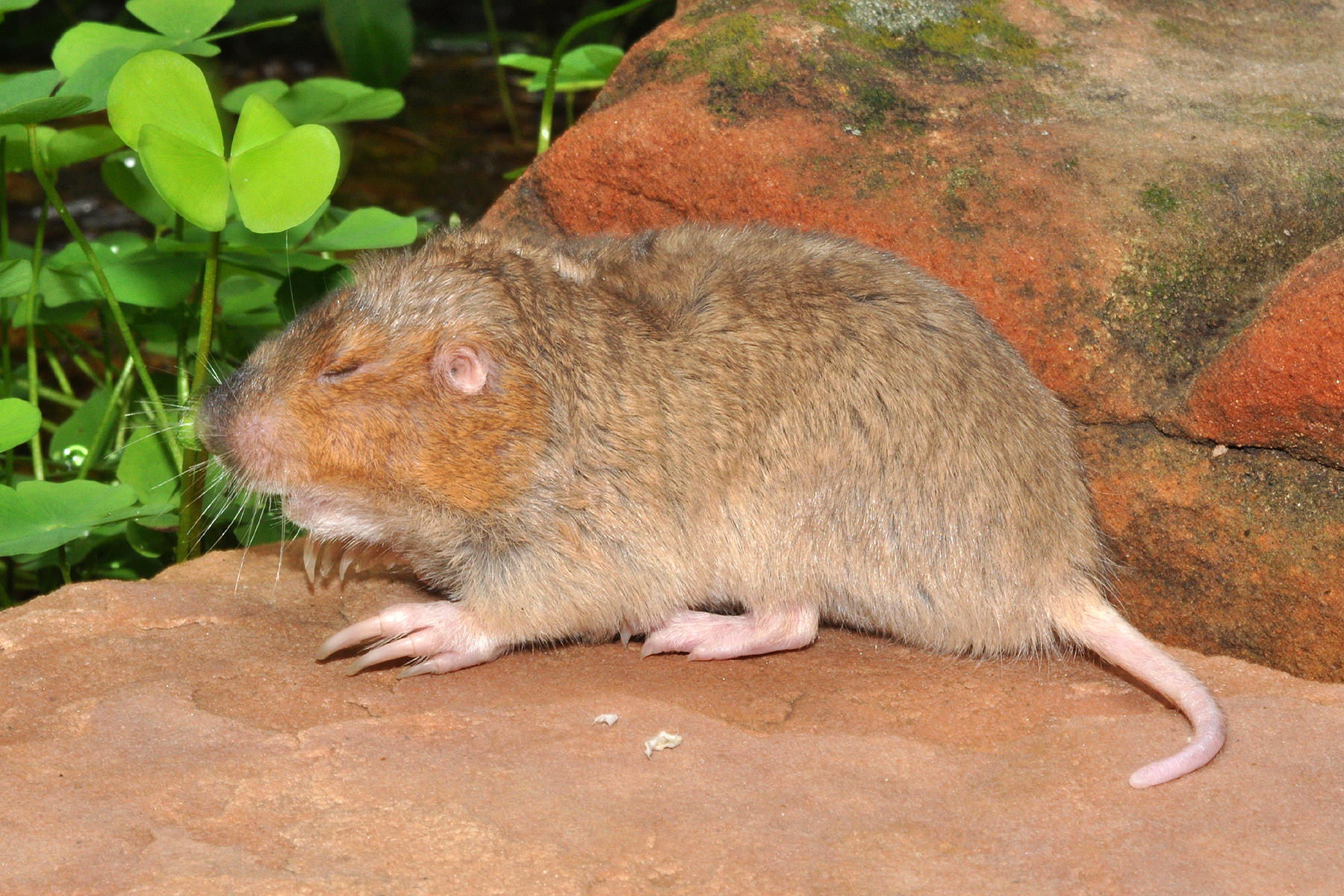
Attwater's pocket gopher (Geomys attwateri) from Colorado County, Texas, US

- Family Geomyidae
  - Genus Cratogeomys; some authors treat this genus as a subgenus of Pappogeomys.
    - Yellow-faced pocket gopher (Cratogeomys castanops)
    - Oriental Basin pocket gopher (C. fulvescens)
    - Smoky pocket gopher (C. fumosus)
    - Goldman's pocket gopher (C. goldmani)
    - Merriam's pocket gopher (C. merriami)
    - Perote pocket gopher (C. perotensis)
    - Volcan de Toluca pocket gopher (C. planiceps)
  - Genus Geomys – eastern pocket gophers; principally live in the southwestern United States, east of the Sierra Nevada mountains
    - Desert pocket gopher (Geomys arenarius)
    - Attwater's pocket gopher (G. attwateri)
    - Baird's pocket gopher (G. breviceps)
    - Plains pocket gopher (G. bursarius)
    - Hall's pocket gopher (G. jugossicularis)
    - Knox Jones's pocket gopher (G. knoxjonesi)
    - Sand Hills pocket gopher (G. lutescens)
    - Texas pocket gopher (G. personatus)
    - Southeastern pocket gopher (G. pinetis)
    - Strecker's pocket gopher (G. streckeri)
    - Central Texas pocket gopher (G. texensis)
    - Tropical pocket gopher (G. tropicalis)
  - Genus Heterogeomys – giant pocket gophers or taltuzas; live in Mexico, Central America, and Colombia; some authors treat this genus as a subgenus of Orthogeomys.
    - Chiriqui pocket gopher (Heterogeomys cavator)
    - Cherrie's pocket gopher (H. cherriei)
    - Darien pocket gopher (H. dariensis)
    - Variable pocket gopher (H. heterodus)
    - Hispid pocket gopher (H. hispidus)
    - Big pocket gopher (H. lanius)
    - Underwood's pocket gopher (H. underwoodi)
  - Genus Orthogeomys; live in Guatemala, Honduras, and Mexico;
    - Giant pocket gopher (O. grandis)
  - Genus Pappogeomys; live in Mexico
    - Buller's pocket gopher (P. bulleri)
  - Genus Thomomys – western pocket gophers; widely distributed in North America, extending into the northwestern US, Canada, and the southeastern US.
    - Black-and-Brown pocket gopher (T. atrovarius)
    - Botta's pocket gopher (T. bottae)
    - Camas pocket gopher (T. bulbivorus)
    - Wyoming pocket gopher (T. clusius)
    - Idaho pocket gopher (T. idahoensis)
    - Mazama pocket gopher (T. mazama)
    - Mountain pocket gopher (T. monticola)
    - Nayar pocket gopher (T. nayarensis)
    - Sierra Madre Occidental pocket gopher (T. sheldoni)
    - Northern pocket gopher (T. talpoides)
    - Townsend's pocket gopher (T. townsendii)
    - Southern pocket gopher (T. umbrinus)
  - Genus Zygogeomys
    - Michoacan pocket gopher (Zygogeomys trichopus)

Some sources also list a genus Hypogeomys, with one species, but this genus name is normally used for the Malagasy giant rat, which belongs to the family Nesomyidae.

== In popular culture ==
- Minnesota is nicknamed the "Gopher State", and the University of Minnesota's athletics teams are collectively known as the Golden Gophers, led by mascot Goldy Gopher. The Golden Gopher, however, refers to the Thirteen-lined ground squirrel, which is not a member of the Geomyidae family.
- Gopher is a recurring character in Disney's Winnie the Pooh franchise.
- A gopher puppet is featured prominently in the film Caddyshack and the sequel.
- The mascot of the Go programming language is the Go Gopher.
- Gordon the Gopher is an English puppet gopher that appeared on Children's BBC between 1985 and 1987.
- Mac and Tosh from the Looney Tunes franchise are a couple of extremely well mannered gophers.

== See also ==
- Mole
- Naked mole rat
