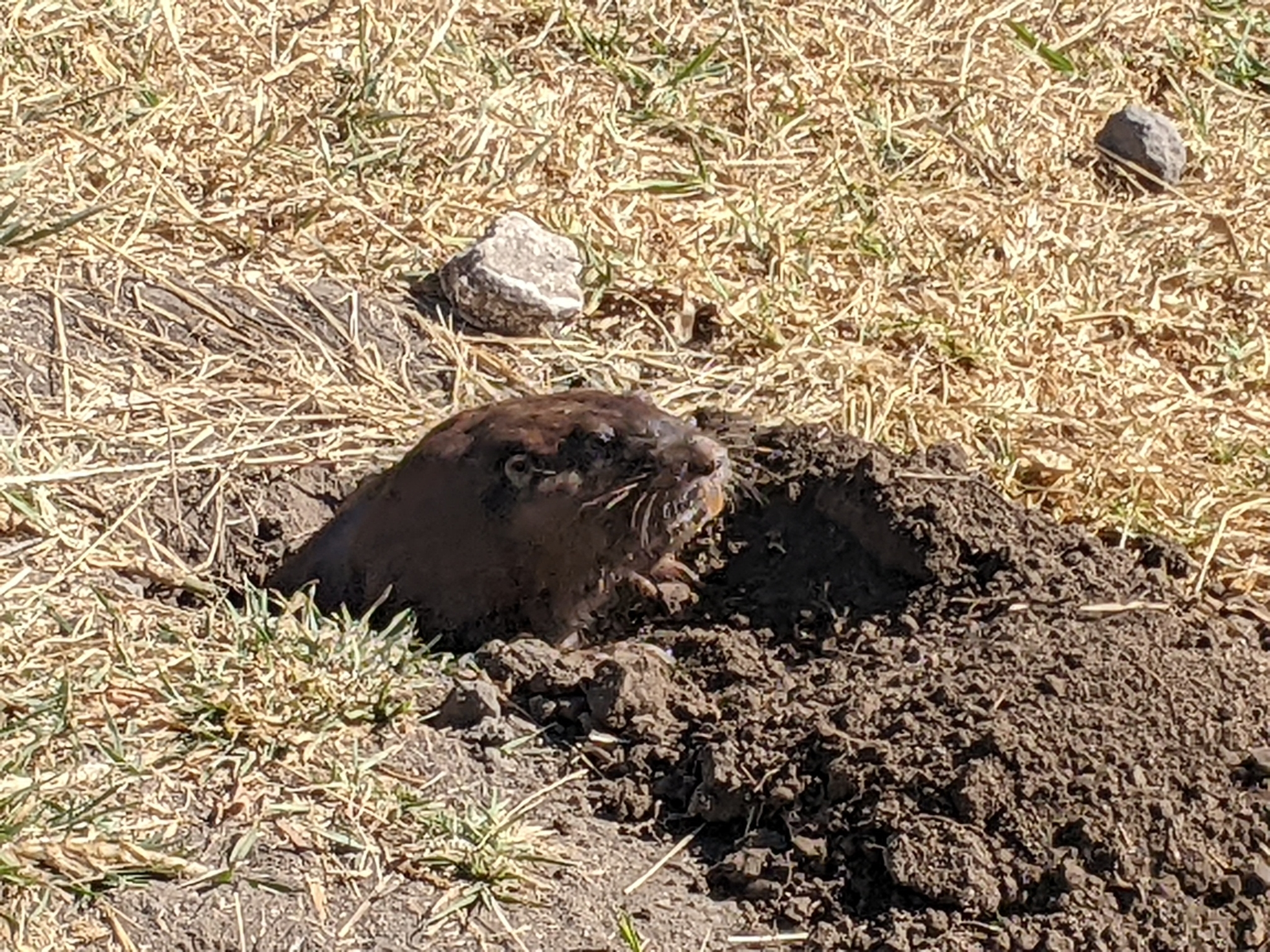

Conservation status
- Least Concern (IUCN 3.1)

Scientific classification
- Kingdom: Animalia
- Phylum: Chordata
- Class: Mammalia
- Infraclass: Placentalia
- Order: Rodentia
- Family: Geomyidae
- Genus: Cratogeomys
- Species: C. fumosus

Binomial name
- Cratogeomys fumosus (Merriam, 1892)
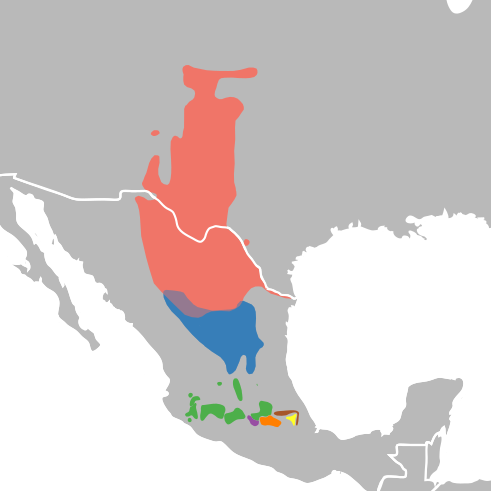
- Cratogeomys distribution C. fumosus in green

Synonyms
- Pappogeomys fumosus (Merriam, 1892); Cratogeomys neglectus (Merriam, 1902); Cratogeomys tylorhinus (Merriam, 1895); Cratogeomys zinseri (Goldman, 1939)

= Smoky pocket gopher =

Mexican Rodent

The smoky pocket gopher (Cratogeomys fumosus) is a species of rodent in the family Geomyidae. It is endemic to the Trans-Mexican Volcanic Belt in Mexico, in the states of Jalisco, Colima, Michoacan, Guanajuato, Queretaro, Hidalgo, Estado de Mexico, and the Mexican Federal District. Its natural habitat is subtropical or tropical dry lowland grassland. Molecular phylogenetics has revealed that this species also includes the animals formerly separated as C. gymnurus, C. neglectus, C. tylorhinus and C. zinseri.

Four subspecies are recognized:

- C. f. fumosus Merriam, 1892
- C. f. angustirostris Merriam, 1903
- C. f. imparilis Goldman 1939
- C. f. tylorhinus Merriam, 1895
