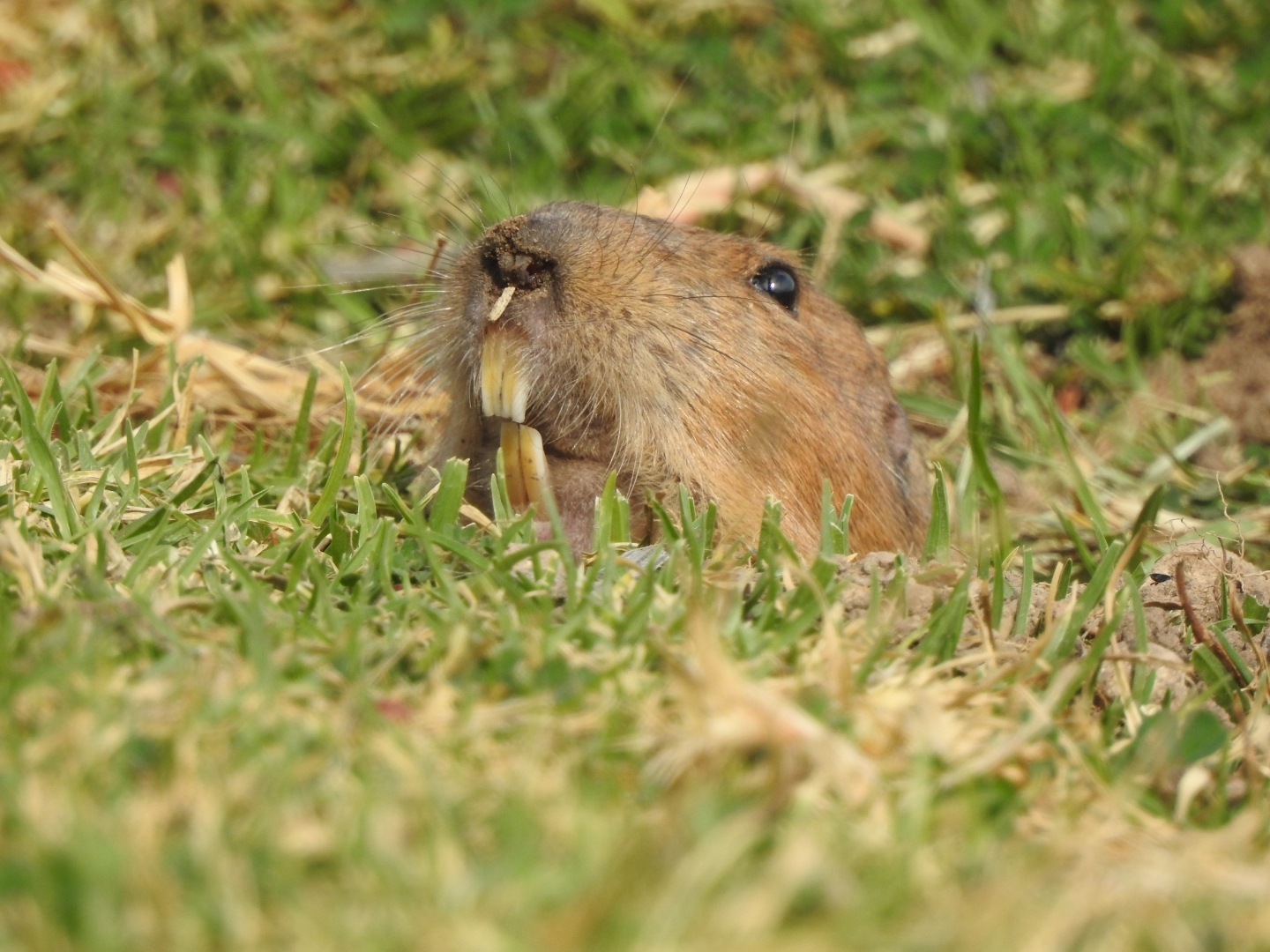
- Cratogeomys goldmani

Scientific classification
- Kingdom: Animalia
- Phylum: Chordata
- Class: Mammalia
- Infraclass: Placentalia
- Order: Rodentia
- Family: Geomyidae
- Genus: Cratogeomys; Merriam, 1895

Type species
- Geomys merriami Thomas, 1893
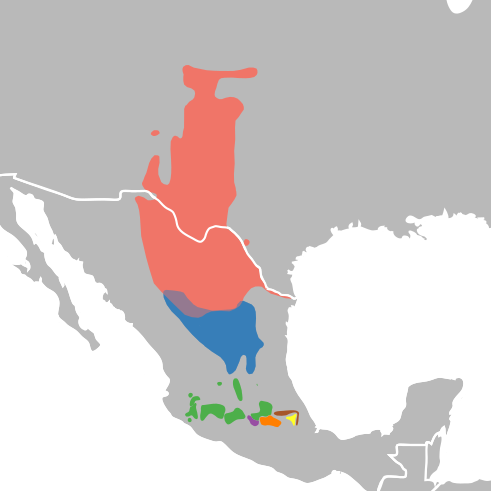
- Cratogeomys distribution C. castanops in red, C. fulvescens in yellow, C. fumosus in green, C. goldmani in blue (overlaps with castanops), C. merriami in orange, C. perotensis in brown, C. planiceps in purple

= Cratogeomys =

Genus of rodents

Cratogeomys is a genus of rodent in the family Geomyidae. It was previously considered a subgenus of Pappogeomys. All species are distributed in Mexico and the Southwest United States, with some species being found in both countries.

It contains the following seven species:

- Yellow-faced pocket gopher (Cratogeomys castanops)
- Oriental Basin pocket gopher (Cratogeomys fulvescens)
- Smoky pocket gopher (Cratogeomys fumosus)
- Goldman's pocket gopher (Cratogeomys goldmani)
- Merriam's pocket gopher (Cratogeomys merriami)
- Perote pocket gopher (Cratogeomys perotensis)
- Volcan de Toluca pocket gopher (Cratogeomys planiceps)
