= Daniel Giraud Elliot =

American zoologist (1835–1915)

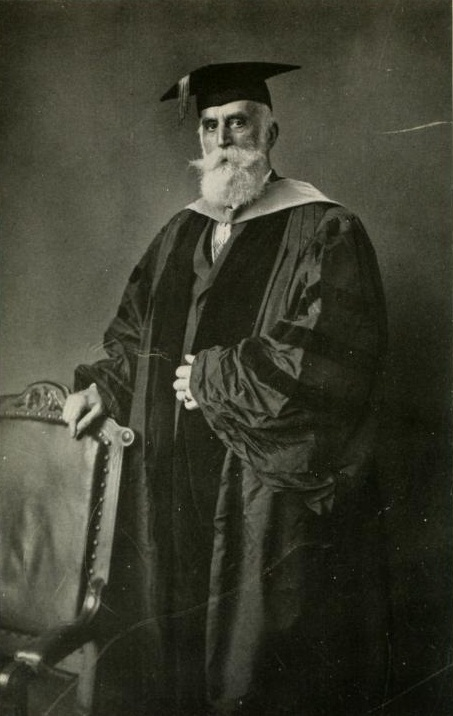
- Born: March 7, 1835; New York City
- Died: December 22, 1915 (aged 80); New York City
- Known for: A Monograph of the Phasianidae, A Monograph of the Paradiseidae or Birds of Paradise, A Monograph of the Felidae or Family of Cats, Review of the Primates
- Spouse: Ann Eliza Henderson (m. 1858)
- Children: 2
- Parent(s): George and Rebecca Elliot
- Scientific career
- Fields: Zoology
- Institutions: Field Museum, Chicago
- Author abbrev. (zoology): Elliot

Signature
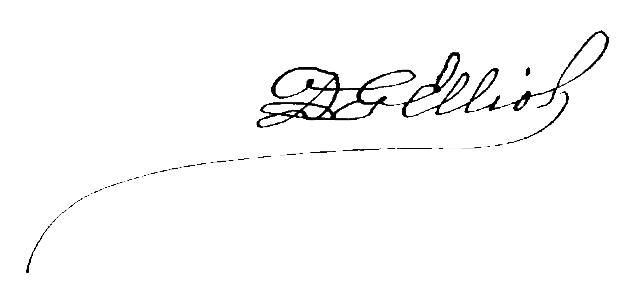

Daniel Giraud Elliot (March 7, 1835 – December 22, 1915) was a wealthy American zoologist and the founder of the American Ornithologist Union. He made expeditions to Africa and Alaska and was the first curator of zoology at the Field Museum in Chicago.

== Life ==
He was born in New York City on March 7, 1835, to George and Rebecca Elliot. In 1858, he married Ann Eliza Henderson.

From 1869 to 1879, he was in London and established strong links to British ornithologists and naturalists.

Elliot used his wealth to publish a series of sumptuous color-plate books on birds and other animals. Elliot wrote the text himself and commissioned artists such as Joseph Wolf and Joseph Smit, both of whom had worked for John Gould, to provide the illustrations. The books included A Monograph of the Phasianidae (Family of the Pheasants) (1870–72), A Monograph of the Paradiseidae or Birds of Paradise (1873), A Monograph of the Felidae or Family of Cats (1878) and Review of the Primates (1913).

In 1890, he was President of the American Ornithologists' Union. Elliot became the first curator of zoology at the Field Museum in Chicago, and in 1896, accompanied by Carl Akeley, led the museum's expedition to Somaliland, the first African zoological collecting expedition to be mounted by a North American museum.

In 1899, Elliot was invited to join the elite Harriman Alaska Expedition to study and document wildlife along the Alaskan coast.

Elliot was one of the founders of the American Museum of Natural History in New York City, of the American Ornithologists' Union and of the Société zoologique de France.

== Death ==
He died in New York City on December 22, 1915, of pneumonia.

== Legacy ==
The National Academy of Sciences awards the Daniel Giraud Elliot Medal "for meritorious work in zoology or paleontology published in a three- to five-year period. Established through the Daniel Giraud Elliot Fund by gift of Miss Margaret Henderson Elliot."

== Selected publications ==
- A monograph of the Paradiseidae or birds of paradise, by Elliot, Daniel Giraud, 1873
- Catalogue of a Collection of Birds Obtained by the Expedition into Somali-land (1897).
- The Gallinaceous Game Birds of North America, Including the Partridges, Grouse, Ptarmigan, and Wild Turkeys (1897).
- Accession Record, Zoology 141 (1897).
- Catalogue of Mammals from the Olympic Mountains, Washington, with Descriptions of New Species (1899).
- Description of an Apparently New Species of Mountain Goat (1900).
- The Caribou of the Kenai Peninsula, Alaska (1901).
- The Deer Family (1902, with Theodore Roosevelt, Theodore S. Van Dyke and A.J. Stone).
- Catalogue of Mammals Collected by E. Heller in Southern California (1904).
- The Land and Sea Mammals of Middle America and the West Indies (1904).
- A Check List of Mammals of the North American Continent, the West Indies and the Neighboring Seas (1905).
- A Catalogue of the Collection of Mammals in the Field Columbian Museum (1907).
- Review of the Primates, Volume I : Lemuroidea; Anthropoidea (Seniocebus to Saimiri) NY, 1912 Smithsonian Libraries

== Gallery ==
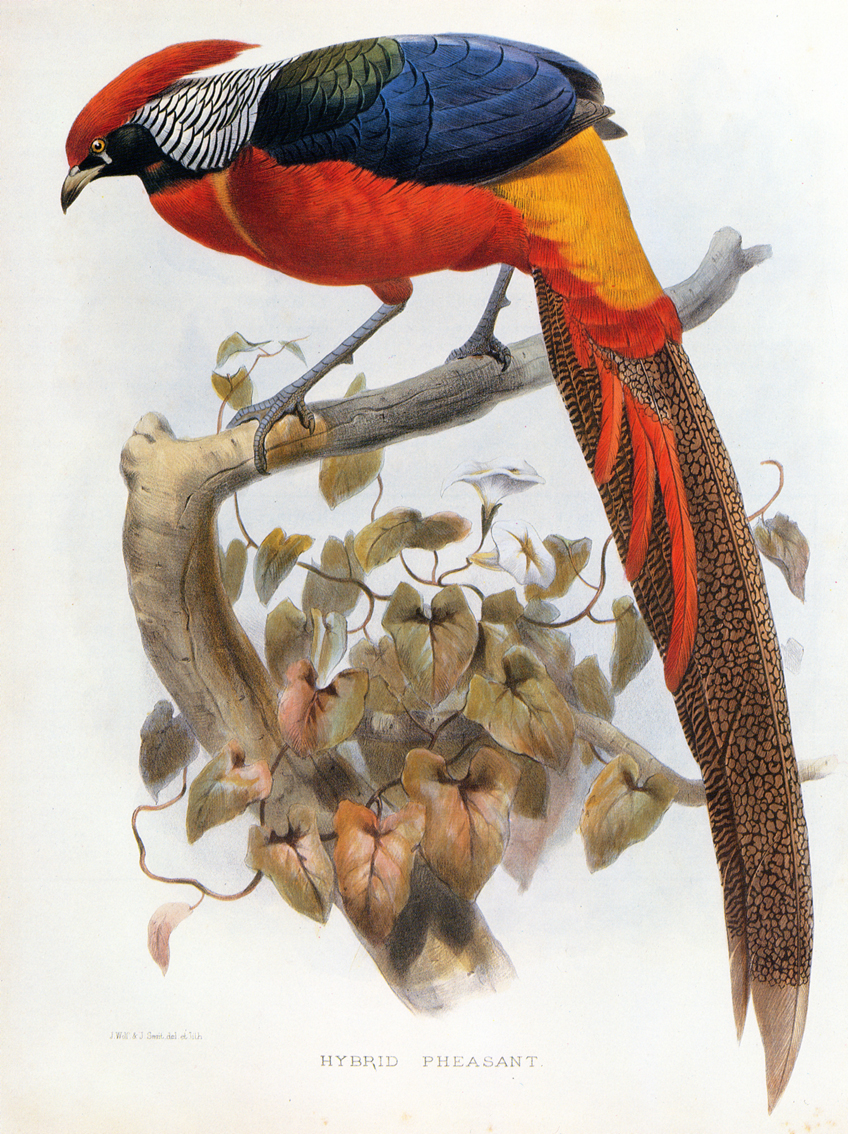
Hybrid pheasant Chrysolophus pictus × Chrysolophus amherstiae.

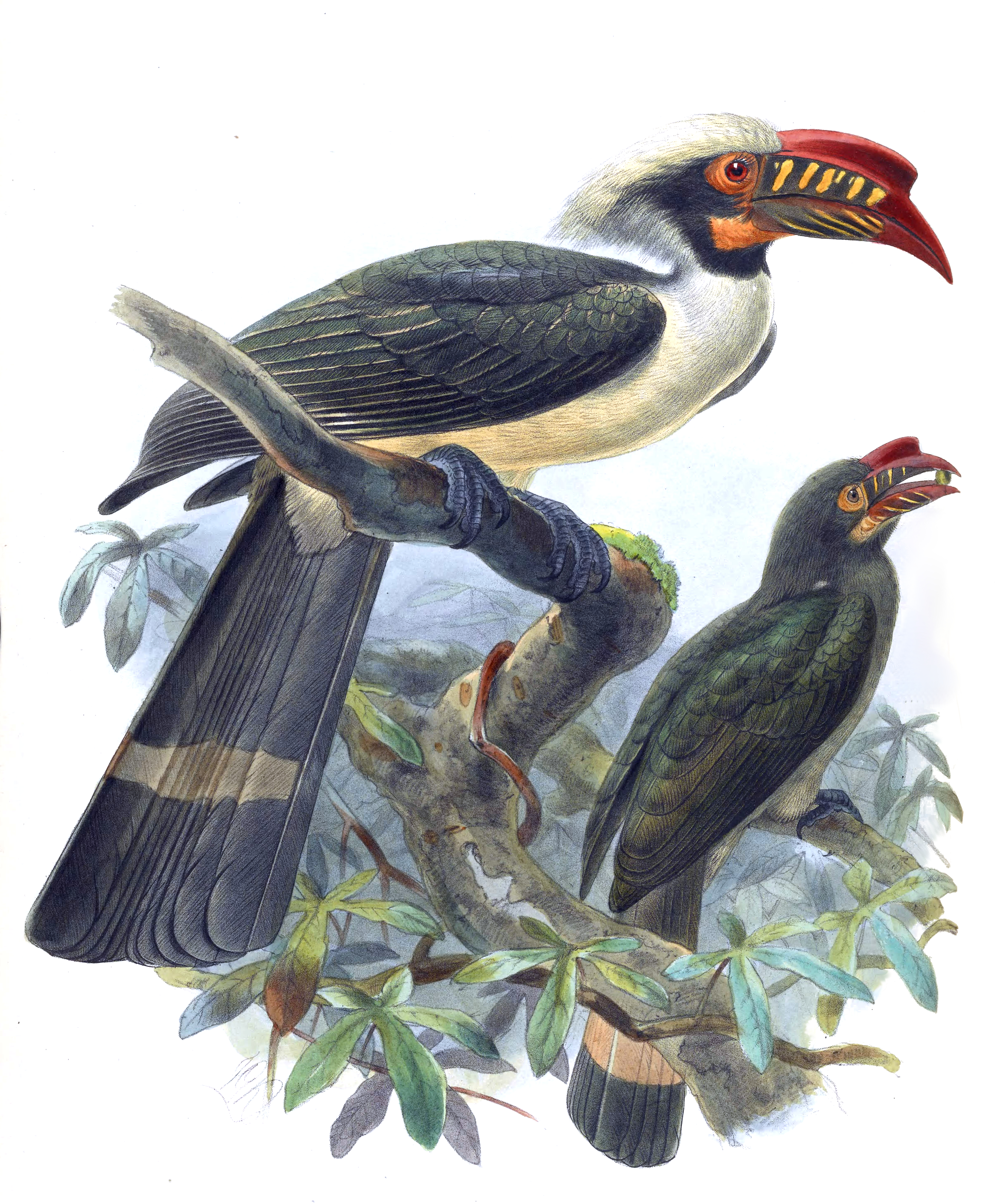
Penelopides manillae.

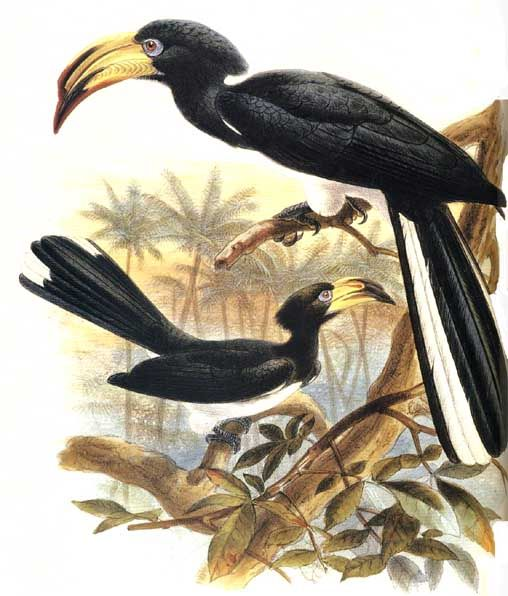
Tockus fasciatus.

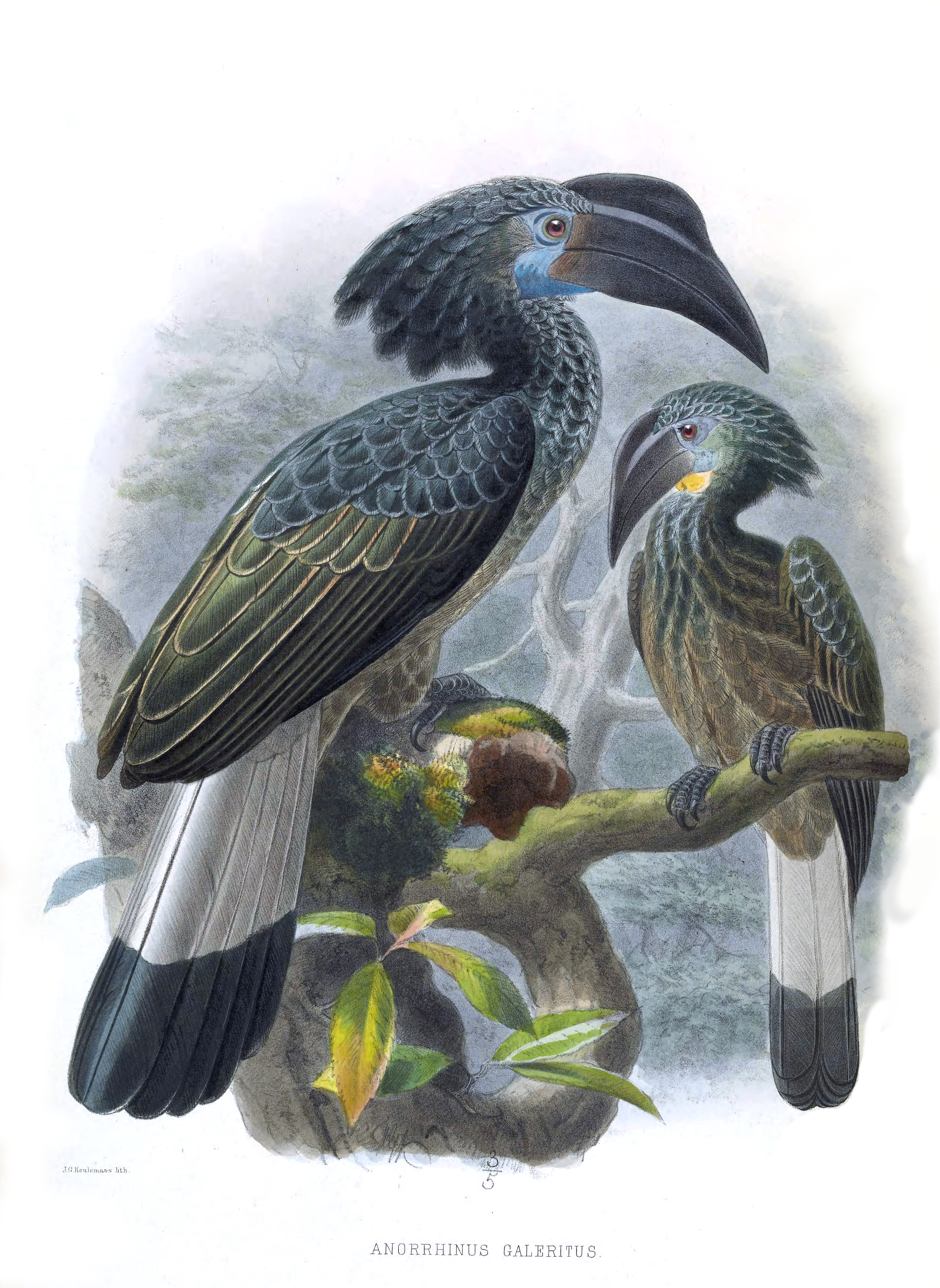
Anorrhinus galeritus.

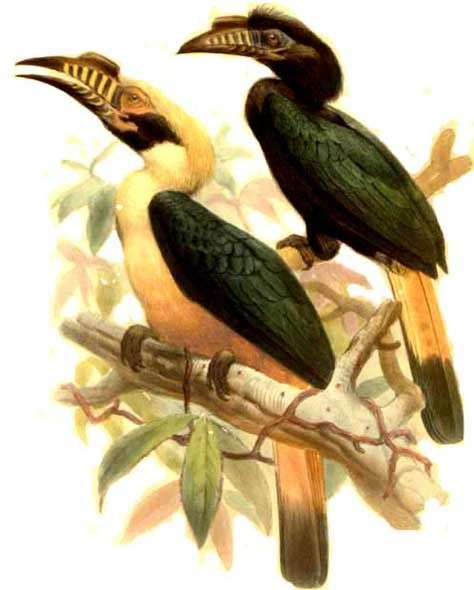
Penelopides panini.
