= Buller's pocket gopher =

Conservation status
- Least Concern (IUCN 3.1)

Scientific classification
- Kingdom: Animalia
- Phylum: Chordata
- Class: Mammalia
- Infraclass: Placentalia
- Order: Rodentia
- Family: Geomyidae
- Genus: Pappogeomys; Merriam, 1895
- Species: P. bulleri

Binomial name
- Pappogeomys bulleri (Thomas, 1892)
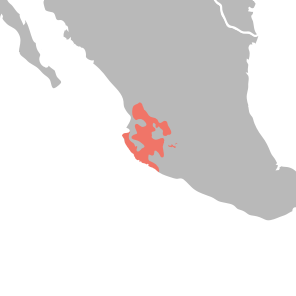
- Pappogeomys bulleri distribution

Synonyms
- Geomys bulleri Thomas, 1892; Pappogeomys alcorni Russell, 1957

Species of rodent

Buller's pocket gopher (Pappogeomys bulleri) is a species of gopher that is endemic to Mexico.

== Taxonomy ==
It is monotypic within the genus Pappogeomys. It includes the Alcorn's pocket gopher (P. b. alcorni) as a subspecies. Previously, this subspecies was considered a separate species.

== Description ==
Pappogeomys bulleri is endemic to west central Mexico. The total body length for this species is typically under 270 mm, and its body mass is typically under 250 g. The fur of P. bulleri can vary from a light shade of gray, to a darker shade depending on its geographic distribution and the tail, often naked and white, has a length that is half the head and body of this species. This pocket gopher is well adapted to burrowing, which is evident in the characteristic stocky build, fusiform shape, powerful jaws and incisors, large powerful forelimbs, and reduced hind limbs and hips often observed in this species. The diet of this species includes roots of xerophytic shrubs, grasses, and forbs.

== Habitat ==
The habitat dispersal of this species varies widely, ranging from forested highlands, mountain meadows, vegetated plains, and coastal lowlands including areas near sea level to above 3,000 m in elevation. P. bulleri can primarily be found in mountainous regions, inhabiting deep soils usually of volcanic origin. This species can also be found in semitropical environments where tropical shrubs can be used as a food source, as well as near propagated soil used for growing crops.

This species is highly successful in creating burrow systems that can be used for protection, both from environmental insults and predation, as well as for food storage and raising young. Burrows typically consist of a main passage which splits into many branches. Shallow tunnels near roots and other food sources are used for foraging, whereas the deeper tunnels are used as nesting sites and food storage. The average depth of a burrow inhabited by P. bulleri is 19.9 cm, with a mean tunnel diameter of 8.9 cm.
