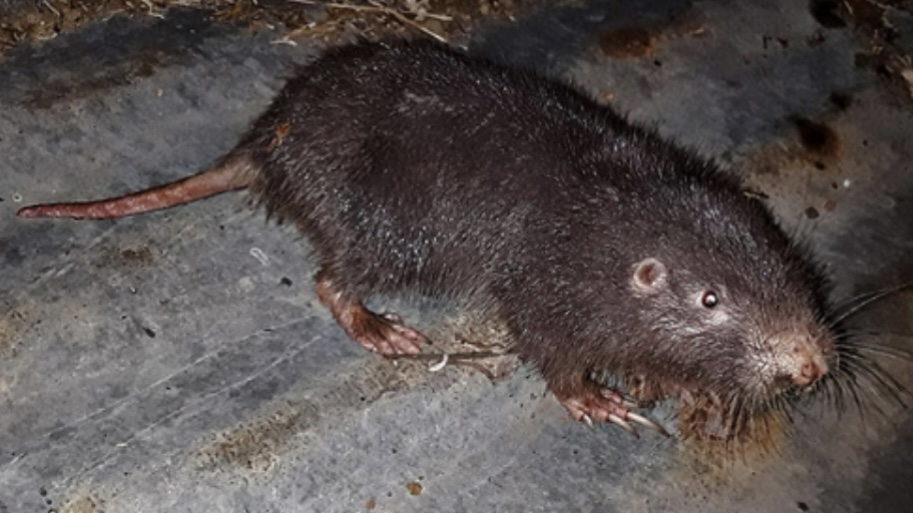

Conservation status
- Least Concern (IUCN 3.1)

Scientific classification
- Kingdom: Animalia
- Phylum: Chordata
- Class: Mammalia
- Infraclass: Placentalia
- Order: Rodentia
- Family: Geomyidae
- Genus: Orthogeomys; Merriam, 1895
- Species: O. grandis

Binomial name
- Orthogeomys grandis (Thomas, 1893)
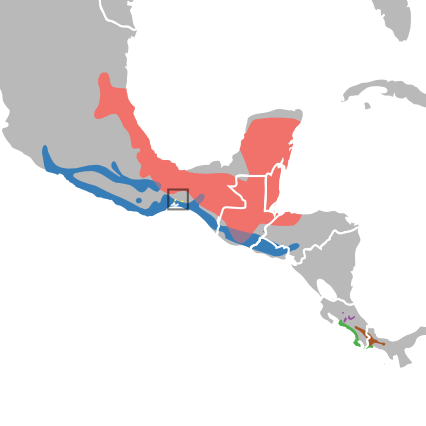
- Orthogeomys distribution O. grandis in blue

Synonyms
- Orthogeomys cuniculus Elliot, 1905

= Giant pocket gopher =

Species of rodent

The giant pocket gopher (Orthogeomys grandis), also known as the Oaxacan pocket gopher, is a species of rodent in the family Geomyidae. It is found in Mexico, Guatemala, El Salvador and Honduras. It is the type species of the genus Orthogeomys; some zoologists also include in this genus species that have recently been placed in Heterogeomys.

It is 22–30 cm (9–12 in) long, and 480–985 g (1–2 lb) in weight.
