= Takifugu chinensis =

Conservation status
- Critically Endangered (IUCN 3.1)

Scientific classification
- Kingdom: Animalia
- Phylum: Chordata
- Class: Actinopterygii
- Order: Tetraodontiformes
- Family: Tetraodontidae
- Genus: Takifugu
- Species: T. chinensis

Binomial name
- Takifugu chinensis (Abe, 1949)

Species of fish

Takifugu chinensis, the Chinese puffer, is a species of fish in the family Tetraodontidae (pufferfish) that is found in coastal waters of China, Japan and Korea. This critically endangered pufferfish has drastically declined because of overfishing and habitat loss, but it is possibly also threatened by the widespread release/escape of aquacultured Takifugu rubripes within its range. These two species are similar, very closely related and perhaps should be considered conspecific, but they do differ in the colour of their anal fins.
