= Takifugu orbimaculatus =

Scientific classification
- Domain: Eukaryota
- Kingdom: Animalia
- Phylum: Chordata
- Class: Actinopterygii
- Order: Tetraodontiformes
- Family: Tetraodontidae
- Genus: Takifugu
- Species: T. orbimaculatus

Binomial name
- Takifugu orbimaculatus Y. D. Kuang, C. S. Li & S. H. Liang, 1984

Fish species

Takifugu orbimaculatus is a species of pufferfish in the family Tetraodontidae. It is a freshwater species native to China that is known to be used medicinally. In 2009, it was determined that Takifugu orbimaculatus is likely to be very closely related to its congeners T. coronoidus and T. obscurus based on molecular phylogenetic analyses, with genetic differences between these species being almost comparable to those between individuals of the same species.

A species known as Takifugu fasciatus is also referenced in this review, although its validity is dubious, with many authorities not acknowledging it as a valid species.
