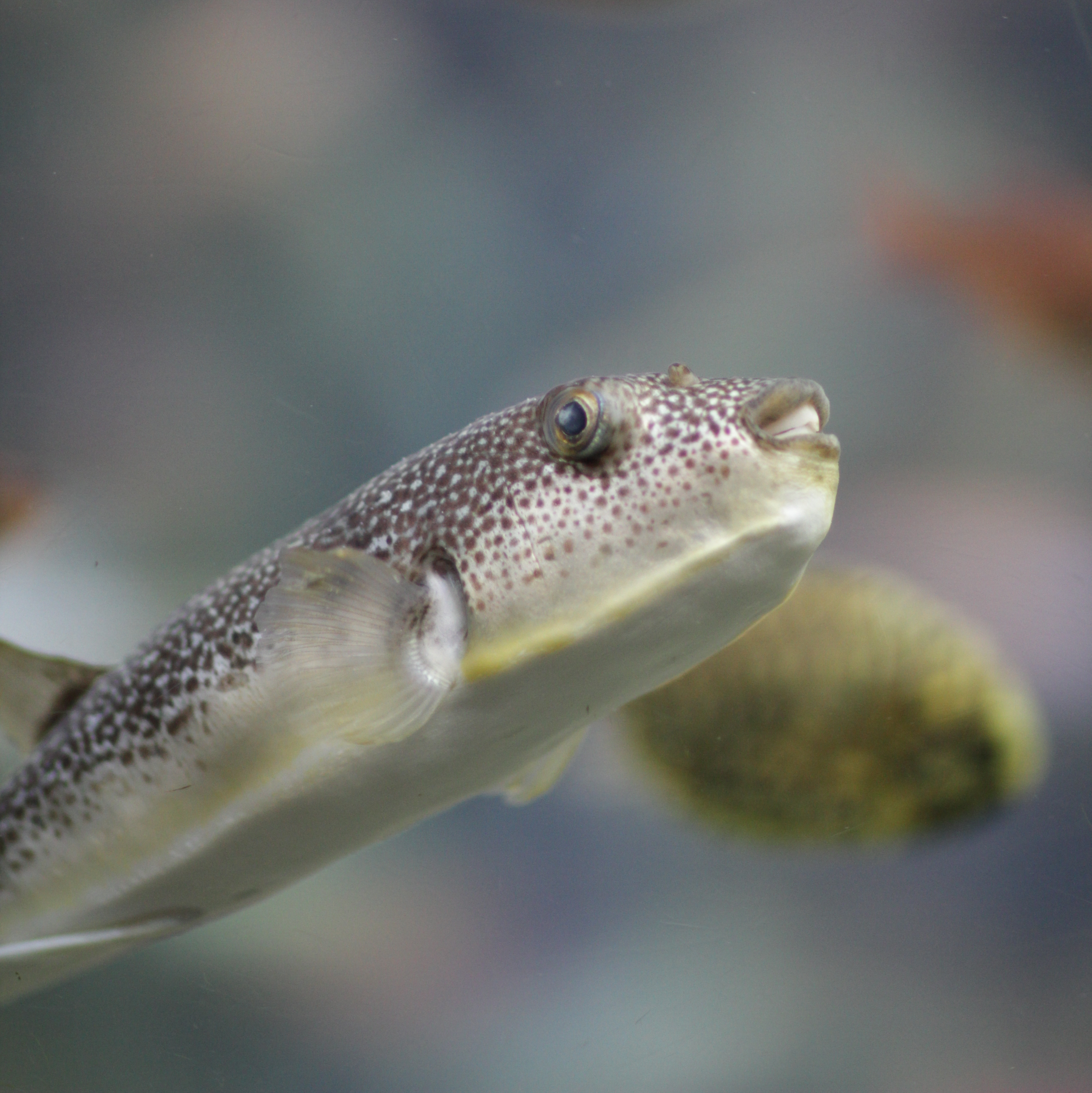

Scientific classification
- Kingdom: Animalia
- Phylum: Chordata
- Class: Actinopterygii
- Division: Teleostei
- Order: Tetraodontiformes
- Family: Tetraodontidae
- Genus: Takifugu
- Species: T. snyderi

Binomial name
- Takifugu snyderi (Abe, 1988)

Synonyms
- Fugu vermicularis snyderi

= Takifugu snyderi =

Species of pufferfish

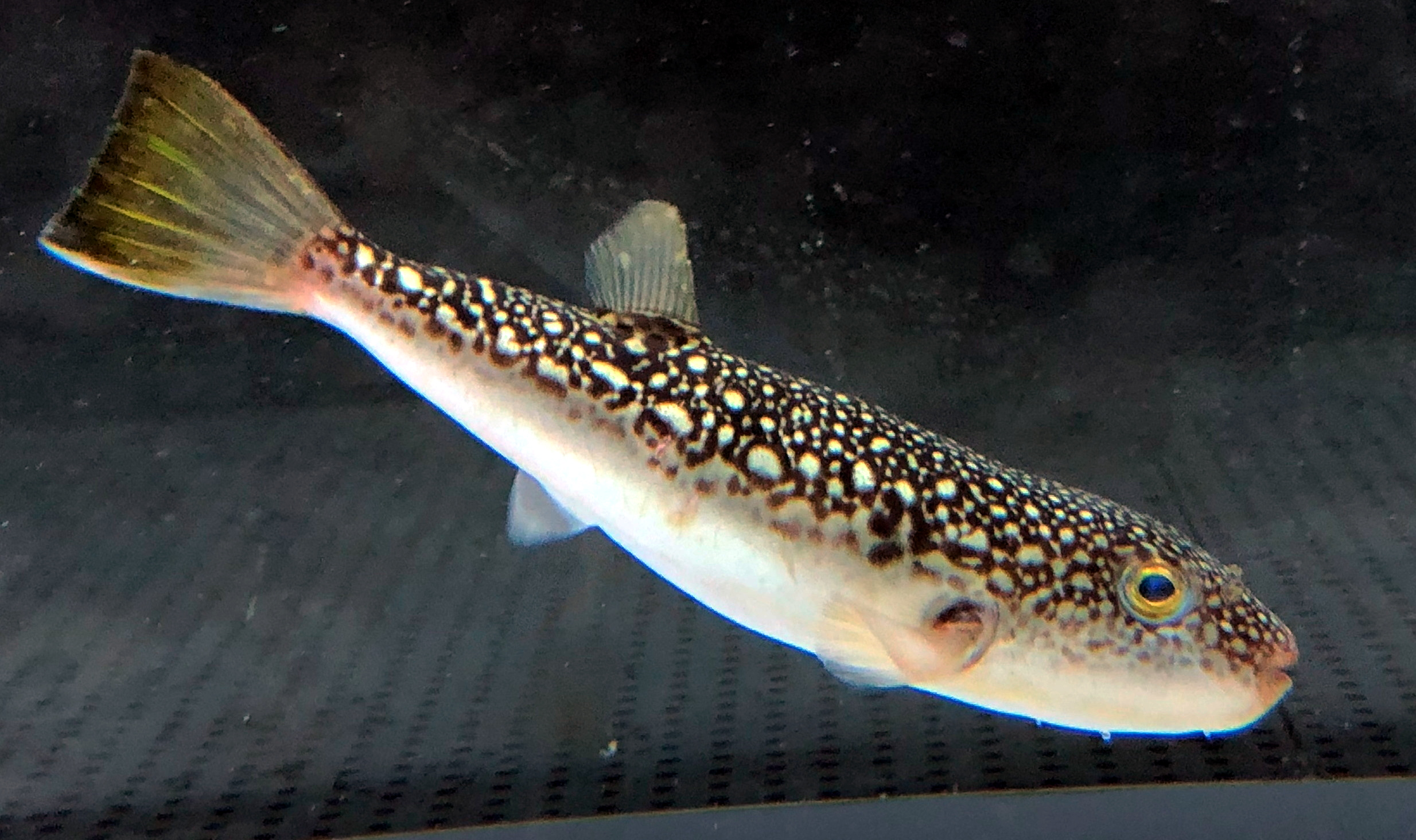
T. snyderi in an aquarium.

Takifugu snyderi, known as shōsai-fugu in Japanese, is a species of pufferfish in the family Tetraodontidae. It is a marine species native to Japan, the Yellow Sea, and the South China Sea. It is demersal and reaches 30 cm (11.8 inches) SL. While the ovaries, skin, liver, and intestines of the species are extremely toxic, the testes and flesh are thought to be less hazardous, and species of the genus Takifugu are frequently consumed as fugu.
