= T. vermicularis =

T. vermicularis may refer to:

- Takifugu vermicularis, the vermiculated puffer, a fish species found in Korea
- Thamnolia vermicularis, a lichen-forming fungus species
- Typhlops vermicularis, the European blind snake or worm snake, a reptile species found in Europe and Lebanon

== See also ==
- Vermicularis (disambiguation)
