= Takifugu bimaculatus =

Scientific classification
- Kingdom: Animalia
- Phylum: Chordata
- Class: Actinopterygii
- Order: Tetraodontiformes
- Family: Tetraodontidae
- Genus: Takifugu
- Species: T. bimaculatus

Binomial name
- Takifugu bimaculatus (Richardson, 1845)

Synonyms
- Tetrodon bimaculatus

Species of pufferfish

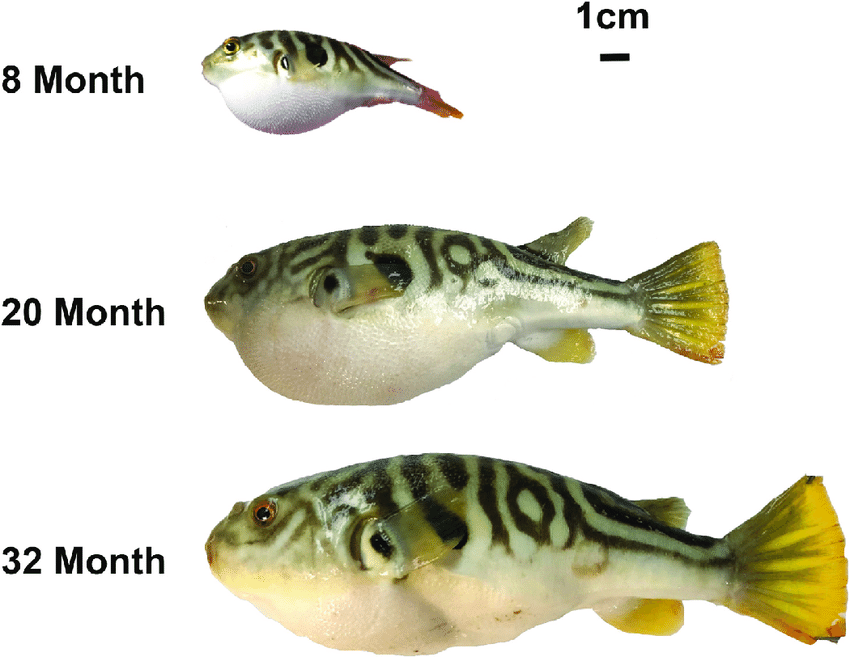
Takifugu bimaculatus stages of growth

Takifugu bimaculatus is a species of pufferfish in the family Tetraodontidae. It is a marine species native to the Northwest Pacific, where it is known from the South China Sea off Vietnam, the Yellow Sea, and the East China Sea. It is demersal and reaches 30 cm (11.8 inches) SL. It is known to be toxic, although pufferfish from the genus Takifugu are often prepared and consumed as fugu.
