= Hirezake =

Japanese traditional winter beverage

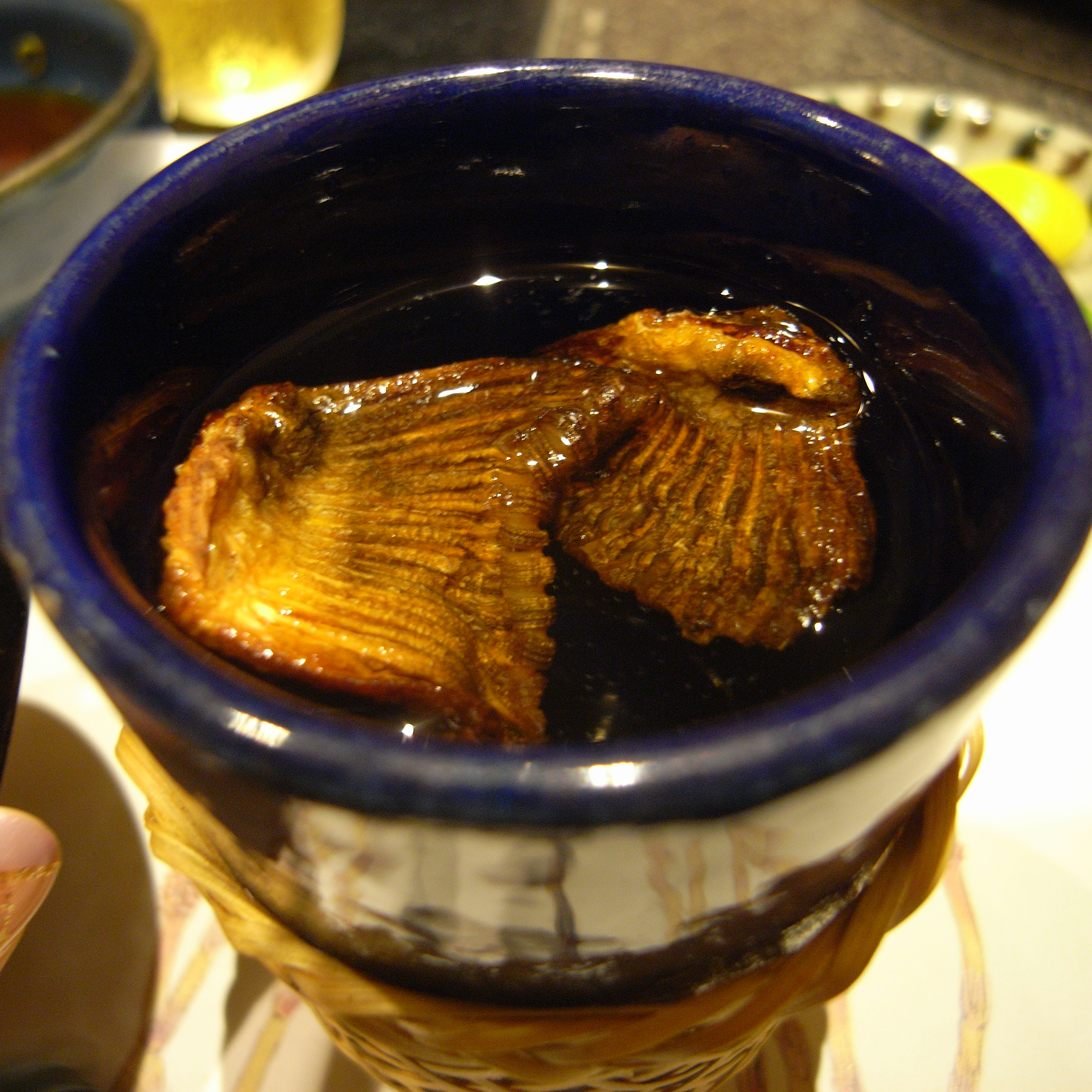
Fugu hirezake

In Japanese cuisine, hirezake (Japanese: 鰭酒, "fin sake") is a traditional winter drink of warmed sake to which the grilled fins of various food fish have been added. Most commonly this is the fin of fugu (pufferfish), but other fish such as ray or sea bream may also be used.

The fins are first dried, grilled over a low flame until golden brown, then placed in a cup. Warm sake is then poured over the fins and the cup covered for several minutes to allow the aroma of the fins to infuse the sake before drinking. A milder version of hirezake can be prepared by igniting the surface of the sake when the cover is removed to burn off some of the alcohol.
