= Takifugu radiatus =

Scientific classification
- Kingdom: Animalia
- Phylum: Chordata
- Class: Actinopterygii
- Division: Teleostei
- Order: Tetraodontiformes
- Family: Tetraodontidae
- Genus: Takifugu
- Species: T. radiatus

Binomial name
- Takifugu radiatus (Abe, 1947)

Synonyms
- Sphoeroides vermicularis radiatus

Species of pufferfish

Takifugu radiatus is a species of pufferfish in the family Tetraodontidae. It is native to the Northwest Pacific, where it ranges from Kyushu to the East China Sea. It is a demersal species that reaches 20 cm (7.9 inches) SL.
