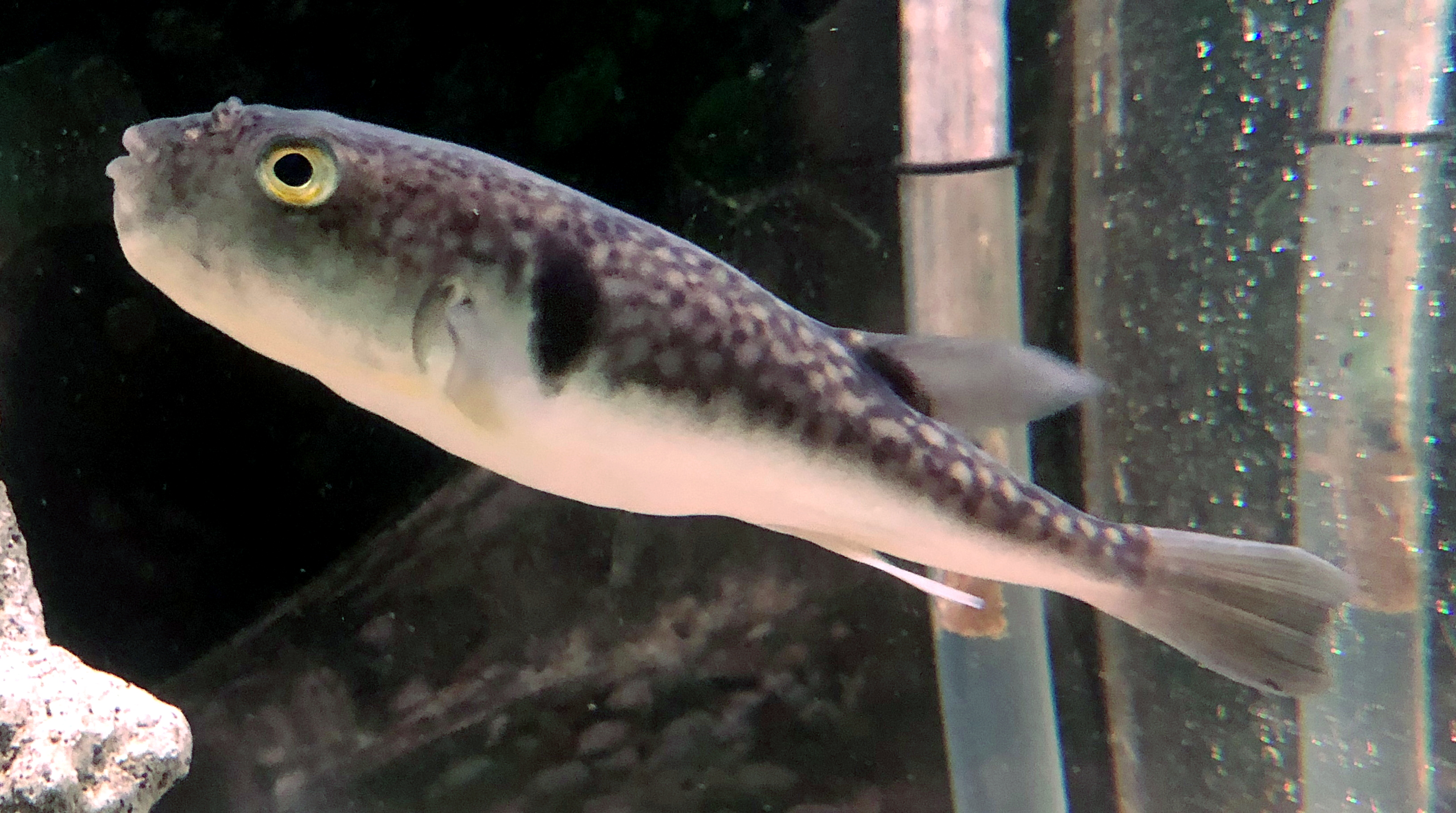

Scientific classification
- Domain: Eukaryota
- Kingdom: Animalia
- Phylum: Chordata
- Class: Actinopterygii
- Order: Tetraodontiformes
- Family: Tetraodontidae
- Genus: Takifugu
- Species: T. porphyreus

Binomial name
- Takifugu porphyreus (Temminck & Schlegel, 1850)

Synonyms
- Fugu vermiculare porphyreum; Fugu vermicularis porphyreus; Spheroides borealis; Tetraodon porphyreus

= Takifugu porphyreus =

Species of pufferfish

Takifugu porphyreus, known as the purple puffer, is a species of pufferfish in the family Tetraodontidae. It is native to the Northwest Pacific, where it ranges from Hokkaido to the East China Sea. It is a demersal species found in the littoral zone that reaches 52 cm (20.5 inches) in total length. While parts of the fish are highly toxic, it is frequently consumed as fugu in Japan.
