= Takifugu flavidus =

Scientific classification
- Domain: Eukaryota
- Kingdom: Animalia
- Phylum: Chordata
- Class: Actinopterygii
- Order: Tetraodontiformes
- Family: Tetraodontidae
- Genus: Takifugu
- Species: T. flavidus

Binomial name
- Takifugu flavidus (Li, Wang & Wang, 1975)

Synonyms
- Fugu flavidus

Species of pufferfish

Takifugu flavidus, commonly known as the yellowbelly pufferfish, is a species of pufferfish in the family Tetraodontidae. It is native to the Yellow Sea, the East China Sea, and the Bohai Sea, where it is found near shore. It a demersal species that reaches 35 cm (13.8 inches) SL. It is reported to be dangerously toxic to humans, although poisonous pufferfish are frequently prepared as fugu and consumed.
