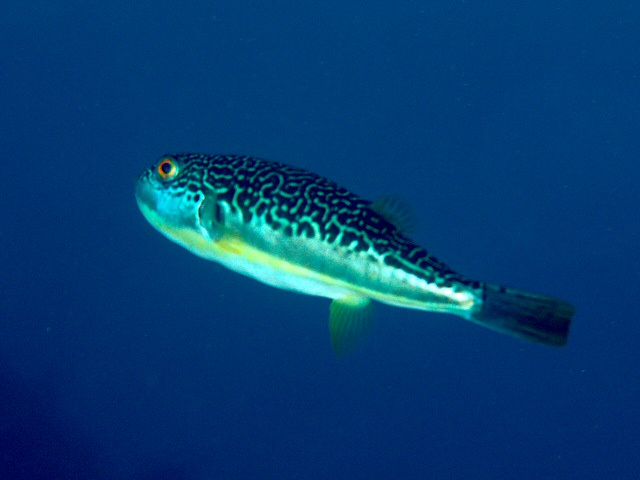

Scientific classification
- Kingdom: Animalia
- Phylum: Chordata
- Class: Actinopterygii
- Order: Tetraodontiformes
- Family: Tetraodontidae
- Genus: Takifugu
- Species: T. exascurus

Binomial name
- Takifugu exascurus (Jordan & Snyder, 1901)

Synonyms
- Sphoeroides exascurus

= Takifugu exascurus =

Species of pufferfish

Takifugu exascurus is a species of pufferfish in the family Tetraodontidae. It is a marine species native to the Northwest Pacific, where it occurs in the waters surrounding Japan, including the Sea of Japan. It reaches 15 cm (5.9 inches) SL and is known as ムシフグ (Mushifugu) in Japanese.
