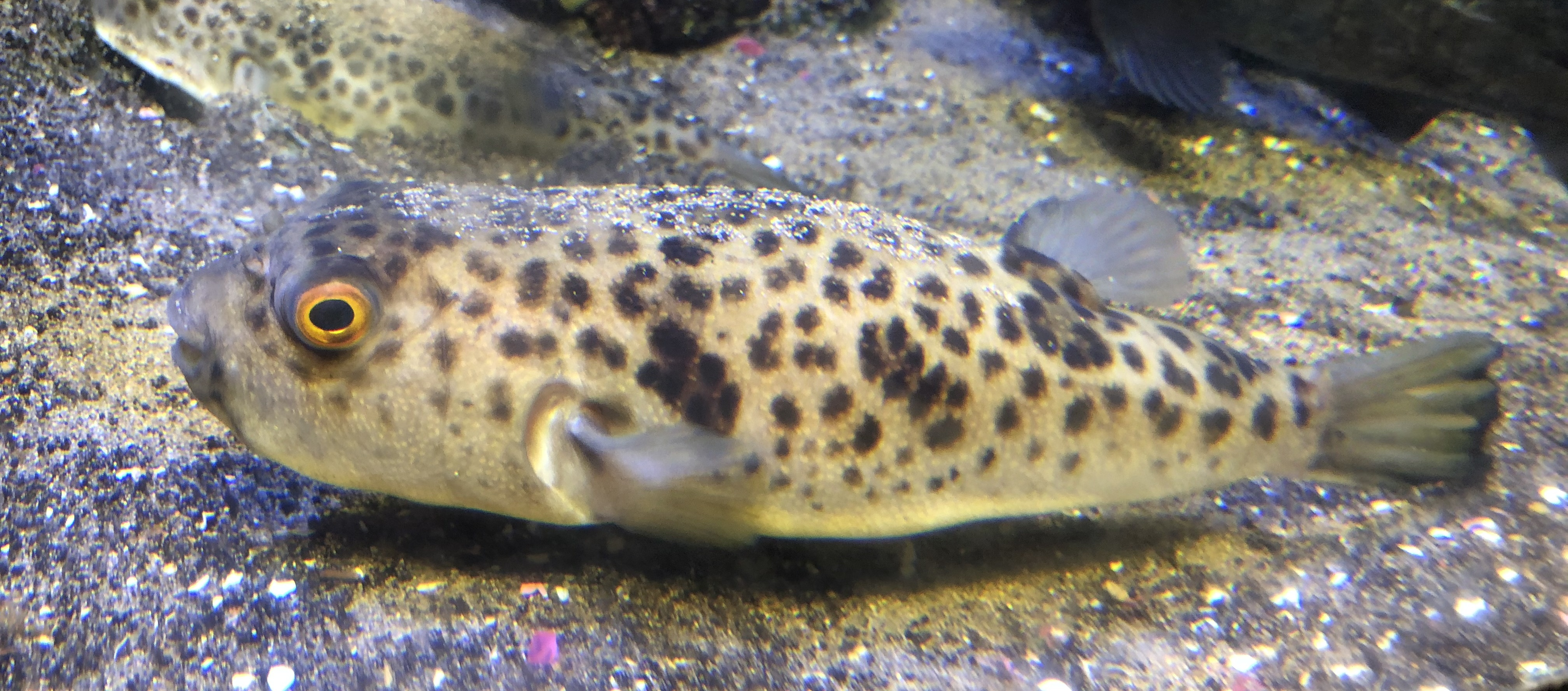

Scientific classification
- Domain: Eukaryota
- Kingdom: Animalia
- Phylum: Chordata
- Class: Actinopterygii
- Order: Tetraodontiformes
- Family: Tetraodontidae
- Genus: Takifugu
- Species: T. pardalis

Binomial name
- Takifugu pardalis (Temminck & Schlegel, 1850)

Synonyms
- Fugu pardalis; Sphoeroides pardalis; Tetraodon pardalis

= Takifugu pardalis =

Fish species

Takifugu pardalis, known as the panther puffer, is a species of pufferfish in the family Tetraodontidae. It is a marine species native to the Northwest Pacific, where it ranges from Hakodate in Japan to the Yellow Sea and the East China Sea. It is demersal, occurring in coastal rocky areas, and reaches 30 cm (11.8 inches) SL. It is known to be poisonous. Both the scientific and common name of this species reference its distinctive spotted pattern, which resembles that of a leopard.
