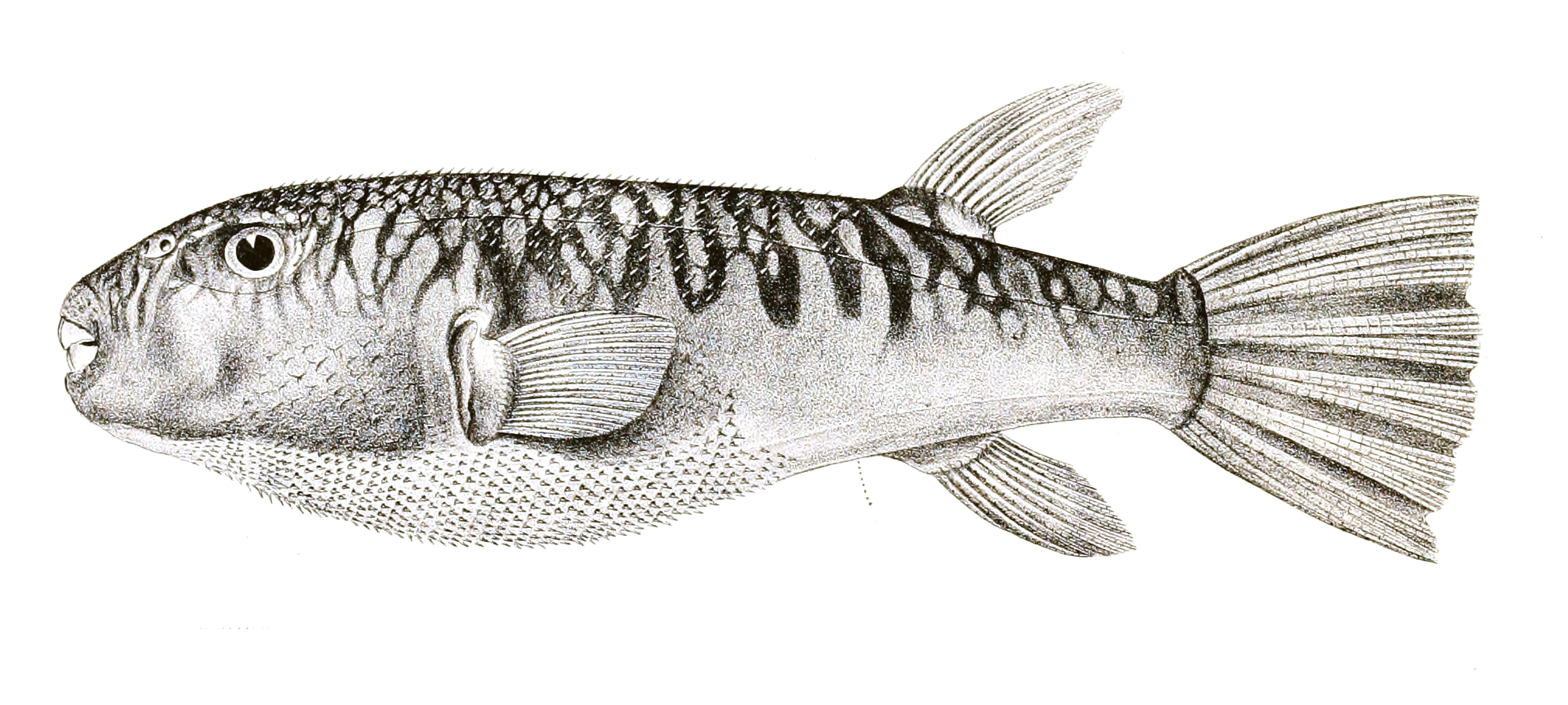

Scientific classification
- Domain: Eukaryota
- Kingdom: Animalia
- Phylum: Chordata
- Class: Actinopterygii
- Order: Tetraodontiformes
- Family: Tetraodontidae
- Genus: Takifugu
- Species: T. oblongus

Binomial name
- Takifugu oblongus (Bloch, 1786)

Synonyms
- Tetraodon waandersii; Fugu oblongus; Sphaeroides oblongus; Sphoeroides oblongus; Takyfugu oblongus; Tetraodon oblongus; Tetrodon oblongus; Torquigener oblongus

= Takifugu oblongus =

Fish species

Takifugu oblongus, known as the oblong blowfish or lattice blaasop, is a species of pufferfish in the family Tetraodontidae. It is native to the Indo-Pacific, where it ranges from South Africa to Indonesia, Japan, and Australia. It lives primarily in coastal marine environments, although it is known to enter brackish water. The species reaches 40 cm (15.8 inches) SL.
