= Takifugu plagiocellatus =

Conservation status
- Endangered (IUCN 3.1)

Scientific classification
- Domain: Eukaryota
- Kingdom: Animalia
- Phylum: Chordata
- Class: Actinopterygii
- Order: Tetraodontiformes
- Family: Tetraodontidae
- Genus: Takifugu
- Species: T. plagiocellatus

Binomial name
- Takifugu plagiocellatus C. S. Li in Su & Li, 2002

Species of pufferfish

Takifugu plagiocellatus is a species of pufferfish in the genus Takifugu. It is endemic to the coastal waters of southeastern Hainan.

== Description and habitat ==
It was discovered in 2002 in Xincun, Hainan from four specimens. It is a demersal species that reaches 11 cm (4.3 inches). It is capable of inflating its abdomens with water when frightened or disturbed and are capable of producing and accumulating toxins such as tetrodotoxin and saxitoxin in the skin, gonads, and liver like other species of pufferfish. The oblique striped pufferfish is found in shallow coastal waters that have coral reefs or seagrass.

== Threats ==
The species is endangered due to over-fishing, environmental degradation such as pollution, and the negative genetic effects of released cultured pufferfish on the wild populations.
