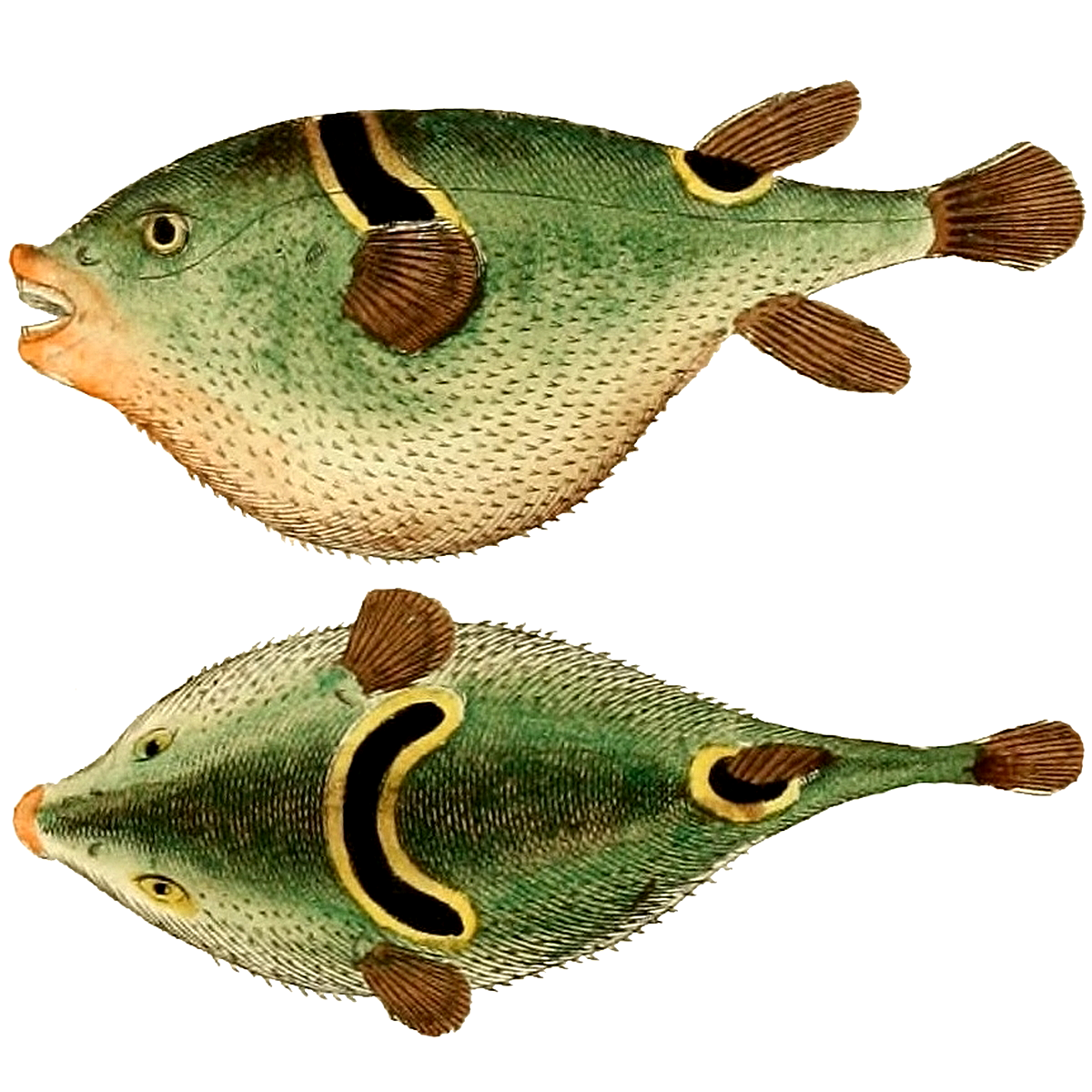

Conservation status
- Near Threatened (IUCN 3.1)

Scientific classification
- Kingdom: Animalia
- Phylum: Chordata
- Class: Actinopterygii
- Order: Tetraodontiformes
- Family: Tetraodontidae
- Genus: Takifugu
- Species: T. ocellatus

Binomial name
- Takifugu ocellatus (Linnaeus, 1758)

Synonyms
- Gastrophysus ocellatus; Tetraodon ocellatus; Tetrodon conspicillum

= Takifugu ocellatus =

Species of anadromous pufferfish

Takifugu ocellatus, sometimes known as the ocellated puffer or the orange-saddle puffer, is a species of anadromous pufferfish in the family Tetraodontidae. It is native to China and Vietnam. Juveniles of the species occur in brackish and freshwater environments, but adults are marine. This species is noted to be fatally poisonous to humans if consumed. It reaches 15 cm (5.9 inches) in total length.
