= Takifugu variomaculatus =

Scientific classification
- Kingdom: Animalia
- Phylum: Chordata
- Class: Actinopterygii
- Division: Teleostei
- Order: Tetraodontiformes
- Family: Tetraodontidae
- Genus: Takifugu
- Species: T. variomaculatus

Binomial name
- Takifugu variomaculatus C. S. Li & Y. D. Kuang, 2002

Species of pufferfish

Takifugu variomaculatus is a species of pufferfish in the family Tetraodontidae. It is native to the Northwest Pacific, where it is known from China. It is a demersal species that reaches 13.7 cm (5.4 inches) SL.
