= Takifugu pseudommus =

Scientific classification
- Domain: Eukaryota
- Kingdom: Animalia
- Phylum: Chordata
- Class: Actinopterygii
- Order: Tetraodontiformes
- Family: Tetraodontidae
- Genus: Takifugu
- Species: T. pseudommus

Binomial name
- Takifugu pseudommus (Chu, 1935)

Synonyms
- Lagocephalus pseudommus; Takifugu pseudomus

Species of pufferfish

Takifugu pseudommus is a species of pufferfish in the family Tetraodontidae. It is native to the Northwest Pacific, where it is known from the Yellow Sea and the East China Sea. It is a demersal species that reaches 35 cm (13.8 inches) SL, and it is reported to be poisonous.
