= Shanghai Fugu Agreement =

Fictional document used in a 1984 political prank in Hesse, Germany

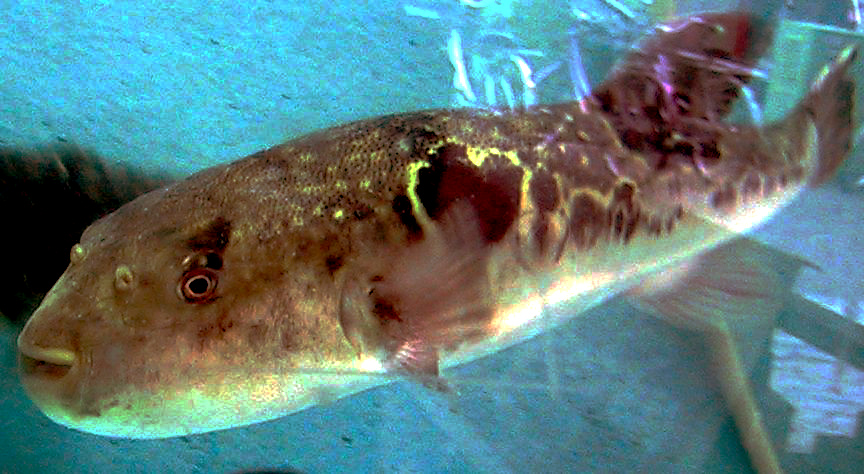
A specimen of fugu

The Shanghai Fugu Agreement (German: Shanghaier Kugelfisch-Abkommen) is a fictional document and was referred to in a successful 1984 political prank played on the Social Democrats in the German state of Hesse.

In 1984 the new Green Party prepared to enter into a German state government for the first time in its history. The first Green cabinet minister in German history was going to be Joschka Fischer who later became minister of Foreign Affairs in the German Federal Government under Chancellor Gerhard Schröder. The 1984 Hesse coalition under minister-president Holger Börner was to be based on an official policy agreement negotiated by both parties.

In this agreement it is stated: "Die Fälle der Koppelung von Arbeits- und Aufenthaltserlaubnis werden übereinstimmend als erledigt betrachtet (Shanghaier Kugelfischabkommen vom 3.11.1974)." (page 108, section 2.4; engl. "The cases of coupling work and residence permits are considered to be resolved (Shanghai Fugu Agreement of 3.11.1974).")

Later, the Green party provided an explanation how this text found its way into the official document: During a final night session of the negotiations the Greens presented a demand that Hesse join the "Shanghai Fugu Agreement". This was accepted by their tired Social Democratic counterparts and became official state policy. The Greens argued that the fugu fish were well known to be a dangerous delicacy requiring specialized chefs who mostly came from Asia. Due to expanding restrictions on work permits restaurants had found it difficult to employ such specialists. The "Shanghai Fugu Agreement" was supposed to provide special regulations for certified fugu chefs internationally.

While it is true that chefs in Japan require certification to handle the fish, the agreement was entirely fictional, as fugu is not served in Germany at all. However, neither was it discovered to be a joke by the Social Democrats during the nightly negotiations, nor later by civil servants or the press who went through the coalition contracts. It took years before the Agreement was revealed to be a joke.

== Sources ==
- Das Shanghaier Kugelfisch-Abkommen (in German) (Newsletter, Green parliamentary group in the Hesse parliament, Fraktionsgrün Nr. 1, May 2004, p. 4)
- Obituary for the deceased Holger Börner in the regional daily "Giessener Anzeiger" of 03.08.2006 (in German) (mentioning the Fugu Agreement ("Kugelfischabkommen") in § 6)
