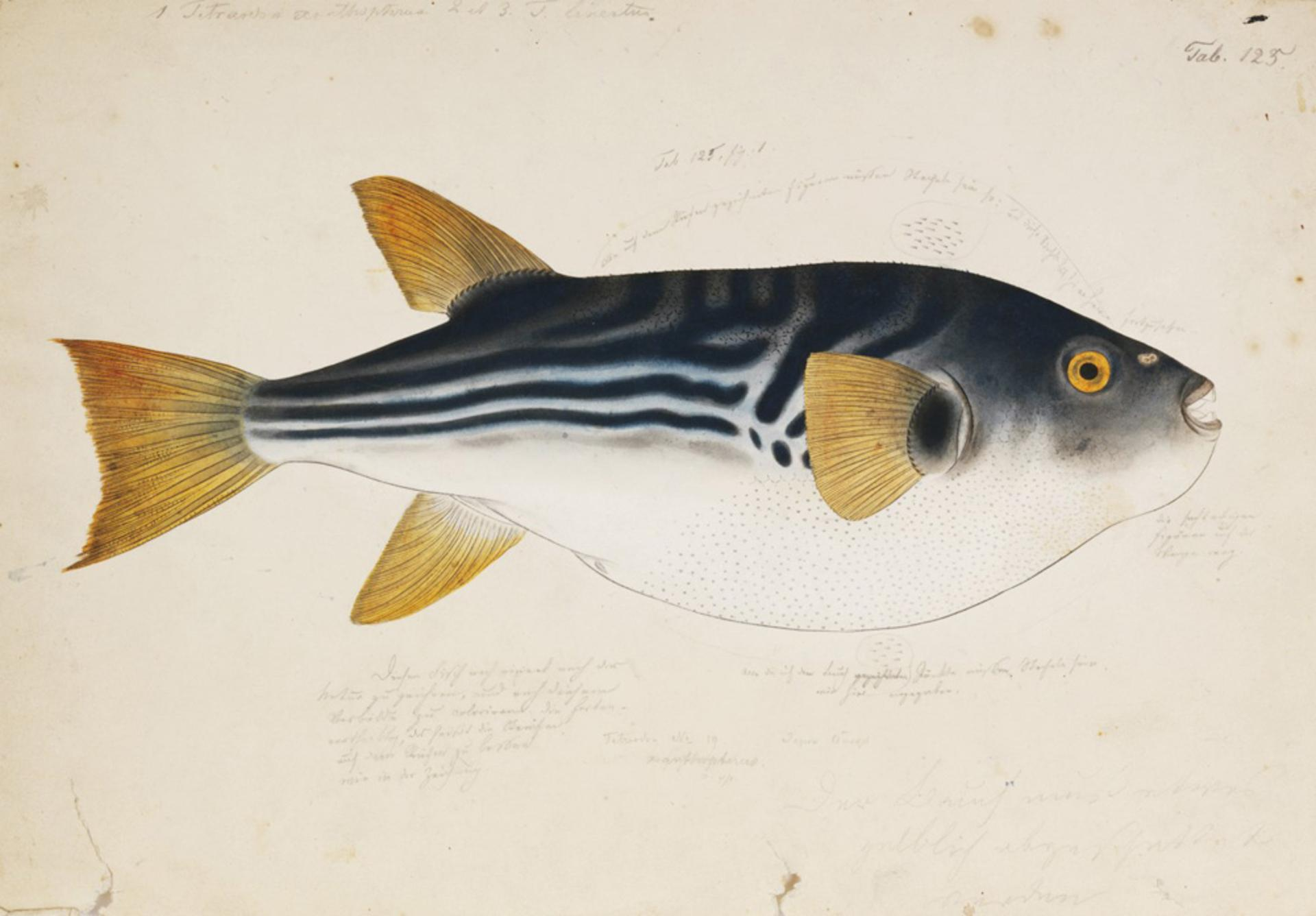

Conservation status
- Least Concern (IUCN 3.1)

Scientific classification
- Kingdom: Animalia
- Phylum: Chordata
- Class: Actinopterygii
- Order: Tetraodontiformes
- Family: Tetraodontidae
- Genus: Takifugu
- Species: T. xanthopterus

Binomial name
- Takifugu xanthopterus (Temminck & Schlegel, 1850)

= Takifugu xanthopterus =

Species of fish

Takifugu xanthopterus is a species of fish in the family Tetraodontidae. It is found in Hong Kong, Japan, and Taiwan.
