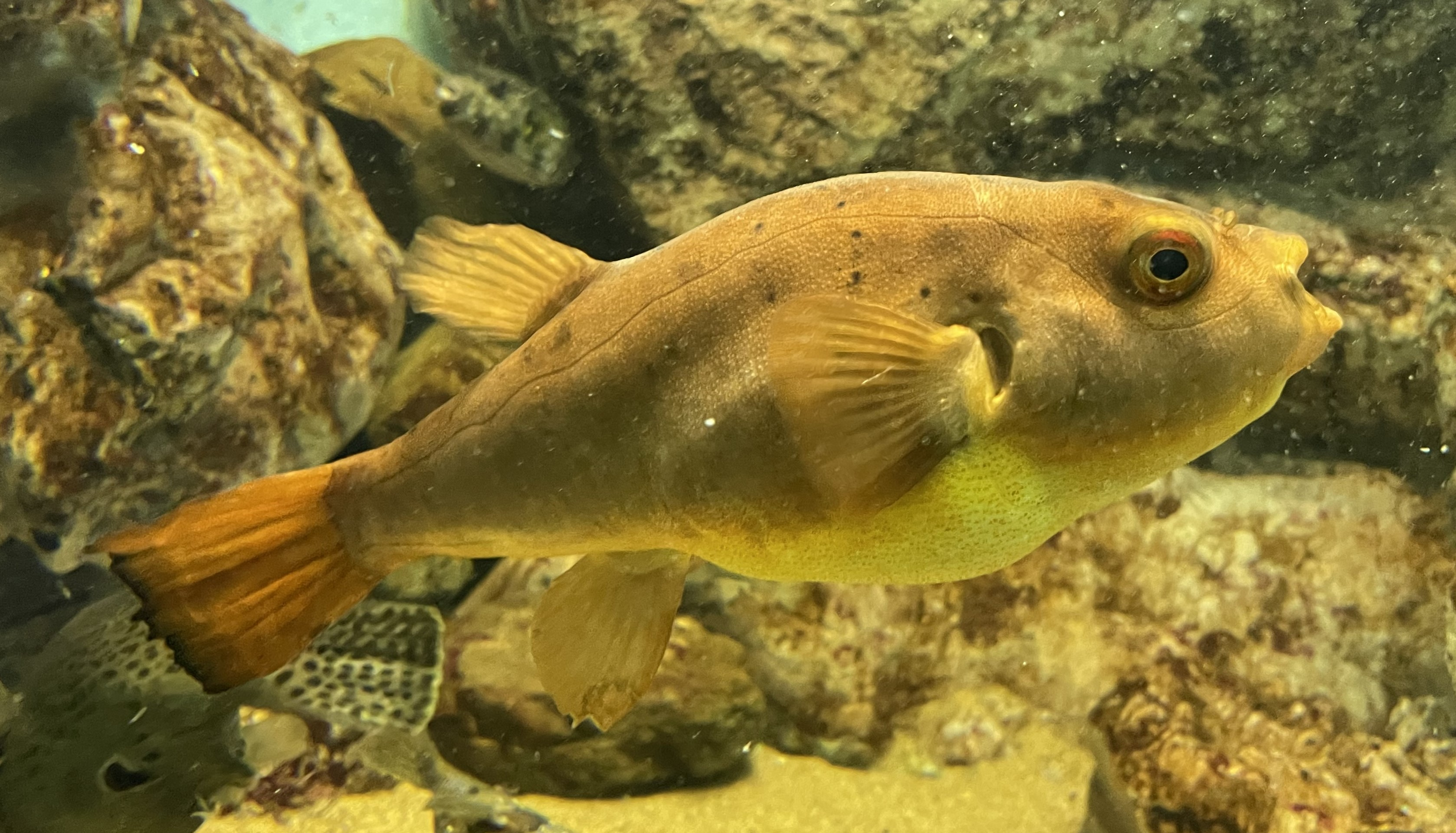

Scientific classification
- Kingdom: Animalia
- Phylum: Chordata
- Class: Actinopterygii
- Order: Tetraodontiformes
- Family: Tetraodontidae
- Genus: Takifugu
- Species: T. chrysops

Binomial name
- Takifugu chrysops (Hilgendorf, 1879)

Synonyms
- Fugu chrysops; Tetrodon chrysops

= Takifugu chrysops =

Species of fish

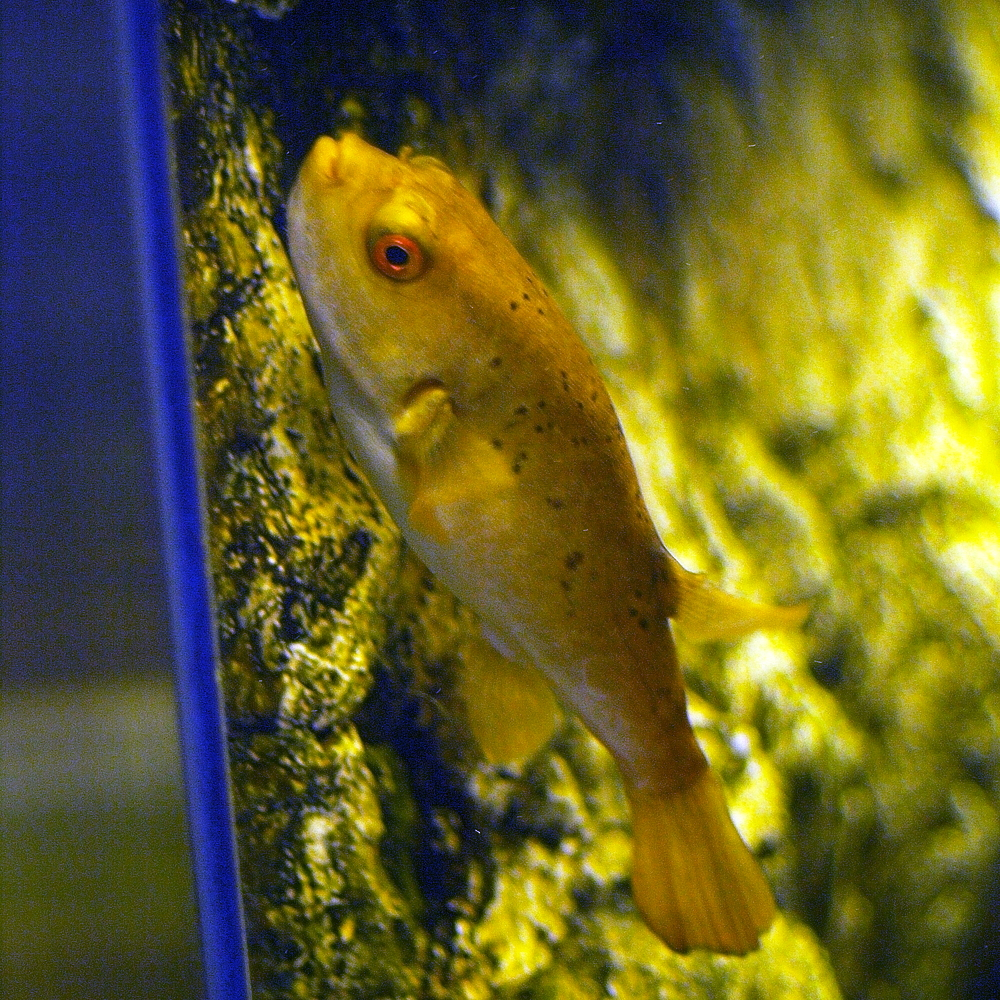
T. chrysops in an aquarium.

Takifugu chrysops is a species of pufferfish in the family Tetraodontidae. It is a marine species known from Japan, where it ranges from Tosa Bay to Tokyo Bay. It is a demersal fish that reaches 20 cm (7.9 inches) SL. Although sometimes known as the red-eyed puffer, this can lead to confusion with several freshwater species of the genus Carinotetraodon.
