= Takifugu stictonotus =

Scientific classification
- Kingdom: Animalia
- Phylum: Chordata
- Class: Actinopterygii
- Division: Teleostei
- Order: Tetraodontiformes
- Family: Tetraodontidae
- Genus: Takifugu
- Species: T. stictonotus

Binomial name
- Takifugu stictonotus (Temminck & Schlegel, 1850)

Synonyms
- Fugu stictonotus; Takifugu strictonotus; Tetraodon stictonotus

Species of pufferfish

Takifugu stictonotus is a species of pufferfish in the family Tetraodontidae. It is native to the Northwest Pacific, where it ranges from Hokkaido to the East China Sea and the Yellow Sea. It is a demersal species that reaches 35 cm (13.8 inches) SL. In Mandarin Chinese, the species is known as 密点多纪鲀, translating to "dense pufferfish".
