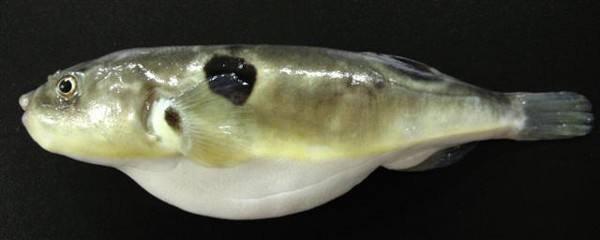
- Note: The depicted specimen appears to be missing its dorsal fin

Conservation status
- Least Concern (IUCN 3.1)

Scientific classification
- Kingdom: Animalia
- Phylum: Chordata
- Class: Actinopterygii
- Order: Tetraodontiformes
- Family: Tetraodontidae
- Genus: Takifugu
- Species: T. obscurus

Binomial name
- Takifugu obscurus (Abe, 1949)

Synonyms
- Fugu obscurus (Abe, 1949); Sphoeroides ocellatus Abe, 1949

= Takifugu obscurus =

Species of fish

Takifugu obscurus or the obscure pufferfish is a species of euryhaline, anadromous pufferfish first described by T. Abe in 1949. It has been categorized by the IUCN as a least-concern species globally since 2014; in South Korea, it is however classified as an endangered species due to overfishing of its endemic populations. The Catalogue of Life lists no subspecies of Takifugu obscurus. The species prefers deeper, clearer areas of brackish and fresh water, and is found in estuaries, as well as rivers and tributaries thereof such as the South Korean rivers Geum, Han, and Imjin, or the Tamsui River. The species is endemic to North and South Korea, the Sea of Japan, and the East and South China Seas. Uses of Takifugu obscurus include human consumption, use in animal testing, and owning specimens as pets. As with most species of pufferfish, several organs of Takifugu obscurus contain tetrodotoxin, making it potentially poisonous if not prepared safely by trained persons.

== Morphology ==
Takifugu obscurus is characterized by the following traits:

- Body, especially ventral region or "belly" covered in prickles
- Dark spots on either side, above and often somewhat behind the pectoral fins
- One larger dark spot surrounding the base of the dorsal fin
- A blunt snout and small mouth
- A maximum length of 40 cm
- 15–19 dorsal soft rays, 13–16 anal soft rays, no dorsal or anal spines
- While the fish is alive, a yellowish tint to the fins

== Bibliography ==
- Eschmeyer, William N.: Genera of Recent Fishes. California Academy of Sciences. San Francisco, California, United States. iii + 697. ISBN 0-940228-23-8 (1990).
- Eschmeyer, William N., ed. 1998. Catalog of Fishes. Special Publication of the Center for Biodiversity Research and Information, no. 1, vol. 1–3. California Academy of Sciences. San Francisco, California, United States. ISBN 0-940228-47-5.
- Helfman, G., B. Collette i D. Facey: The diversity of fishes. Blackwell Science, Malden, Massachusetts (USA), 1997.
- Kullander, S.O., 2003. Family Tetraodontidae (Pufferfishes). p. 670. A: R.E. Reis, S.O. Kullander i C.J. Ferraris, Jr. (eds.) Checklist of the Freshwater Fishes of South and Central America. Porto Alegre: EDIPUCRS, Brazil.
- Lévêque, C., 1992. Tetraodontidae. p. 868–870. A: C. Levêque, D. Paugy, i G.G. Teugels (eds.) Faune des poissons d'eaux douces et saumâtres d'Afrique de l'Ouest. Vol. 2. Coll. Faune Tropicale, no. 28. Musée Royal de l'Afrique Centrale, Tervuren, Belgium i O.R.S.T.O.M., París, France. (in French)
- Matsuura, K., 1990: The pufferfish genus Fugu (Abe, 1952), a junior subjective synonym of Takifugu (Abe, 1949). Bulletin of the National Science Museum Series A (Zoology) v. 16 (no. 1): 15–20.
- Matsuura, K., 2001. Tetraodontidae. Puffers. p. 3954–3957. A: K.E. Carpenter i V. Niem (eds.) FAO species identification guide for fishery purposes. The living marine resources of the Western Central Pacific. Vol. 6. Bony fishes part 4 (Labridae to Latimeriidae). FAO, Rome.
- Moyle, P. i J. Cech.: Fishes: An Introduction to Ichthyology, 4th edition, Upper Saddle River, New Jersey, United States: Prentice-Hall. 2000.
- Nelson, J.S. 2006: Fishes of the world. Fourth edition. John Wiley & Sons, Inc. Hoboken, New Jersey, United States. 601 p.
- Song, L.-S., B.-Z. Liu, Z.-Z. Wang, H.-L. Li i J.-H., 2001: Phylogenetic relationships among pufferfish of genus Takifugu by RAPD analysis. Chinese Journal of Oceanology and Limnology v. 19 (no. 2): 128–134.
- Wheeler, A.: The World Encyclopedia of Fishes, 2nd edition, London: Macdonald. 1985.
- Yamada, U., 2002. Tetraodontidae. p. 1418–1431. A: T. Nakabo (ed.). Fishes of Japan with pictorial keys to the species (second edition). Tokai University Press, 1749 p.
