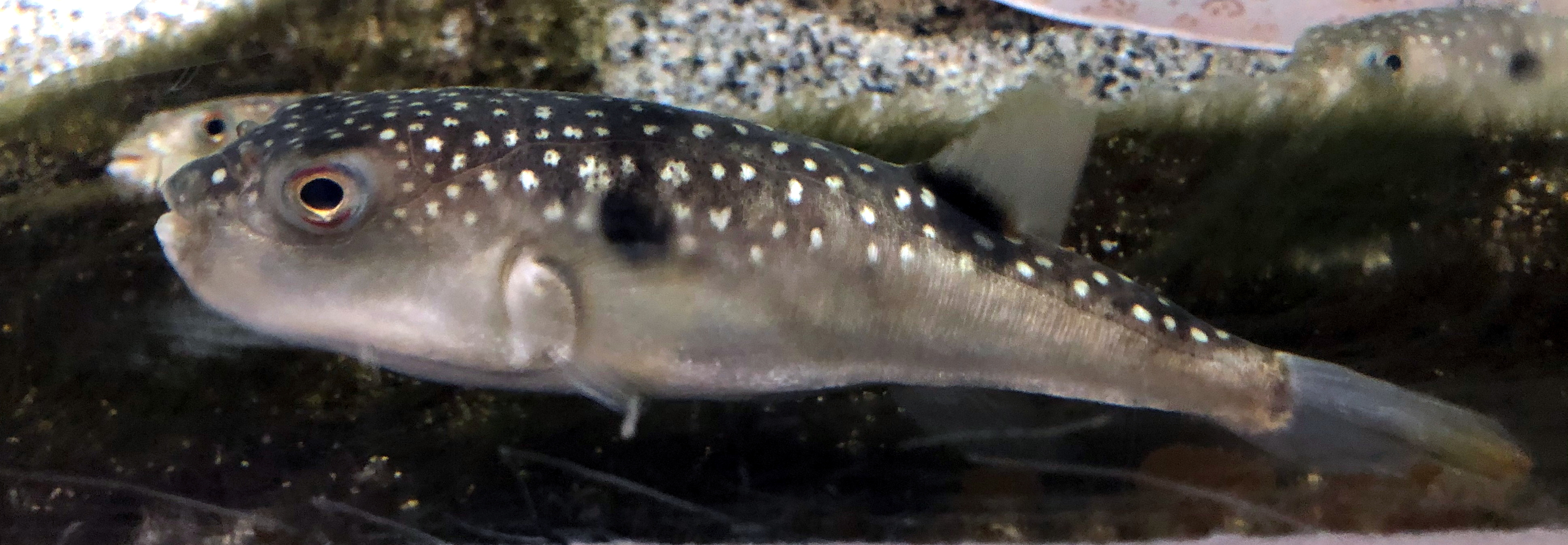

Conservation status
- Least Concern (IUCN 3.1)

Scientific classification
- Kingdom: Animalia
- Phylum: Chordata
- Class: Actinopterygii
- Division: Teleostei
- Order: Tetraodontiformes
- Family: Tetraodontidae
- Genus: Takifugu
- Species: T. alboplumbeus

Binomial name
- Takifugu alboplumbeus (Richardson, 1845)

Synonyms
- Fugu alboplumbeus; Tetrodon alboplumbeus

= Takifugu alboplumbeus =

Species of pufferfish

Takifugu alboplumbeus, sometimes known as the grey-spotted puffer, is a species of pufferfish in the family Tetraodontidae. It is a marine species native to the Indo-Pacific that reaches 23 cm (9.1 inches) SL. It is known to be highly toxic.

== Toxicity ==
The grey-spotted puffer uses a highly potent neurotoxin called Tetrodotoxin (abbreviated as TTX) for biological defense against predation. TTX is not produced by the pufferfish. Rather, it comes from the fish's diet. The grey-spotted puffer has been observed eating the flatworm Planocera multitentaculata and its eggs, both of which contain TTX. These flatworms are thought to be at least one source of the neurotoxin. TTX builds up in the skin and ovaries of females and the skin and liver of males. The neurotoxin is passed on to the eggs of the puffer.
