= Takifugu reticularis =

Conservation status
- Least Concern (IUCN 3.1)

Scientific classification
- Kingdom: Animalia
- Phylum: Chordata
- Class: Actinopterygii
- Order: Tetraodontiformes
- Family: Tetraodontidae
- Genus: Takifugu
- Species: T. reticularis

Binomial name
- Takifugu reticularis (Tian, Cheng & Wang, 1975)

Synonyms
- Fugu reticularis

Species of pufferfish

Takifugu reticularis is a species of pufferfish in the family Tetraodontidae. It is native to the Northwest Pacific, where it is known from the Yellow Sea and the East China Sea. It is a demersal species that reaches 29 cm (11 in) standard length. While the toxicity of the species is unknown, it is assumed to be at least somewhat poisonous. In Chinese, the species is known commonly as 網紋多紀魨, meaning "reticulated pufferfish".
