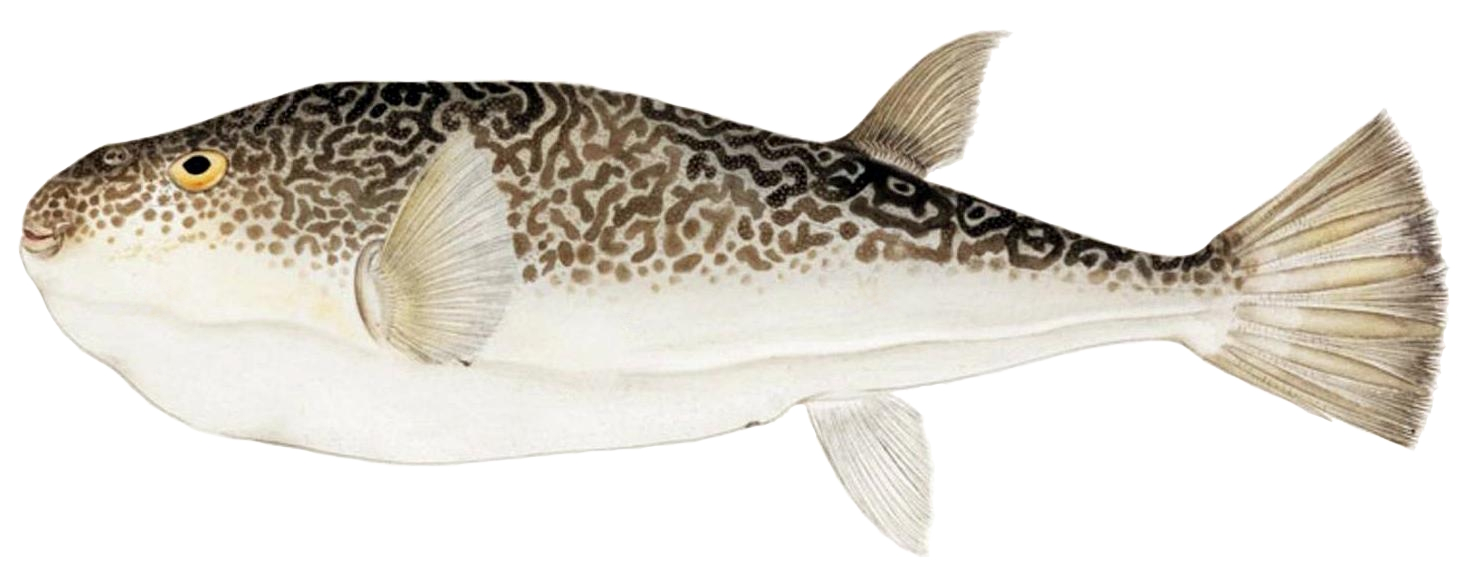
- painting

Conservation status
- Near Threatened (IUCN 3.1)

Scientific classification
- Kingdom: Animalia
- Phylum: Chordata
- Class: Actinopterygii
- Order: Tetraodontiformes
- Family: Tetraodontidae
- Genus: Takifugu
- Species: T. vermicularis

Binomial name
- Takifugu vermicularis (Temminck & Schlegel, 1850)

= Takifugu vermicularis =

Species of fish

Takifugu vermicularis, the purple puffer, is a species of pufferfish native to the northwest Pacific Ocean where it occurs in the waters around China, Taiwan, the Republic of Korea and Japan. This species is of commercial importance though the flesh is toxic. This species grows to a length of 30 centimetres (12 in) SL.
