= Takifugu coronoidus =

Scientific classification
- Domain: Eukaryota
- Kingdom: Animalia
- Phylum: Chordata
- Class: Actinopterygii
- Order: Tetraodontiformes
- Family: Tetraodontidae
- Genus: Takifugu
- Species: T. coronoidus

Binomial name
- Takifugu coronoidus Y. Ni & C. S. Li, 1992

Species of fish

Takifugu coronoidus is a species of pufferfish in the family Tetraodontidae. It is a brackish-water species known from China that was first described by Y. Li and C. S. Ni in 1992. In Chinese, the species is known as "晕环多纪鲀", which translates to "halo pufferfish".
