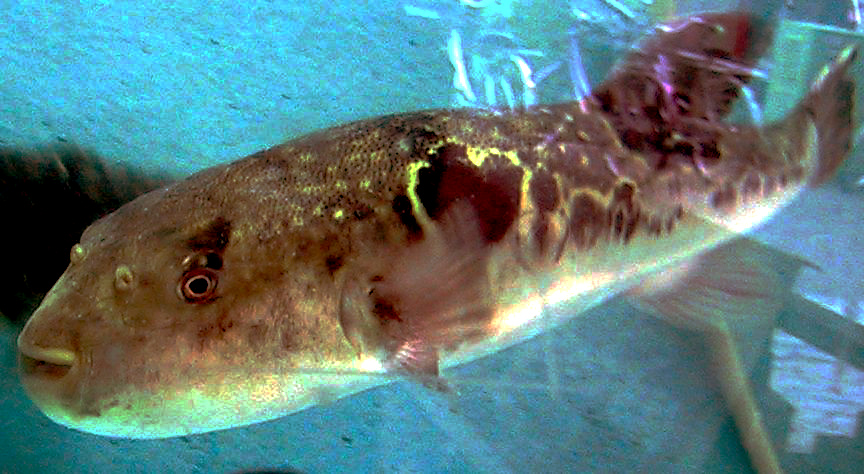

Scientific classification
- Kingdom: Animalia
- Phylum: Chordata
- Class: Actinopterygii
- Order: Tetraodontiformes
- Family: Tetraodontidae
- Subfamily: Tetraodontinae
- Genus: Takifugu; Abe, 1949

Type species
- Takifugu ocellatus Linnaeus, 1758

Species
- 25, See species table below

Synonyms
- Gastrophysus Müller, 1843; Fugu Abe, 1952

= Takifugu =

Genus of fishes

Takifugu, also known by the Japanese name fugu (河豚; lit. "river pig"), is a genus of pufferfish currently with 25 species. Most are native to salt and brackish waters of the northwest Pacific, but a few species are found in freshwater in Asia or more widely in the Indo-Pacific region. Their diet consists mostly of algae, molluscs, invertebrates and sometimes crustaceans.

These fish contain lethal amounts of tetrodotoxin in the internal organs, especially the liver and the ovaries, but also in the skin and the testes. The toxin paralyzes the muscles while the victim stays fully conscious, and eventually dies from asphyxiation. There is currently no antidote, and the standard medical approach is to try to support the respiratory and circulatory system until the effect of the toxin wears off.

== Distribution and conservation status ==
Currently, 25 species are placed in the genus Takifugu. Most species are restricted to salt and brackish waters of the northwest Pacific, but a few occur more widely in the Indo-Pacific region or in freshwater of Asia. Although several are euryhaline to some extent, most are unable to live in freshwater. Two exceptions are the Takifugu obscurus and Takifugu ocellatus, which live in coastal marine waters but migrate into fresh water to spawn in rivers.

Most species in the genus are not considered threatened, but there are two notable exceptions: the critically endangered Takifugu chinensis and the endangered Takifugu plagiocellatus.

== Morphology and behaviour ==
Not all Takifugu species have been studied in detail, but the most researched species, Takifugu rubripes, serves as a model organism in biological research; its availability is due to the commercial farming of this species for human consumption (in Japan and elsewhere). This species breeds from March to May and lays eggs attached to rocks at a depth of around 20 m (66 ft). Species that live exclusively in marine and brackish waters also breed in this habitat; in contrast, as mentioned above, the anadromous Takifugu obscurus migrates from its coastal marine habitat into fresh water to spawn.

An even more exceptional and unique breeding behavior is displayed by Takifugu niphobles. They gather in groups at certain beaches, throw themselves onto land where fertilization happens and then return to the water. The eggs either float back into the water or may stay on land under rocks for a period, only hatching when again submerged by high tide. This breeding behavior is unique among pufferfish, but found in a few other unrelated fish like capelin and grunion.

== Toxicity ==
The main defense of Takifugu against predators is the tetrodotoxin contained in its internal organs, mainly the ovaries and the liver. This neurotoxin is also present, albeit at a lower level, in the intestines and the skin, and minute amounts can be found in the muscles and the blood. This makes these fish a lethal meal for most predators, including the occasional human.

Tetrodotoxin, or more precisely anhydrotetrodotoxin 4-epitetrodotoxin, is about 1200 times deadlier than cyanide. It can also be found in other animals such as the blue-ringed octopus, cone snails, and even some newts. Takifugu does not synthesize the toxin itself; rather, it is synthesized by symbiotic bacteria (e.g. Pseudomonas), which the fish obtains by eating food containing the bacteria. Hence, Takifugu born and grown in captivity never produce tetrodotoxin until they are exposed to the toxin-producing bacteria, often by eating tissues from a toxin-producing fish. Toxicity varies from one fish to the next, but generally speaking, each fish has enough tetrodotoxin to kill around 30 adult humans.

== Genome ==
Apparently, due to some unknown selection pressure, intronic and extragenic sequences have been drastically reduced within the pufferfish family (to which Takifugu belongs). As a result, they have the smallest-known genomes amongst the vertebrate animals. Since these genomes are relatively compact, it is relatively fast and inexpensive to compile their complete sequences, as has been done for two species of the family, including Takifugu rubripes (which was the second vertebrate in history to have its genome mapped, only after humans).

== Species ==
As of 2012, there are 25 recognized species in the genus Takifugu:

Species of the genus Takifugu
| Image | Species | Author | Common name | Distribution | Max. size | Comments |
|---|---|---|---|---|---|---|
| | Takifugu alboplumbeus | Richardson, 1845 | Komon-damashi (Japan) | West Pacific | 23 cm (9.1 in) SL | Poisonous |
| | Takifugu bimaculatus | Richardson, 1845 | Futatsuboshi-fugu (Japan) | Northwest Pacific | 30 cm (12 in) SL | Poisonous |
| | Takifugu chinensis^{*} | Abe, 1949 | Eyespot puffer, Karasu (Japan) | Northwest Pacific | 55 cm (22 in) SL | Poisonous |
| | Takifugu chrysops^{*} | Hilgendorf, 1879 | Red-eyed puffer, Akame-fugu (Japan) | Northwest Pacific | 20 cm (7.9 in) SL | Poisonous |
| | Takifugu coronoidus | Ni & Li, 1992 | 晕环东方鲀 (mainland China) | Northwest Pacific | ? | Not poisonous? |
| | Takifugu exascurus | Jordan & Snyder, 1901 | Mushi-fugu (Japan) | Northwest Pacific | 15 cm (5.9 in) SL | Poisonous |
| | Takifugu flavidus | Li, Wang & Wang, 1975 | Yellowbelly pufferfish, towny puffer, Sansai-fugu (Japan), 橘黄东方鲀 (mainland China), Hwang-jom-pok (Korea) | Northwest Pacific | 35 cm (14 in) SL | Poisonous |
| | Takifugu niphobles^{*} | Jordan & Snyder, 1901 | Grass puffer, starry puffer, Kusafugu (Japan), Cá Nóc sao (Vietnam) | Northwest Pacific | 15 cm (5.9 in) TL | Poisonous |
| | Takifugu oblongus | Bloch, 1786 | Oblong blowfish, lattice blaasop (India), bebo (India), buntal (Malaysia), pita-pita (Indonesia), ruitjies-blaasop (South Africa) | West Pacific | 40 cm (16 in) TL | Poisonous |
| | Takifugu obscurus^{*} | Abe, 1949 | Obscure puffer, Mefugu (Japan) | Western Pacific | 40 centimetres (16 in) SL | Poisonous |
| | Takifugu ocellatus | Linnaeus, 1758 | Ocellated puffer, 弓班东方鲀 (mainland China) | Asia | 15 cm (5.9 in) TL | Poisonous |
| | Takifugu orbimaculatus | Kuang, Li & Liang, 1984 | 圆斑东方鲀 (mainland China) | Asia | ? | Not Poisonous? |
| | Takifugu pardalis^{*} | Temminck & Schlegel, 1850 | Panther puffer, Higan-fugu (Japan), 豹纹东方鲀 (mainland China), Chol-pok (Korea) | Northwest Pacific | 30 cm (12 in) SL | Poisonous |
| | Takifugu plagiocellatus | Li, 2002 | 斜斑东方鲀 (mainland China) | Northwest Pacific | 10.9 cm (4.3 in) SL | |
| | Takifugu poecilonotus^{*} | Temminck & Schlegel, 1850 | Fine-patterned puffer, Komon-fugu (Japan), 斑点东方鲀 (mainland China), Huin-jom-pok (Korea) | Northwest Pacific | 20 cm (7.9 in) SL | Poisonous |
| | Takifugu porphyreus^{*} | Temminck & Schlegel, 1850 | Purple puffer, Namera-fugu, Mafugu (Japan), 紫色东方鲀 (mainland China), Kom-pok (Korea) | Northwest Pacific | 52 cm (20 in) TL | Poisonous |
| | Takifugu pseudommus | Chu, 1935 | Namerada-fugu, Namerada-mashi (Japan) | Northwest Pacific | 35 cm (14 in) SL | Poisonous |
| | Takifugu radiatus | Abe, 1947 | Nashi-fugu (Japan) | Northwest Pacific | 20 cm (7.9 in) SL | Poisonous |
| | Takifugu reticularis | Tian, Cheng & Wang, 1975 | Reticulate puffer, Amime-fugu (Japan) | Northwest Pacific | 29 cm (11 in) SL | Poisonous |
| | Takifugu rubripes^{*} | Temminck & Schlegel, 1850 | Japanese puffer, tiger puffer, Tora-fugu (Japan), 红鳍东方鲀 (mainland China), Cha-ju-pok (Korea) | Northwest Pacific | 80 cm (31 in) TL | Poisonous, |
| | Takifugu snyderi^{*} | Abe, 1988 | Shosai-fugu (Japan) | Western Pacific | 30 cm (12 in) SL | Poisonous |
| | Takifugu stictonotus^{*} | Temminck & Schlegel, 1850 | Spotback, spottyback puffer, Goma-fugu (Japan) | Northwest Pacific | 35 cm (14 in) SL | Poisonous |
| | Takifugu variomaculatus | Li & Kuang, 2002 | 花斑东方鲀 (mainland China) | Northwest Pacific | 13.7 cm (5.4 in) SL | |
| | Takifugu vermicularis | Temminck & Schlegel, 1850 | Purple puffer, pear puffer, Shosai-fugu (Japan), Nashifugu (Japan), 虫纹东方鲀 (mainland China), Kuk-mae-ri-bok (Korea), | Northwest Pacific | 30 cm (12 in) SL | Poisonous |
| | Takifugu xanthopterus^{*} | Temminck & Schlegel, 1850 | Yellowfin puffer, Shima-fugu (Japan), 条纹东方鲀 (mainland China), Ka-ch'i-pok (Korea) | Northwest Pacific | 50 cm (20 in) SL | Poisonous |

^{*} Species with edible body parts (according to the Japanese Ministry of Health and Welfare)

== See also ==
- Fugu Plan
- Seafood
- Tokiharu Abe
