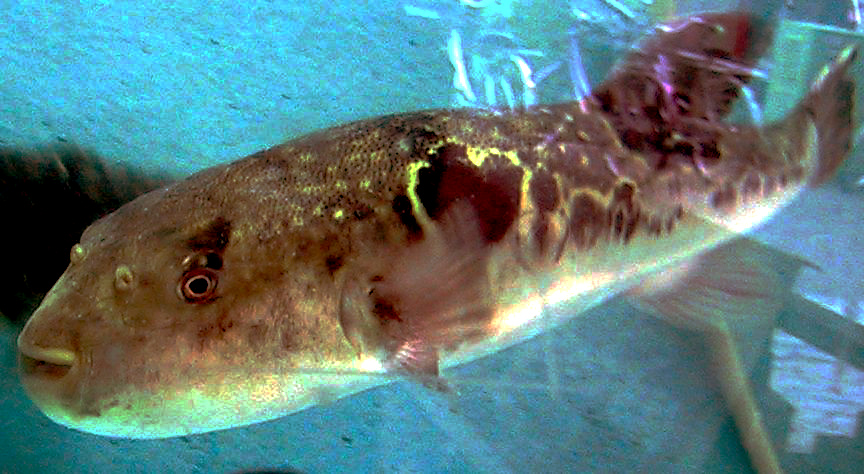

Conservation status
- Near Threatened (IUCN 3.1)

Scientific classification
- Kingdom: Animalia
- Phylum: Chordata
- Class: Actinopterygii
- Division: Teleostei
- Order: Tetraodontiformes
- Family: Tetraodontidae
- Genus: Takifugu
- Species: T. rubripes

Binomial name
- Takifugu rubripes (Temminck & Schlegel, 1850)

Synonyms
- Fugu rubripes (Temminck & Schlegel, 1850); Fugu rubripes ssp. rubripes (Temminck & Schlegel, 1850); Sphaeroides rubripes (Temminck & Schlegel, 1850); Tetraodon rubripes Temminck & Schlegel, 1850)

= Takifugu rubripes =

Species of fish

Global aquaculture production of Takifugu rubripes in thousand tonnes from 1980 to 2022, as reported by the FAO

Takifugu rubripes, commonly known as the Japanese puffer, Japanese pufferfish, tiger puffer, or torafugu (Japanese: 虎河豚), is a pufferfish in the genus Takifugu. It is distinguished by a very small genome that has been fully sequenced because of its use as a model species and is in widespread use as a reference in genomics.

== Taxonomy and etymology ==
The species is often referred to in the genomics literature as Fugu rubripes. The genus Fugu is a synonym of the currently preferred Takifugu. Takifugu is Japanese for puffer and rubripes comes from the Latin ruber and pēs meaning ruddy foot.

== Distribution and habitat ==
The species is known from the Sea of Japan, East China Sea and Yellow Sea north to southern Sakhalin, at depths of 10–135 m (33–443 ft). It is a demersal species. Spawning occurs in estuaries; young fish can tolerate a wide range of salinities and will remain in river mouths and lagoons, maturing for one year before migrating permanently to the open ocean.

== Genome ==
A feature of this species is that it has a very small genome, which is used as a 'reference' for identifying genes and other elements in human and other vertebrate genomes. The genome was published in 2002 by the International Fugu Genome Consortium via whole genome shotgun sequencing. After being initiated in 1989, it was the first vertebrate genome after the human genome to be made publicly available. It remains among the smallest known vertebrate genomes; its number of base pairs is ~6% and the number of previously known protein-coding genes ~13% that of the human genome, although the number of chromosomes (22) is comparable to that of humans (23). This makes it particularly useful for comparative studies. Current estimates show a total of 392,376,244 base pairs, 1,138 known and 18,093 novel protein-coding genes, and 593 RNA genes.

One type of torafugu, 22-seiki fugu (meaning "22nd-century fugu"), has been genetically modified by removing four leptin receptor genes that control appetite. The result has increased appetite and weight gain, growing on average 1.9 times faster than normal torafugu. It is sold commercially as food.

== Toxicity ==
As some other pufferfish, some organs of the Japanese puffer contain tetrodotoxin and are highly toxic. The toxin is highly concentrated in liver and ovaries, slightly present in the intestines and flesh, and absent from skin and testes.

== Conservation ==
The Japanese puffer is classified as a Near Threatened by the IUCN. It is one of the most valuable commercial fishes in Japan, and although current catches (101 tonnes / year in 2004, down from a peak of 2,000 tonnes in 1987) are small compared to those of many other commercial species such as sardines and anchovy, they appear to be unsustainable and prevent the recovery of the species from earlier over-exploitation. Gear restrictions (most catches occur by longline fishing) and adjustments of fishery seasons to protect juveniles have been recommended to aid recovery. The species is extensively raised in aquaculture.
