= Fugu =

Various species of pufferfish

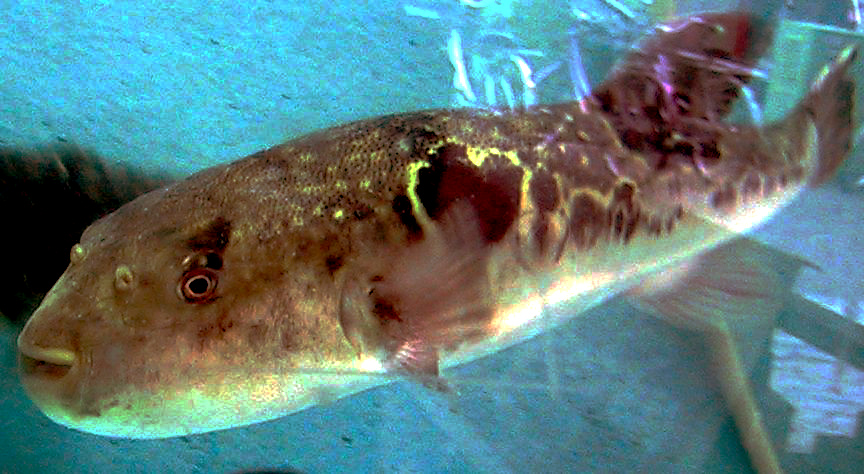
Takifugu in a tank

Fugu (河豚; 鰒; フグ, pronounced [ɸɯ̟ꜜɡɯ̟]) in Japanese, bogeo (복어; 鰒魚, pronounced [po̞ɡʌ̹]) or bok (복, pronounced [po̞k̚]) in Korean, and hétún (河豚; 河魨, pronounced [xɤ˧˥ tʰu̯ən˧˥]) in Standard Modern Chinese (Note: In Classical Chinese and the various regional varieties of Chinese, there are nearly a dozen synonyms that refer to the toxic pufferfish, including 䲅, 𩷪鱼, 黄驹, 魺, 嗔鱼, 鲑, 鲐鱼, 鮧, 鯸鲐, 鯸鮧, 鰗鮧, 鹕夷, 芽依, 鯸䱌, and 䰽.) refers to pufferfish, normally of the genus Takifugu, Lagocephalus, or Sphoeroides, or a porcupinefish of the genus Diodon, or a dish prepared from these fish.

Fugu possesses a potentially lethal poison known as tetrodotoxin, therefore necessitating meticulous preparation to prevent the fish from being contaminated. Restaurant preparation of fugu is strictly controlled by law in Japan, Korea and several other countries, and only chefs who have qualified after three or more years of rigorous training are allowed to prepare the fish. Domestic preparation occasionally leads to accidental death.

Throughout Japan, fugu is served as sashimi and nabemono. The liver, widely thought to be the most flavorful part, was traditionally served as a dish named fugu-kimo, but it is also the most poisonous, and serving this organ in restaurants was banned in Japan in 1984.

In East Asian cuisine, fugu has emerged as a delicacy, establishing itself as one of the most celebrated dishes in Japanese and Korean cuisine. Fugu has also been gradually emerging as a prized seafood delicacy in Chinese cuisine.

== Diversity ==
There are close to 200 species in the family Tetraodontidae (pufferfish), a family of primarily marine and estuarine fish of the order Tetraodontiformes. Nonetheless, only some of them are eaten and traded as "fugu".

== Toxicity ==
Fugu contains lethal amounts of the poison tetrodotoxin in its organs, especially the liver, ovaries, eyes, and skin. The poison, a sodium channel blocker, paralyzes the muscles while the victim stays fully conscious; the poisoned victim is unable to breathe and eventually dies from asphyxiation. There is no known antidote for fugu poison. The standard treatment is to support the respiratory and circulatory systems until the poison is metabolized and excreted by the victim's body.

Researchers have determined that a fugu's tetrodotoxin comes from eating other animals infested with tetrodotoxin-laden bacteria, to which the fish develops insensitivity over time. Whether tetrodotoxin is sequestered from or produced by symbiotic bacteria is still debated. As such, efforts have been made in research and aquaculture to allow farmers to produce safe fugu. Farmers now produce poison-free fugu by keeping the fish away from the bacteria – see § Aquaculture below.

=== Tetrodotoxin ===
Tetrodotoxin (TTX) is a natural product that has been isolated not only from pufferfish, but also octopuses, crabs, shellfish, frogs, newts, and other aquatic animals (see below). It is a potent neurotoxin that shuts down electrical signaling in nerves; it acts via interaction with components of the sodium channels in the cell membranes of those cells. Its ability to cross the blood–brain barrier is uncertain. In the case of the pufferfish host, at least (see below), their insusceptibility to the poison is thought to result from cysteine asperagine amino acid substitutions in the sequence of their specific types of sodium channel proteins.

TTX is not produced by pufferfish and the other aquatic animals from which it has been isolated. Rather, bacteria such as Alteromonas, Shewanella, and Vibrio species infect or cohabit with the animal species from which TTX is isolated, and a bacterial biosynthetic pathway for its production has been rationalized.

In animal studies with mice, the median lethal dose of TTX was found to be 232 μg per kg body weight. Tetrodotoxin levels are affected by preparation (removal of most toxic materials, treatments such as curing and pickling, see below); it is, however, reportedly not significantly affected by cooking.

Despite its toxicity, TTX has clinical therapeutic applications, being evaluated in phase II and III clinical trials to be effective for treating cancer-related pain without increasing serious adverse events.

== Consumption ==
=== History ===
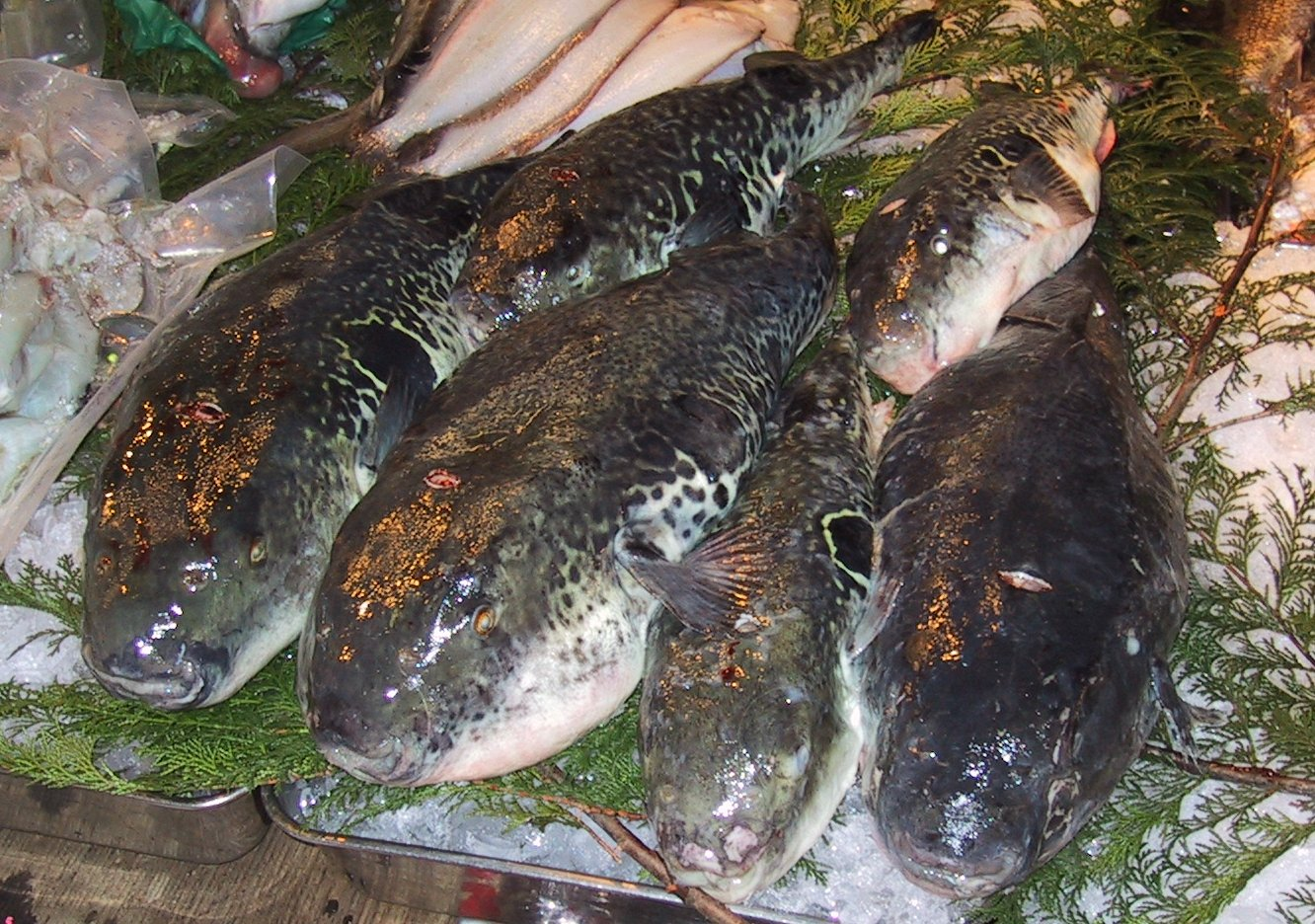
Torafugu for sale to master fugu chefs at the Tsukiji fish market in Tokyo

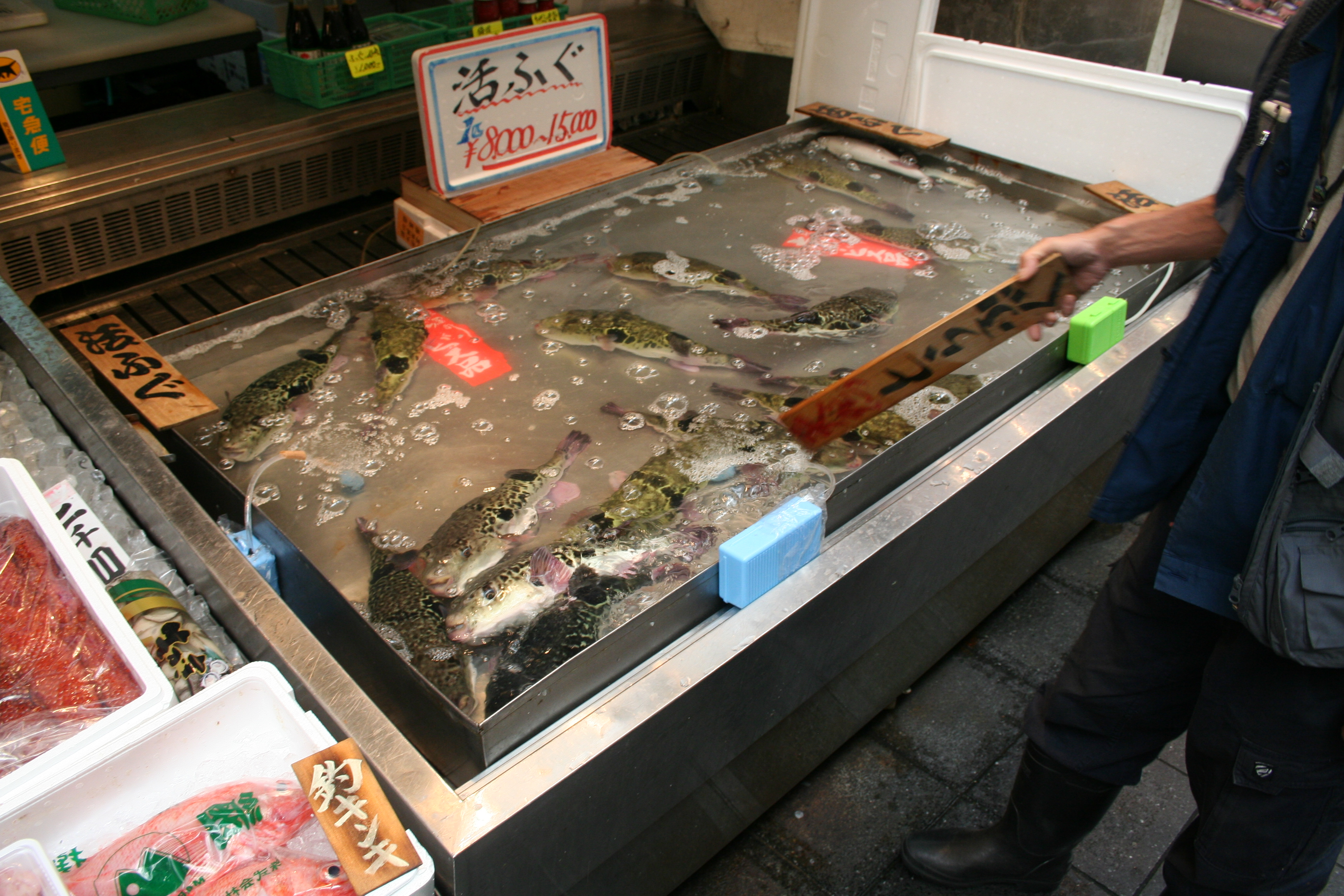
Fugu sale in a market street in Osaka, Japan

The inhabitants of Japan have eaten fugu for centuries. Fugu bones have been found in several shell middens, called kaizuka, from the Jōmon period that date back more than 2,300 years. The Tokugawa shogunate (1603–1868) prohibited the consumption of fugu in Edo and its area of influence. It became common again as the power of the Shōgunate weakened. In western regions of Japan, where the government's influence was weaker and fugu was easier to obtain, various cooking methods were developed to safely eat them. During the Meiji Era (1867–1912), fugu was again banned in many areas. According to one fugu chef in Tokyo, the Emperor of Japan has never eaten fugu due to an unspecified "centuries old ban".

In China, the use of the pufferfish for culinary purposes was already well-established by the Song dynasty as one of the "three delicacies of the Yangtze" (Chinese: 長江三鮮), alongside saury and Reeve's shad, and appears in the writings of the polymath Shen Kuo as well as in the encyclopedic work Taiping Guangji. The scholar-statesman Su Shi famously remarked that the taste is worthy of death (值那一死).

In 1774, James Cook during his second voyage, together with Johann Reinhold Forster and Georg Forster, ate some liver of a fish bartered from a native of an island in New Caledonia, likely a pufferfish. All three suffered symptoms of poisoning but survived.

=== Species ===
The torafugu, or tiger pufferfish (Takifugu rubripes), is the most prestigious edible species and the most poisonous. Other species are also eaten; for example, Higanfugu (T. pardalis), Shōsaifugu (T. vermicularis syn. snyderi), and Mafugu (T. porphyreus). The Ministry of Health, Labour and Welfare of Japan provides a list that shows which species' body parts can be consumed. The list names safe genera including pufferfish of the Lagocephalus and Sphoeroides genera and the related porcupinefish (Harisenbon) of the family Diodontidae.

=== Regulations ===
==== Japan ====
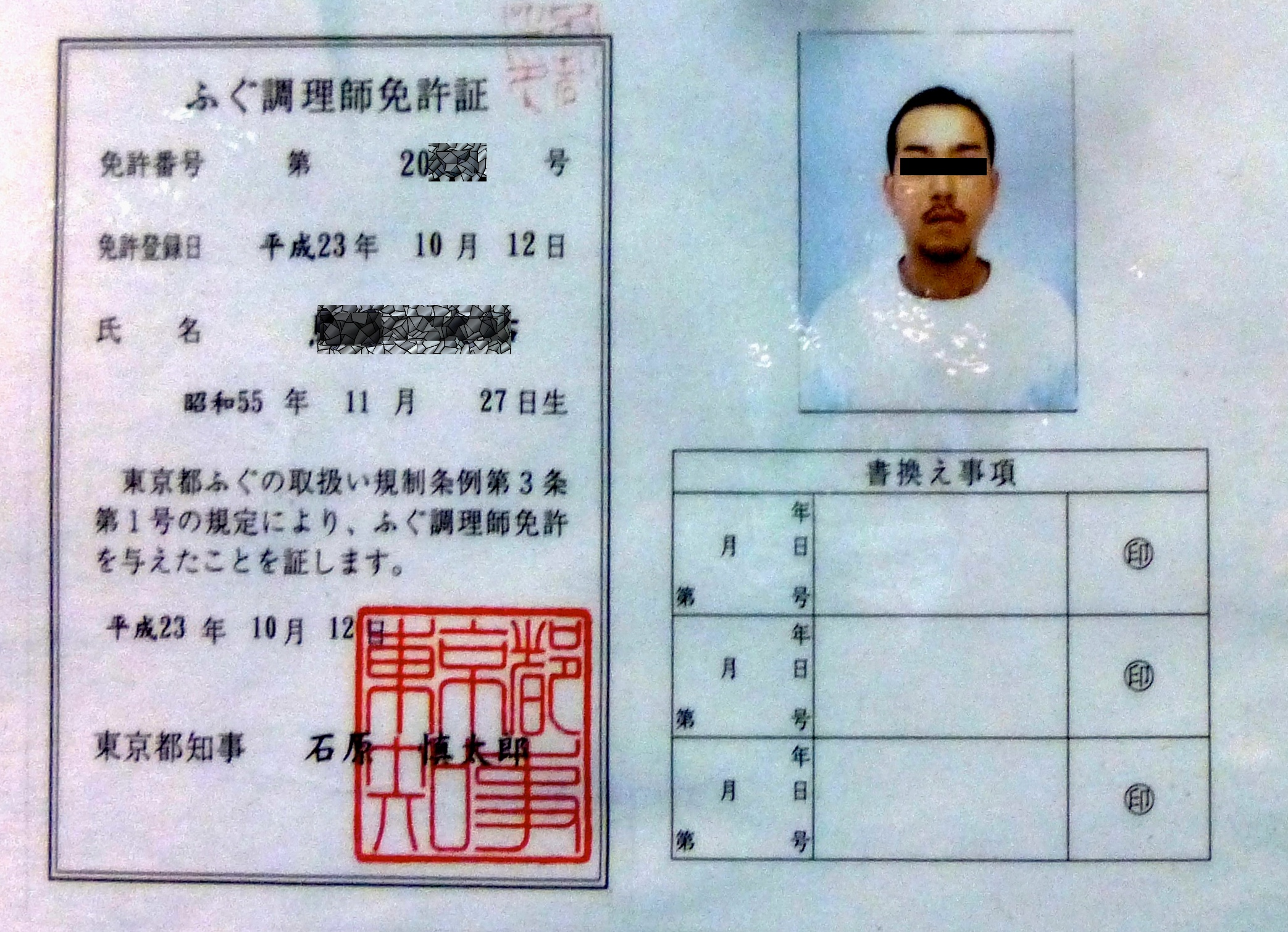
Official fugu preparation license of Tokyo issued by the Governor of Tokyo

Strict fishing regulations are now in place to protect fugu populations from depletion. Most fugu is now harvested in the spring during the spawning season and then farmed in floating cages in the Pacific Ocean. The largest wholesale fugu market in Japan is in Shimonoseki.

Fugu prices rise in autumn and peak in winter, the best season, because they fatten to survive the cold. Live fish arrive at a restaurant, surviving in a large tank, usually prominently displayed. Prepared fugu is also often available in grocery stores, which must display official license documents. Whole fish may not be sold to the general public.

Since 1958, fugu chefs must earn a license to prepare and sell fugu to the public. This involves a two- or three-year apprenticeship. The licensing examination process consists of a written test, a fish-identification test, practical test, and to prepare the fish. Only about 35 percent of the applicants pass. Small miscalculations result in failure or, in rare cases, death. Consumers believe that this training process makes it safer to eat fugu in restaurants or markets. Non-poisonous fugu can be produced by keeping the fish away from the bacteria that makes them poisonous.

Since October 2012, restaurants in Japan have been permitted to sell fugu that has been prepared and packaged by a licensed practitioner elsewhere.

The Saga Prefecture in Japan has petitioned the Food Safety Commission of Japan three times to reconsider its ban on fugu liver, stating that its farmed fugu is non-toxic. The FSCJ has rejected the proposals thrice due to "data insufficient to prove safety". NYT reported in 2008 that there is a well-known underground fugu-kimo scene in another Japanese town, Usuki, Ōita.

==== Korea ====
Fugu bones have been found in Gimhae and at other archeological sites in coastal villages. During the Goryeo and Joseon dynasties, fugu was widely consumed. The penal law specified prison for the cooks of fugu if a customer died, although standardised qualifications for fugu cooking did not exist.

After 1948, the Government of Korea restricted the cooking of fugu, and qualifications for who can cook fugu were established. Fugu chefs must be qualified if they are hired by a restaurant or open their own.

The qualification exam contains both a written and a practical test. The written portion covers the Fugu's poison, hygiene, basic food safety, and conceptions of Korean cuisine. The practical test allows chefs fifty-six minutes to remove the poisonous parts of fugu and prepare raw fish, bulgogi, and soup. The qualifying score is 60 out of 100.

==== China ====
China began issuing trial permits for serving fugu to restaurants in 2003. In 2016, the Chinese government abolished the permit system and allowed all restaurants to buy and serve farmed fish (without organs), now widely available. By 2019, such restaurants have become commonplace. China also allowed ordinary households to buy processed (organ-removed) whole fish online starting in 2017.

=== Cost ===
In the case of torafugu, the most common fugu, the cost is between JP¥1000–JP¥4000 (US$7–29) per kilogram, depending on the season and quality, as of 2022. The expense encourages chefs to slice the fish very carefully to obtain the largest possible amount of meat. A special knife, called fugu hiki, is usually stored separately from other knives.

In China, packaged farmed fugu cost CN¥330 (US$50) per kilogram as of February 2023.

=== Treatment ===
The symptoms of tetrodotoxin poisoning include dizziness, exhaustion, headache, nausea, and difficulty of breathing. The person remains conscious but cannot speak or move. In high doses, breathing stops and asphyxiation follows.

There is no known antidote, and treatment consists of emptying the stomach, administering activated charcoal to bind the toxin, and putting the person on life support until the poison has worn off. Toxicologists have been working for years on developing an antidote for tetrodotoxin.

=== Incidents ===
Between 1996 and 2006, statistics from the Tokyo Bureau of Social Welfare and Public Health indicate 20–44 annual incidents of fugu poisoning in Japan, some affecting multiple diners. Annually, 34–64 people were hospitalized and 0–6 died, with an average fatality rate of 6.8% of those hospitalized. Of the 23 incidents reported in Tokyo from 1993 through 2006, only one took place in a restaurant; all others involved people catching and eating the fish. Poisonings through amateur preparation can result from confusion between types of puffer, as well as improper methods. Some may also represent deliberate suicide attempts; Engelbert Kaempfer, a German physician who resided in Japan in the 1690s, reported that an unusually toxic variety of puffer was sometimes sought out by individuals who wished to take their own lives.

Much higher figures were reported in earlier years, peaking in 1958 when 176 people died from eating fugu in a single year. According to the Fugu Research Institute, 50% of the victims were poisoned by eating the liver, 43% from eating the ovaries, and 7% from eating the skin. One of the most famous victims was the Kabuki actor and "Living National Treasure" Bandō Mitsugorō VIII, who in 1975 died after eating four servings of fugu kimo (fugu liver), the sale of which was prohibited by local ordinances at the time. Bandō claimed to be able to resist the poison, but died several hours after returning to his hotel.

On August 23 2007, a doctor in Thailand reported that unscrupulous fish sellers sold puffer meat disguised as salmon, which caused fifteen deaths over three years. About 115 people were taken to different hospitals. Fugu had been banned in Thailand five years prior to the deaths.

In March 2008, a fisherman in the Philippines died and members of his family became ill from pufferfish. The previous year, four people in the same town died and five others had fallen ill after eating the same variety of pufferfish.

In February 2009, a Malaysian fisherman died and four others were hospitalized after they consumed a meal of pufferfish when they ran out of food while at sea.

In November 2011, a chef of two-Michelin star "Fugu Fukuji" in Tokyo was suspended from his post. The chef served fugu liver to a customer who, despite being warned of the risks, specifically asked that it be provided. The 35-year-old customer subsequently required hospital treatment for mild symptoms of tetrodotoxin paralysis, but made a full recovery.

Five men were poisoned at a restaurant in Wakayama in March 2015 after specifically asking for liver.

In December 2020, 3 people in the Philippines died, while 4 more were hospitalized after eating pufferfish.

In March 2023, an elderly woman and her husband in Malaysia died after consuming pufferfish purchased from a fishmonger.

In January 2024, a Brazilian man, 46, died after eating pufferfish given to him by a friend.

== Preparations ==
=== China ===
Although not as frequently consumed as in Japan and Korea, fugu is still considered a delicacy and served across restaurants in Beijing. Within the Chinese culinary sphere, fugu is generally prepared as a soup or braised whole. The fish may also be prepared using traditional Japanese culinary techniques.

(video) Fugu in a tank in front of a restaurant in Tokyo

=== Japan ===
- Sashimi — The most popular dish is fugu sashimi, also called Fugu sashi or tessa. Knives with exceptionally thin blades are used for cutting fugu into translucent slices, a technique known as Usuzukuri (薄造, うすづくり).
- Milt — The milt (Shirako) of the blowfish is a highly prized food item in Japan, and it is often found in department stores. Along with cod milt, it is one of the most popular kinds of milt, and it is often grilled and served with salt.
- Fried — Fugu can be eaten deep fried as Fugu Kara-age.
- Smoked — Fugu-fin sake. Sake infused with the smoked fin of the blowfish (fugu) to give a distinctive smoky, fishy flavour known as Hire-zake.
- Stew — Vegetables and fugu can be simmered as Fugu-chiri, also called tetchiri, in which case the fish's very light taste is hard to distinguish from the vegetables and the broth.
- Salad — If the spikes in the skin are pulled out, the skin can be eaten as part of a salad called yubiki.

In the cuisine of Hakusan, Ishikawa, ovaries are served after reducing the toxin level by salting and pickling for three years, in a dish named "blowfish ovaries pickled in rice-bran paste" (河豚の卵巣の糠漬け, ふぐのらんそうのぬかづけ). The dish is only made in specific regions of Ishikawa Prefecture (Mikawa district, Ono district, Kanaiwa district, and Wajima), and only the traditional method is permitted. Non-professionals are warned against attempting the process. After one year of pickling, about 10% of the toxin is suggested to remain, and after the full three years the product is "only sold after having been checked for safety through a toxicity inspection, and other tests."

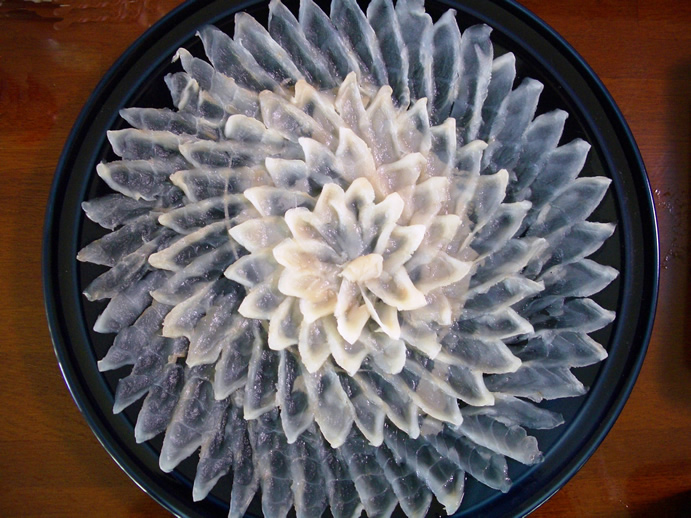
Plate of fugu sashimi

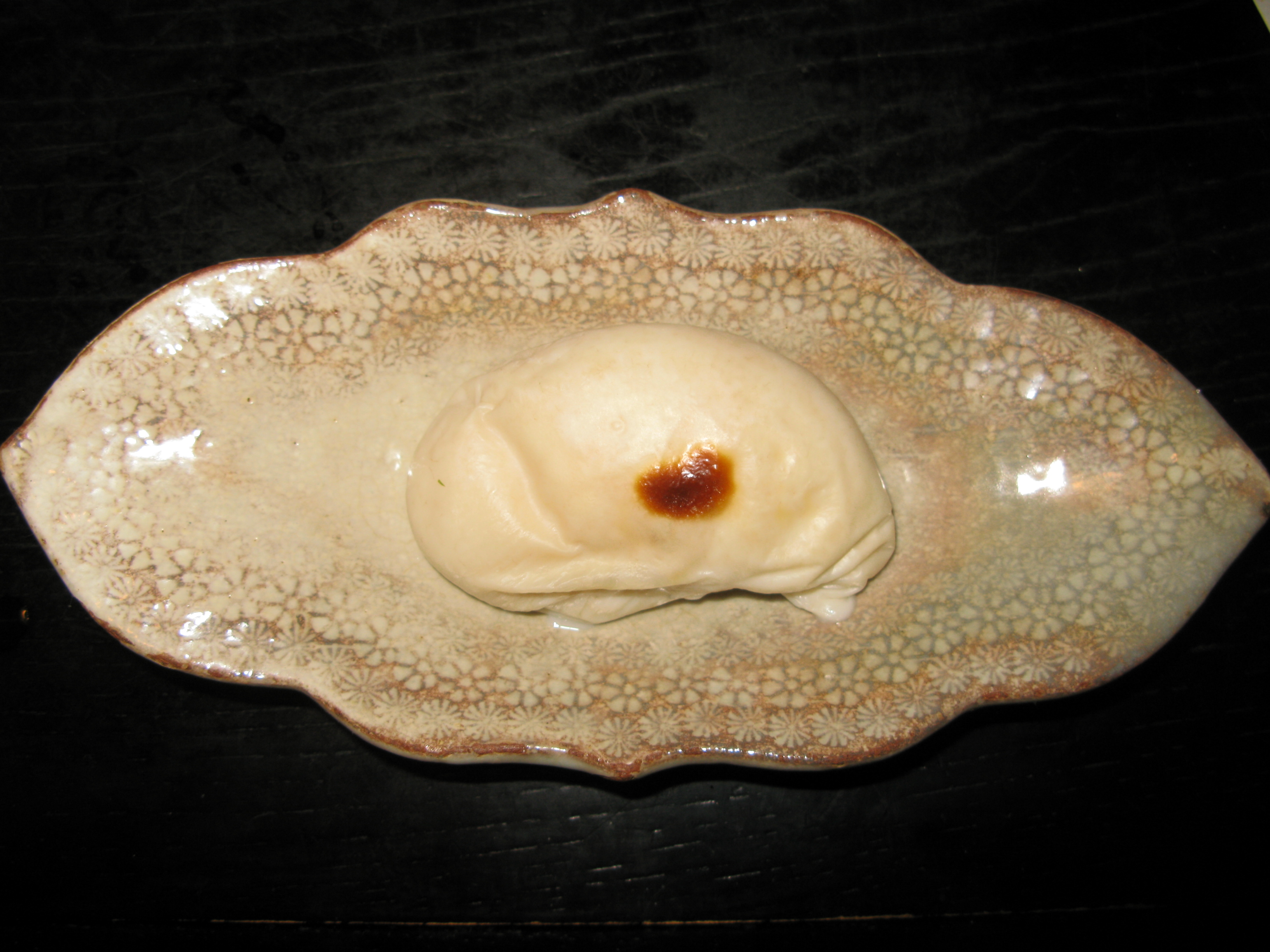
Fugu no Shirako

Fugu-nabe, pufferfish hotpot

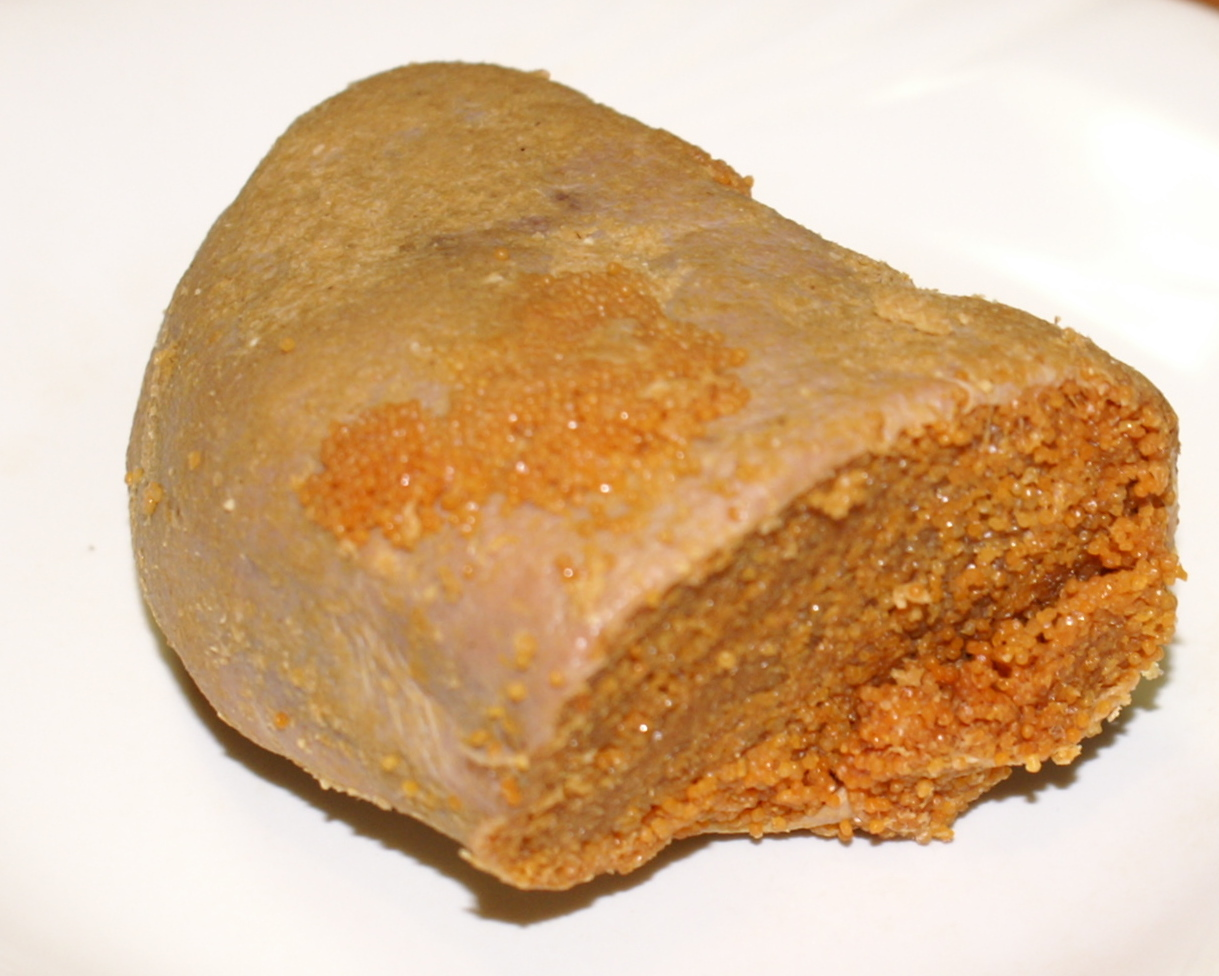
Fugu no ransou nukazuke, blowfish ovaries pickled in rice-bran paste

=== Korea ===
In Korean cuisine, edible pufferfish are prepared in various ways including gui (grilling), jorim (simmering), jjim, Bulgogi, Hoe (raw fish) and guk (soup).

In some villages in North Jeolla Province, Fugu eggs are preserved as Jeotgal with the supervision by Government of Jeollabuk-do Province. Milt of Fugu is served at restaurant with raw, semi-roasted salad, full roasted, deep fried and stewed. Smoked Fugu fin is dried and dunk in Traditional Soju or Cheongju.

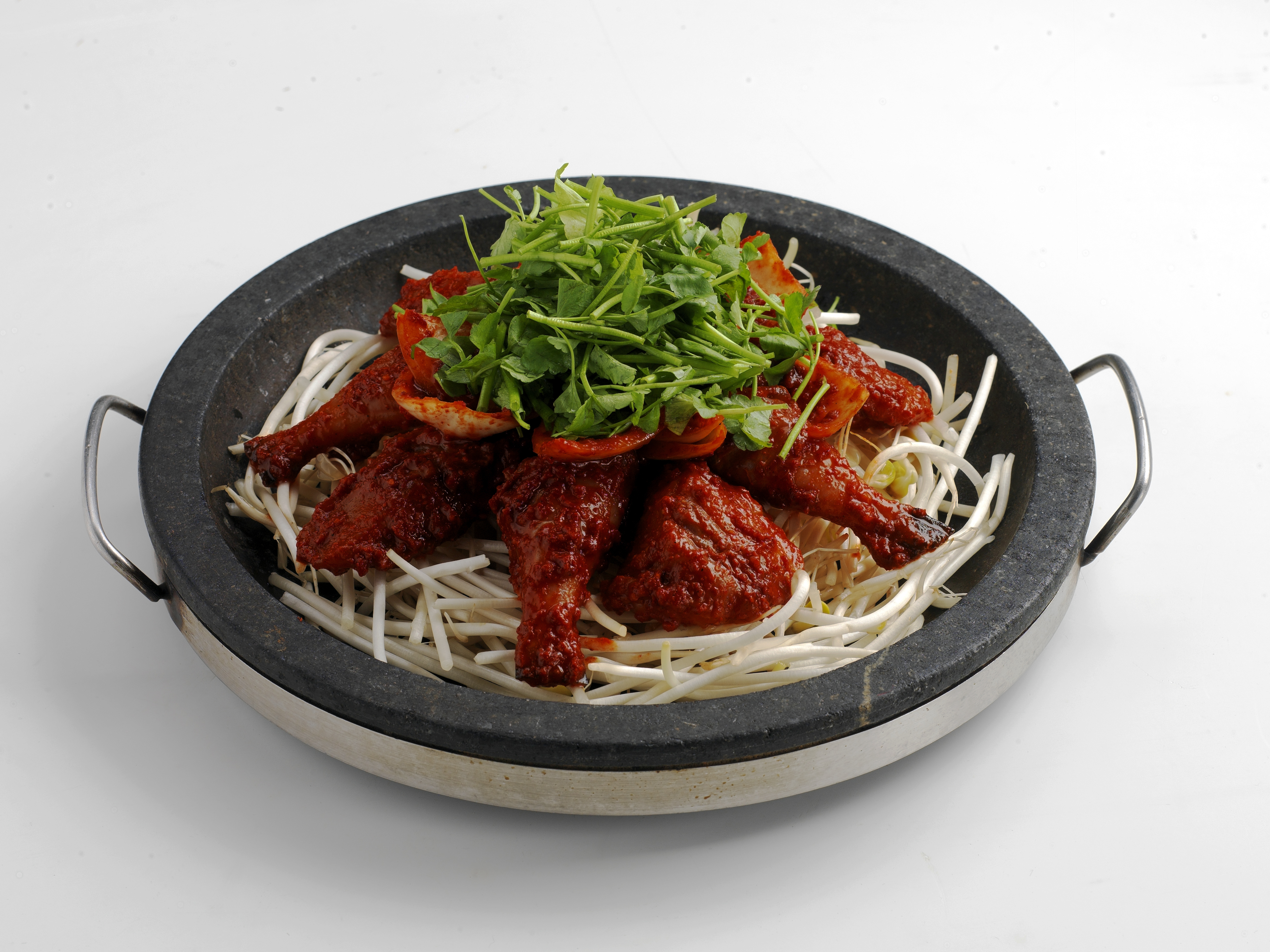
Bogeo-bulgogi

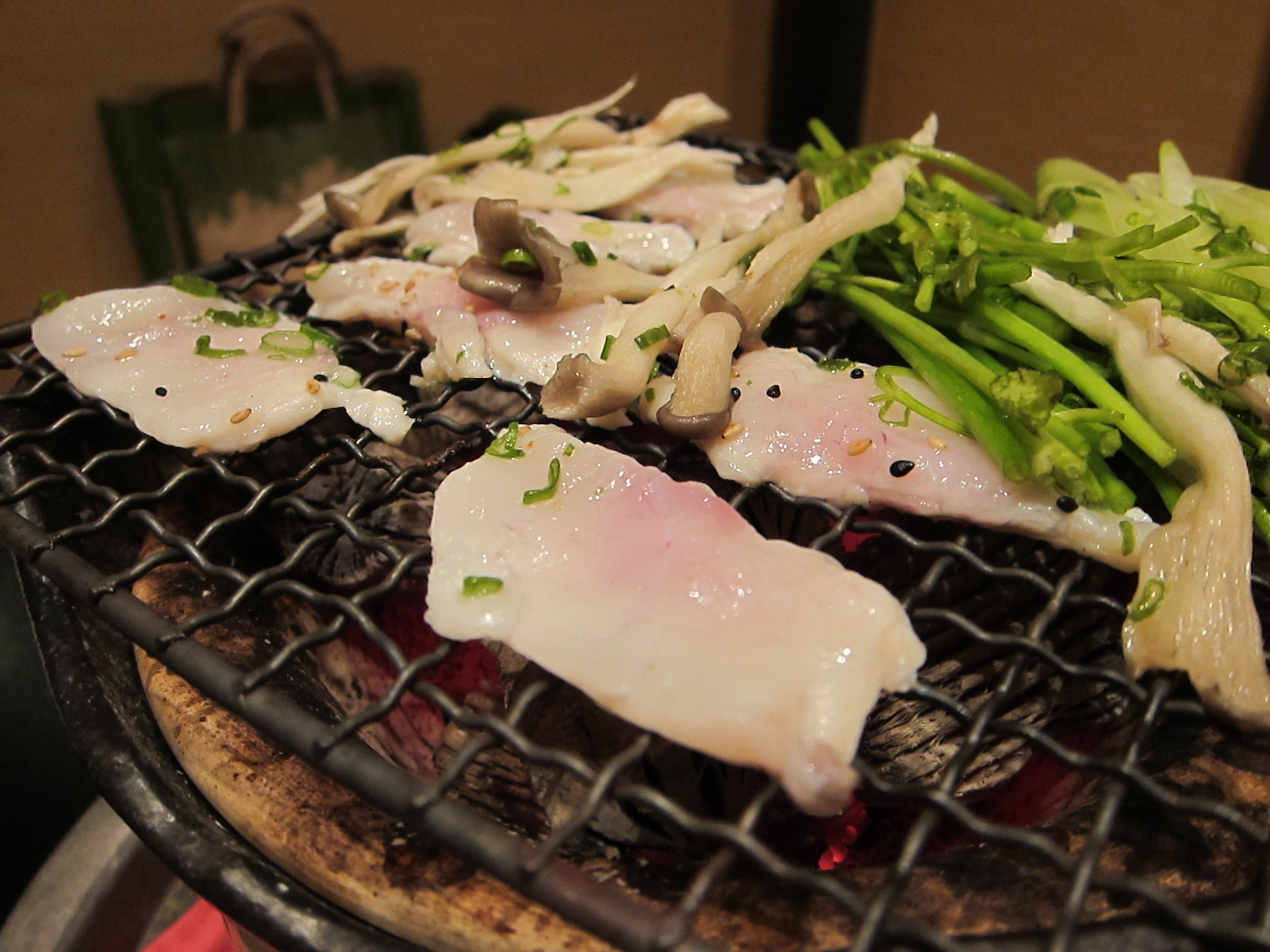
Bogeo-gui (grilled pufferfish)

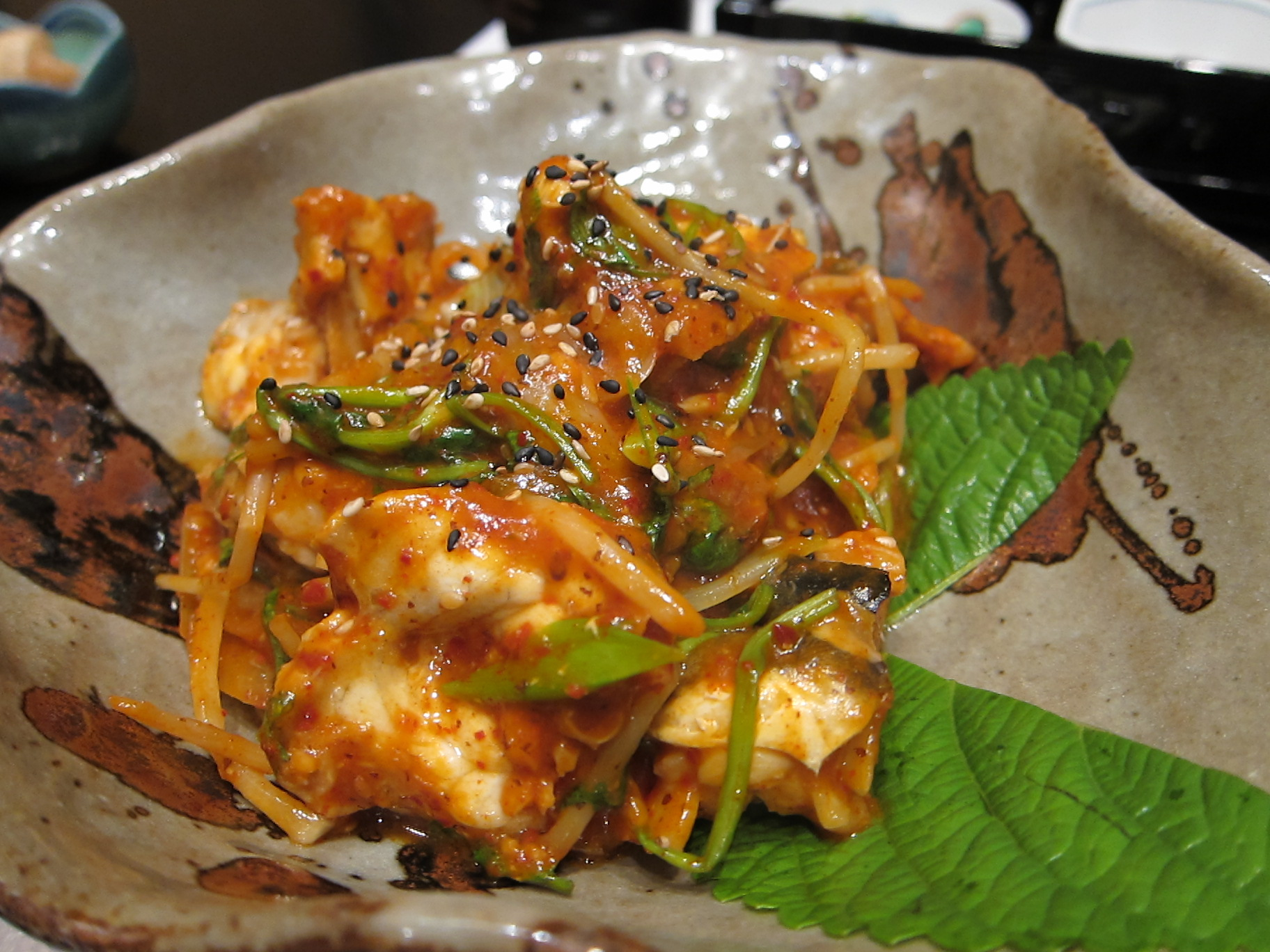
Bogeo-jorim (simmered pufferfish)

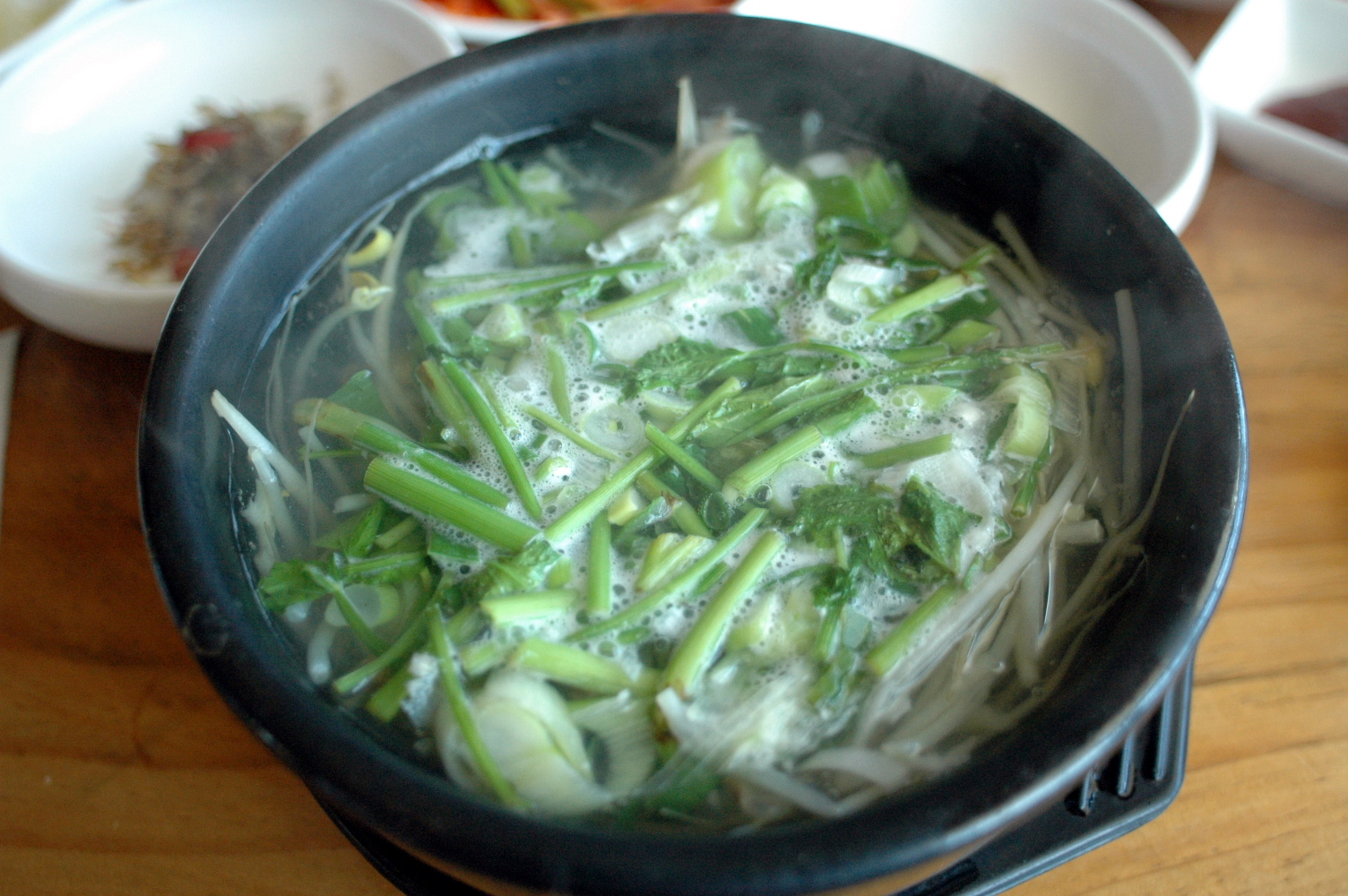
Bokguk (pufferfish soup)

== Availability ==
=== East Asia ===
==== China ====
Despite the comparatively lower consumption rate of the fish in comparison to other East Asian nations, the prevalence of fugu restaurants has experienced a significant surge across Chinese urban areas since 2016. The fish is only sold in a processed form (without organs) with a test certificate from the fishery. In 2023, processed raw farmed fugu across China is sold to ordinary customers online.

==== Japan ====
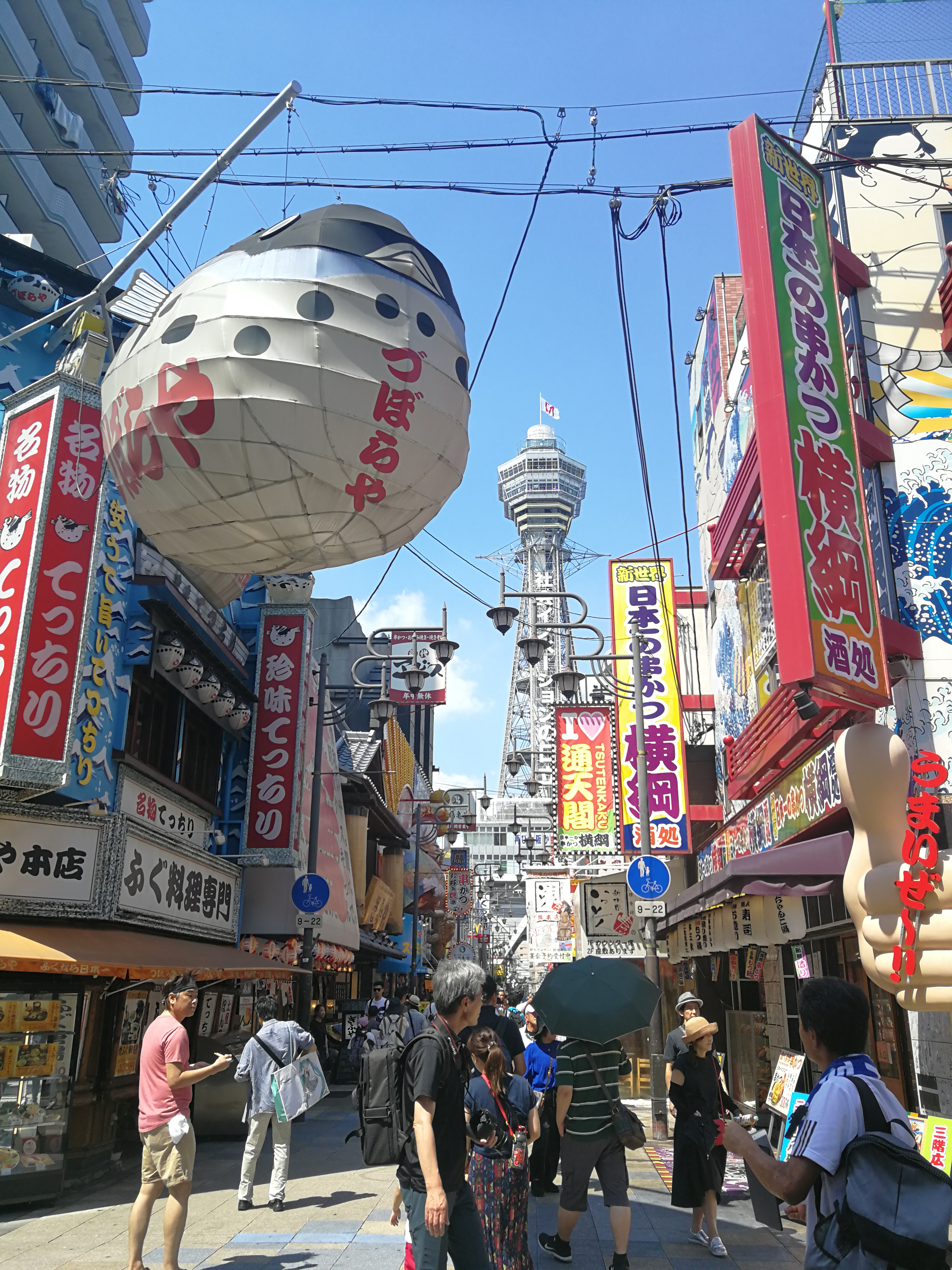
The iconic Zubora-ya advertising lantern overlooking the Shinsekai district in 2019

Most Japanese cities have one or more fugu restaurants, perhaps in clusters because of earlier restrictions, as proximity made it easier when transporting the seafood delicacy so as to preserve its long-term freshness upon being served to potential patrons. A famous restaurant specializing in fugu is Takefuku, in the upscale Ginza district in Tokyo. Zubora-ya was a famous fugu restaurant chain in Osaka, with branches in Shinsekai and Dotonbori, from its opening in 1920 until its closure in 2020.

The fugu is cleaned of its most toxic parts in Japan and freeze-flown to the United States under license in clearly customized plastic containers. Fugu chefs who cook in American restaurants are trained under the same rigorous and stringent specifications as in Japan. Pufferfish native to American waters, particularly the genus Sphoeroides, have also been consumed as a seafood delicacy, sometimes resulting in poisoning incidents.

==== Korea ====
In Korea, fugu is known as bok-eo (복어), the seafood delicacy is very popular in southern port cities such as Busan and Changwon. It is prepared in a number of ways resulting in a variety of dishes ranging from soups, raw fish and salads, all of which command a high price. Fugu Bulgogi and Jorim are popular in Daegu.

=== Europe ===
Sale of fish belonging to this family (Tetraodontidae) is forbidden altogether in the European Union. In Switzerland, the importation of fugu is legal, but only as long as it is purchased exclusively for private consumption.

=== North America ===
==== United States ====
Fugu chefs who cook in American restaurants are trained under the same rigorous and stringent specifications as in Japan. Pufferfish native to American waters, particularly the genus Spheroides, have also been consumed as a seafood delicacy, sometimes resulting in poisoning incidents. Japanese restaurateur Nobuyoshi Kuraoka waged a five-year legal battle with the U.S. Food and Drug Administration to allow the exclusive import of the Japanese Tiger puffer into his Manhattan restaurant, with the license finally being granted to him in 1989. By 2003, only seventeen restaurants in the United States were licensed to serve fugu; fourteen in New York State, twelve of which are in New York City.

== Social aspects ==
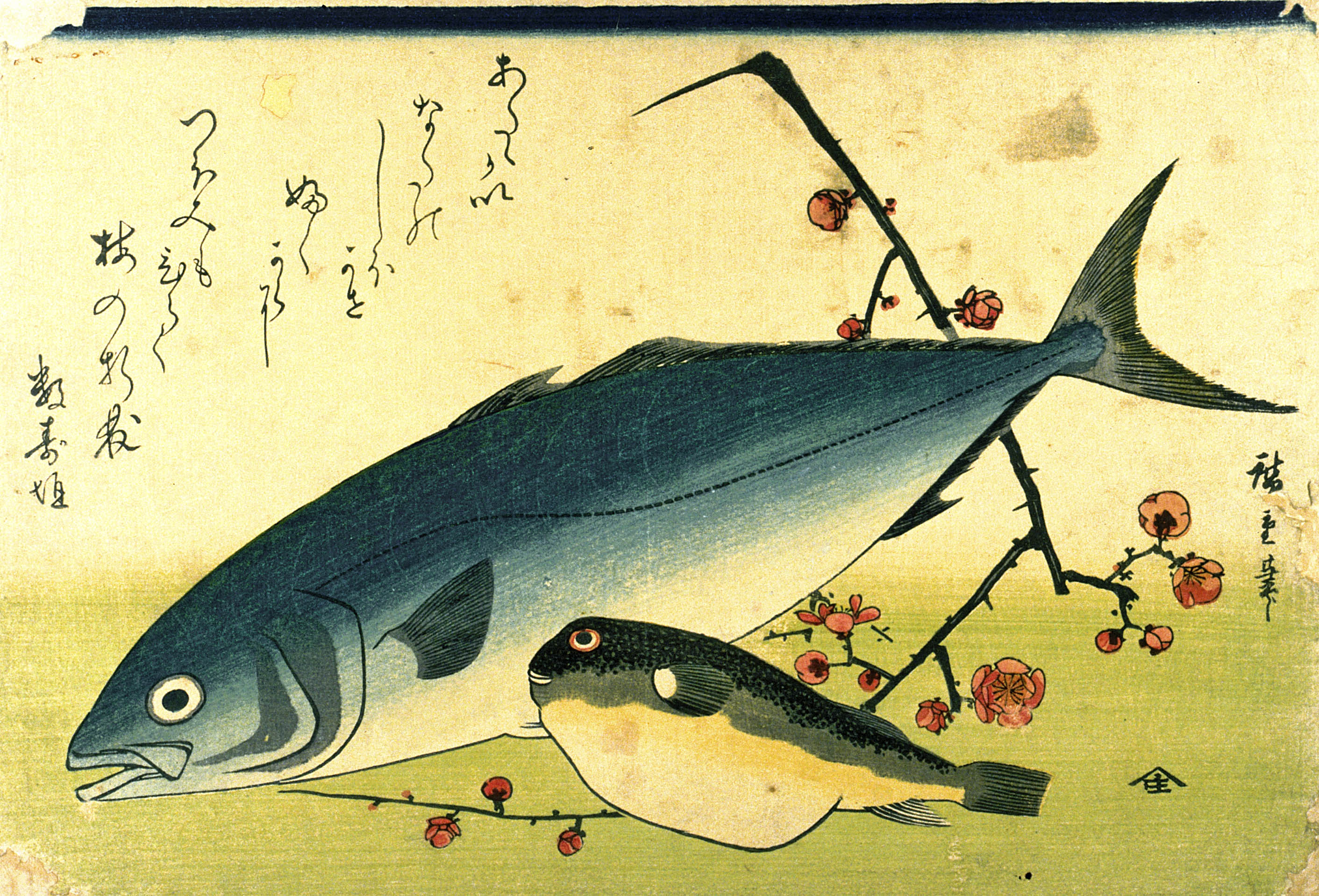
Fugu (right) and Japanese amberjack by Hiroshige (1832)

In the Kansai region of Japan, the slang word teppō, (鉄砲) meaning musket, rifle or gun, is used for the fish. This is a play of words on the verb ataru (当たる), which can mean to be poisoned or shot. In Shimonoseki region, the ancient pronunciation fuku is more common instead of the modern fugu. The former is also a homonym for good fortune whereas the latter is one for disabled. The Tsukiji fish market fugu association holds a service each year at the height of the fugu season, releasing hundreds of caught fugu into the Sumida River. A similar ceremony is also held at another large market in Shimonoseki.

A rakugo, or humorous short story, tells of three men who prepared a fugu stew but were unsure whether it was safe to eat. To test the stew, they gave some to a beggar. When it did not seem to do him any harm, they ate the stew. Later, they met the beggar again and were delighted to see that he was still in good health. After that encounter, the beggar, who had hidden the stew instead of eating it, knew that it was safe and he could eat it. The three men had been fooled by the wise beggar.

Lanterns can be made from the bodies of preserved fugu. These are occasionally seen outside of fugu restaurants, as children's toys, as folk art, or as souvenirs. Fugu skin is also made into everyday objects like wallets or waterproof boxes.

== Aquaculture ==
Scientists at Nagasaki University have succeeded in culturing non-toxic torafugu by restricting the fish's diet. The experiment included raising over 5,000 fish between the years 2001–2004, and analyzing the toxicity of muscle, skin, gonads, livers, and other organs. The team concluded that the amount of tetrodotoxin in all those parts was non-toxic, and it would allow for the safe preparation of fugu-kimo (puffer liver). Usuki, a town in Ōita Prefecture, has become known for selling non-poisonous fugu by 2008.

Blowfish, specifically the obscure pufferfish and the torafugu, has been farmed in China since 1993 under the state-owned Tianzheng company. As of 2012, most such fish is exported to Japan and South Korea, with a small domestic luxury market that has been operating under license since 2003.

== See also ==
- Cuisine of China
- Cuisine of Japan
- Cuisine of Korea
- Delicacy
- Fugu Plan
- "One Fish, Two Fish, Blowfish, Blue Fish"
- Shanghai Fugu Agreement
