= Tokiharu Abe =

Japanese ichthyologist

- 阿部 宗明
- Born: 3 April 1911; Tokyo, Japan
- Died: 9 August 1996 (aged 85); Tokyo, Japan
- Citizenship: Japanese
- Education: Ronbun Hakase from University of Tokyo
- Scientific career
- Fields: zoology, ichthyology

Tokiharu Abe (阿部 宗明, Abe Tokiharu; 3 April 1911 – 9 August 1996) was a Japanese ichthyologist and a government official of Ministry of Agriculture and Forestry.

== Career ==
Tokiharu Abe was born in Tabata, Tokyo, emigrated to Taiwan with his family in 1919, graduated from Taipei High School and was admitted to Tokyo Imperial University. He went on to School of Science of Tokyo Imperial University.

After studying at School of Science, he became a research student of zoology class at Tokyo Imperial University and was appointed as an agriculture and forestry engineer of Fisheries Experiment Station of Ministry of Agriculture and Forestry in 1947.

He received Ronbun Hakase, namely doctoral degree without finishing doctoral course study, from University of Tokyo by the thesis entitled “日本海近海産マフグ科魚類の分類学的研究 [The taxonomic study on the family fish of Takifugu of the sea around Japan]” in 1952. He became senior researcher at Tokai Regional Fisheries Research Institute and retired in 1977. He worked for the University Museum of the University of Tokyo.

He became the superintendent of Osakana Fukyu Sentā Shiryōkan (Tsukiji Fish Information Center and Museum).

Abe became notable for his taxonomic studies on the pufferfish (Tetraodontidae, Teleostei) from East Asia, in particular the genus Takifugu which he first described in 1949. He described further species like Sagamichthys abei, Centroscyllium kamoharai and Fugu obscurus. Species like Dentex abei, Pao abei and Chaunax abei were named in his honour. Abe became honorary member of Japanese Society of Systematic Zoology in 1991 and was also an honorary foreign member of the American Society of Ichthyologists and Herpetologists.

In 1996, he died from a cerebral hemorrhage in a hospital in Tokyo.

== Publications (selected) ==
- Abe, T., 1950. "New, rare or uncommon fishes from Japanese waters. I.Liparis franzi, new name". Japan. J. Ichthyol., 1: 135–139.
- Abe, T., 1952. "Taxonomic studies of the puffers (Tetraodontidae, Teleostei) from Japan and adjacent regions—VII. Concluding remarks, with the introduction of two new genera, Fugu and Boesemanichthys". Japan. J. Ichthyol., 2: 35–44, 93–97, 117–127.
- Abe, T., 1953. "New, rare or uncommon fishes from Japanese waters. II. Records of rare fishes of the families Diretmidae, Luvaridae and Tetragonuridae, with an appendix (description of a new species, Tetragonurus pacificus, from off the Solomon Islands)". Japan. J. Ichthyol., 3: 39–47.
- Abe, T., 1955. "On a new Pacific flying-fish, Prognichthys sealei, retaining five unbranched fin-rays above in the pectoral throughout life". Rec. Oceanogr. Works Japan, 2: 185–192.
- Abe, T., 1957a. "Notes on fishes taken from the stomach of whales taken in the Antarctic. I.Xenocyttus nemotoi, a new genus and new species of zeomorph fish of the subfamily Oreosomatinae Goode and Bean, 1895". Sci. Rep. Whales Res. Inst. (Tokyo), (12): 225–233.
- Abe, T. 1957b. "Illustrated descriptions of one thousand useful fishes, II", Morikita Shuppan, Tokyo. (In Japanese.)
- Abe, T., 1959. "New, rare or uncommon fishes from Japanese waters. VII. Description of a new species of Beryx", Japan. J. Ichthyol., 7: 157–163.
- Abe, T. 1960. "Description of a new species of lutjanid fish of the genusParacaesio from Japan". Japan. J. Ichthyol., 8: 56–62.
- Abe, T., 1961–1962. "Notes on some fishes of the subfamily Braminae, with the introduction of a new genus Pseudotaractes". Japan. J. Ichthyol., 8: 92–99, 101–114.
- Abe, T. 1966. "Description of a new squaloid shark, Centroscyllium kamoharai, from Japan". Japan. J. Ichthyol., 13: 190–198.
- Abe, T. and W. N. Eschmeyer. 1972. "A new species of the scorpionfish genus Helicolenus from the North Pacific Ocean". Proc. Calif. Acad. Sci., 4th Ser., 39: 47–53.
- Abe, T. and Y. Haneda. 1972. "Description of two new species of the ponyfish genusLeiognathus from Indonesia". Sci. Rep. Yokosuka City Mus. (Nat. Hist.), (19): 1–6.
- Abe, T. and Y. Haneda. 1973. "Description of a new fish of the genus Photoblepharon (family Anomalopidae) from the Red Sea". Bull. Sea Fish. Res. Stn, Haifa, 60: 57–62.
- Abe, T. and H. Hotta. 1963. "Description of a new deep-sea fish of the genus Rondeletia from Japan". Japan. J. Ichthyol., 10: 43–48.
- Abe, T., S. Kojima, and T. Kosakai. 1963. "Description of a new nomeid fish from Japan". Japan. J. Ichthyol., 11: 31–35.
- Abe, T., R. Marumo and K. Kawaguchi. 1965a. "Description of a new cetomimid fish from Suruga Bay". Japan. J. Ichthyol., 12: 57–63.
- Abe, T., R. Muramo and K. Kawaguchi. 1965b. "Description of a new alepocephalid fish from Suruga Bay". Japan. J. Ichthyol., 13: 67–72.
- Abe, T., M. Miki and M. Asai. 1977. "Description of a new garden eel from Japan". UO, (28): 1–8.
