= Elmer's Island Refuge =

Protected area in Louisiana, United States

Elmer's Island Wildlife Refuge
- Elmer's Island WMA
- IUCN category V (protected landscape/seascape)
- Location within Louisiana
- Location: Jefferson Parish, Louisiana
- Coordinates: 29°10′55.20″N 90°04′16.94″W
- Area: 1,145 acres (4.63 km^{2})
- Established: July 3, 2009
- Governing body: Louisiana Department of Wildlife and Fisheries

Elmer's Island Wildlife Refuge is a 1,145 acres (463 ha) coastal wildlife sanctuary and wildlife management area referred to as the Elmer's Island complex. It is located across Caminada Pass from Grand Isle on Elmer's island, which is part of the Caminada headlands and not an actual island. The refuge consists of Saltwater marsh, coastal dunes and beaches and is managed by the Louisiana Department of Wildlife and Fisheries (LDWF).

== History ==
Elmer's Island was formerly called Goat Island. It is part of the Cheniere Caminada peninsula. In 1949 Doctor Charles W. "W.J." Elmer, bought the location for a private fishing area. He later opened it to paid camping. There was an airstrip and a sea plane canal. After Dr. Elmer passed in 2001 or 2002, the site was eventually closed. The property was listed for sale by the heirs. The Louisiana Wildlife Federation (LWF) launched a campaign to get the state to buy the land. In 2006, U.S. Senator David Vitter began a process to appropriate $1.75 million for Louisiana to acquire the 1,700-acres. The state of Louisiana claimed expropriation on 244 acres (99 ha) and in 2009 classified it as a wildlife refuge. In 2014, the state purchased an additional 877 acres (355 ha). A 1 acre (0.40 ha) was added in 2015 and 37 acres (15 ha) in 2016. The later additions were added as a wildlife management area and the entire area is named the Elmer's Island complex.

In 2018, officials of Grand Isle made an agreement with the LDWF Secretary to allow the Grand Isle Independent Levee District (GIILD) to operate and manage a Grand Isle Airport at Elmer’s Island. Conservationists and public outcry caused this agreement to be rescinded. Hurricanes Rita, Gustav and Ike heavily damaged the island causing severe erosion, habitat destruction, and the 1.5 miles (2.4 km) gravel access road was mostly washed out and inundated. The area was severely damaged by the Deepwater Horizon oil spill in 2010. Between 2013 and 2016 a massive undertaking by the Coastal Protection and Restoration Authority (CPRA) to rebuild the area, creating 1,059 acres (429 ha) of new barrier, dune, and beach habitat. Elmer's Island was reopened October 31, 2016. The refuge was closed from September 2021, due to the severe damage caused by Hurricane Ida and reopened February 4, 2022, after repairs were made.

== Fauna ==
There is an abundance of wildlife in the refuge. There are over 170 bird species on the island, with 40 bird species of conservation concern, and a crucial stopover for around 50 migratory species.

=== Animals ===
- Malaclemys terrapin: Diamondback terrapin
- Caretta caretta: Loggerhead sea turtle
- Chelonia mydas: Green sea turtle
- Dermochelys coriacea: Leatherback sea turtle
- Ertmochelys imbricata: Hawksbill sea turtle
- Lepidochelys kempii: Kemp's ridley sea turtle
- Nerodia clarkii: Saltmarsh watersnake
- Canis latrans: Coyote
- Sigmodon hispidus Hispid: Cotton rat
- Oryzomys palustris: Marsh rice rat
- Mus musculus: House mouse
- Rattus norvegicus: Brown or Norway rat
- Sylvilagus floridanus: Eastern cottontail rabbit
- Myocastor coypus: Nutria
- Sus scrofa: Wild boar
- Tursiops truncatus: Common bottlenose dolphin

=== Birds ===
- Anas fulvigula Mottled duck
- Ammodramus maritimus Seaside sparrow
- Ammodramus nelsoni Nelson's sparrow
- Anas acuta Northern pintail
- Asio flammeus Short-eared owl
- Aythya affinis: Lesser scaup duck
- Aythya americana Redhead duck
- Aythya valisineria: Canvasback duck
- Bartramia longicauda: Upland sandpiper
- Botaurus lentiginosus: American bittern
- Calidris alpina: Dunlin
- Calidris canutus: Red knot shorebird
- Calidris subruficollis: Buff-breasted sandpiper
- Charadrius alexandrinus: Snowy plover
- Charadrius melodus: Piping plover
- Charadrius wilsonia: Wilson's plover
- Cistothorus palustris: Marsh wren
- Cistothorus platensis: Sedge wren
- Egretta rufescens: Reddish egret
- Elanoides forficatus: Swallow-tailed kite
- Falco peregrinus: Peregrine falcon
- Gelochelidon nilotica: Gull-billed tern
- Haematopus palliatus: American oystercatcher
- Haliaeetus leucocephalus: Bald eagle
- Hydroprogne caspia: Caspian tern
- Ixobrychus exilis: Least bittern
- Lanius ludovicianus: Loggerhead shrike
- Limnodromus griseus: Short-billed dowitcher
- Limosa fedoa: Marbled godwit
- Numenius americanus: Long-billed curlew
- Pandion haliaetus: Osprey
- Passerina ciris: Painted bunting
- Pelecanus occidentalis: Brown pelican
- Platalea ajaja: Roseate spoonbill
- Plegadis falcinellus: Glossy ibis
- Rallus elegans: King rail
- Rallus longirostris: Clapper rail
- Rynchops niger: Black skimmer
- Sterna forsteri: Forster's tern
- Sterna hirundo: Common tern
- Sternula antillarum: Coastal least tern
- Sternula antillarum: Interior least tern
- Thalasseus maximus: Royal tern
- Thalasseus sandvicensis: Sandwich tern

=== Fish and crustaceans ===
- Brevoortia patronus: Gulf menhaden
- Ariopsis felis: Sea catfish
- Scomberomorus maculatus: Spanish mackerel
- Cynoscion nebulosus: Spotted seatrout
- Leiostomus xanthurus: Spot fish
- Harengula jaguana: Scaled sardine
- Callinectes sapidus: Blue crab
- Pomatomus saltatrix: Bluefish
- Bagre marinus: Gafftopsail catfish
- Elops saurus: Ladyfish
- Cynoscion arenarius: Sand seatrout
- Caranx hippos: Crevalle jack
- Peprilus paru: Harvestfish
- Menticirrhus americanus: Southern kingfish
- Litopenaeus setiferus: White shrimp
- Menticirrhus littoralis: Gulf kingfish
- Chloroscombrus chrysurus: Atlantic bumper
- Mugil cephalus: Striped mullet
- Micropogonias undulatus: Atlantic croaker
- Anchoa mitchilli: Bay anchovy
- Palaemonetes Palaemon pugio: Grass shrimp
- Micropogonias undulatus: Atlantic croaker
- Brevoortia patronus: Gulf menhaden
- Mugil cephalus: Striped mullet
- Sardinella aurita: Round sardinella (Spanish sardine)
- Trachinotus carolinus: Florida pompano
- Harengula jaguana: Scaled sardine
- Anchoa hepsetus: Striped anchovy or broad-striped anchovy
- Menticirrhus americanus: Southern kingfish
- Litopenaeus setiferus: White shrimp
- Anchoa lyolepis: Dusky anchovy or shortfinger anchovy
- Callinectes sapidus: Blue crab
- Larimus fasciatus: Banded drum
- Farfantepenaeus aztecus: Brown shrimp
- Menidia beryllina: Inland silverside
- Menticirrhus littoralis: Gulf kingfish
- Callinectes similis: Lesser blue crab
