= Great Bay (New Jersey) =

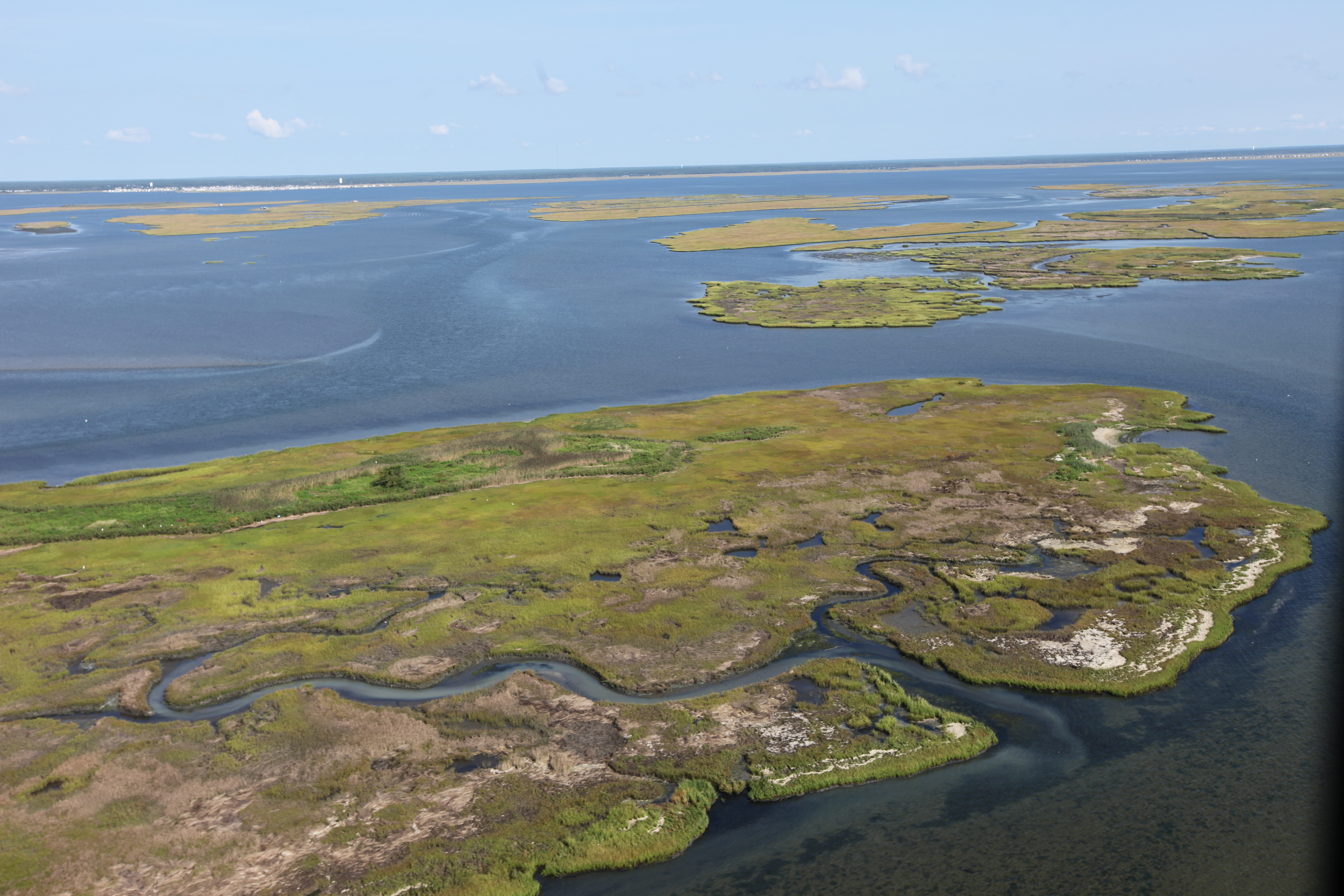
- Islands near Great Bay during summer.

- Location within New Jersey
- Location: New Jersey, U.S.
- Coordinates: 39°30′36″N 74°21′55″W
- Type: Bay
- Max. depth: 43 ft (13 m)
- Settlements: Brigantine, New Jersey

Great Bay is located in southern New Jersey's Atlantic Coastal Plain in Ocean and Atlantic Counties, about ten miles (16 km) north of Atlantic City and is about 5.5 miles (8.85 km) northwest of Brigantine, and 5.5 miles southwest of Beach Haven. The Mullica River flows into the bay, and together they form the Mullica River - Great Bay estuary habitat. The bay is connected to the Atlantic Ocean via the Little Egg Inlet. Great Bay is considered one of the least-disturbed marine wetlands habitats in the northeastern United States.

== General ==
Great Bay averages about 1.5 meters (4.9 feet) in depth, and extensive areas of the estuarine substratum are covered with benthic algae and some vascular plants (seagrasses). Eelgrass (Zostera marina) beds are an important component of the submerged aquatic vegetation (SAV) community in Great Bay, generally where depths are 1 meter (3.3 feet) or less but, due to the slightly greater depth in Great Bay, these are not as ubiquitous as they are in the Barnegat/Manahawkin/Little Egg system to the north. Extensive areas (13.58 km^{2} (3,360 acres) of intertidal sandflats and mudflats occur in the bay, a result of the sediment load from the Mullica River and the movement of sand in through Little Egg Inlet.

== Sealife ==
Finfish make up an important component of the bay's ecosystem. The bay provides an important nursery area for bluefish, weakfish, menhaden, and spot (Leiostomas xanthurus), as well as spawning habitat for winter spawners such as sandlance (Ammodytes americanus) and winter flounder and summer spawners like bay anchovy (Anchoa mitchilli), silversides (Menidia spp.), gobies (Gobiosoma spp.), wrasses (Labridae spp.), and northern pipefish (Syngnathus fuscus).

Fisheries investigations were conducted in the 1970s by the New Jersey Department of Environmental Protection to determine the fishery composition and life stages of estuarine fish using this specific bay. Sixty-six species were caught during these studies and, as in the Barnegat system, the catches were dominated by forage species, with bay anchovy and Atlantic silverside (Menidia menidia) being very abundant. The top ranked fish by their relative abundance were: bay anchovy (Anchoa mitchilli), Atlantic silverside (Menidia menidia), silver perch (Bairdiella chrysoura), alewife (Alosa pseudoharengus), striped killifish (Fundulus majalis), sea herring (Clupea harengus), white perch (Morone americana), northern puffer (Sphoeroides maculatus), oyster toadfish (Opsanus tau), and striped anchovy (Anchoa hepsetus). Commercial fisheries activities include the harvest of northern quahog (Mercenaria mercenaria), blue crab (Callinectes sapidus), white perch, winter flounder, and American eel (Anguilla rostrata). The bay is an important spawning and nursery area for blue crab. The area between Graveling Point and the Wading River tributaries supports large eastern oyster (Crassostrea virginica) beds, many of which are considered extremely productive seed beds.

== Mullica River - Great Bay estuary ==
The Mullica River - Great Bay estuary habitat complex encompasses the entire Mullica River - Great Bay estuary and tidal river from its headwater streams to its connection with the New York Bight through Little Egg Inlet. Included are all riverine and estuarine wetlands to the limit of tidal influence of the Mullica River and its tributaries, the open waters of Great Bay and adjacent salt marsh habitat from the mouth of the Mullica River to Little Egg Inlet, and the inlet itself. This nearly pristine estuary provides seasonal or year-round habitat for a variety of anadromous, estuarine, marine, and freshwater fish and shellfish, nesting and migratory waterbirds and raptors, migratory and wintering waterfowl, and rare brackish and freshwater tidal communities and plants. Also included in the habitat complex are several small palustrine (nontidal) wetlands immediately adjacent to the estuary that contain exemplary rare natural communities and plant occurrences. Great Bay is part of the New Jersey backbarrier lagoon system, and the resources here are similar to those found in the Barnegat Bay complex to the north and the Brigantine Bay and Marsh complex to the south. The watershed of the Mullica River in the New Jersey Pinelands is described as part of the New Jersey Pinelands narrative. The majority of the watershed is protected by the Pinelands Comprehensive Management Plan, several large federal and state wildlife management areas, and state forests.

The coastal salt, brackish, and freshwater marshes in the Mullica River - Great Bay estuary are extremely important to waterfowl, raptors, wading birds, and shorebirds. Raptors utilize the tidal marshes for nesting and for foraging throughout the year. Osprey nest on platforms in numerous locations throughout the salt marshes of this system. Significant concentrations of migrating and wintering waterfowl occur in the Mullica River - Great Bay estuary, with an average of over 12,000 waterfowl counted on midwinter aerial surveys.
