= Surf Candy =

Fly fishing pattern

- Artificial fly
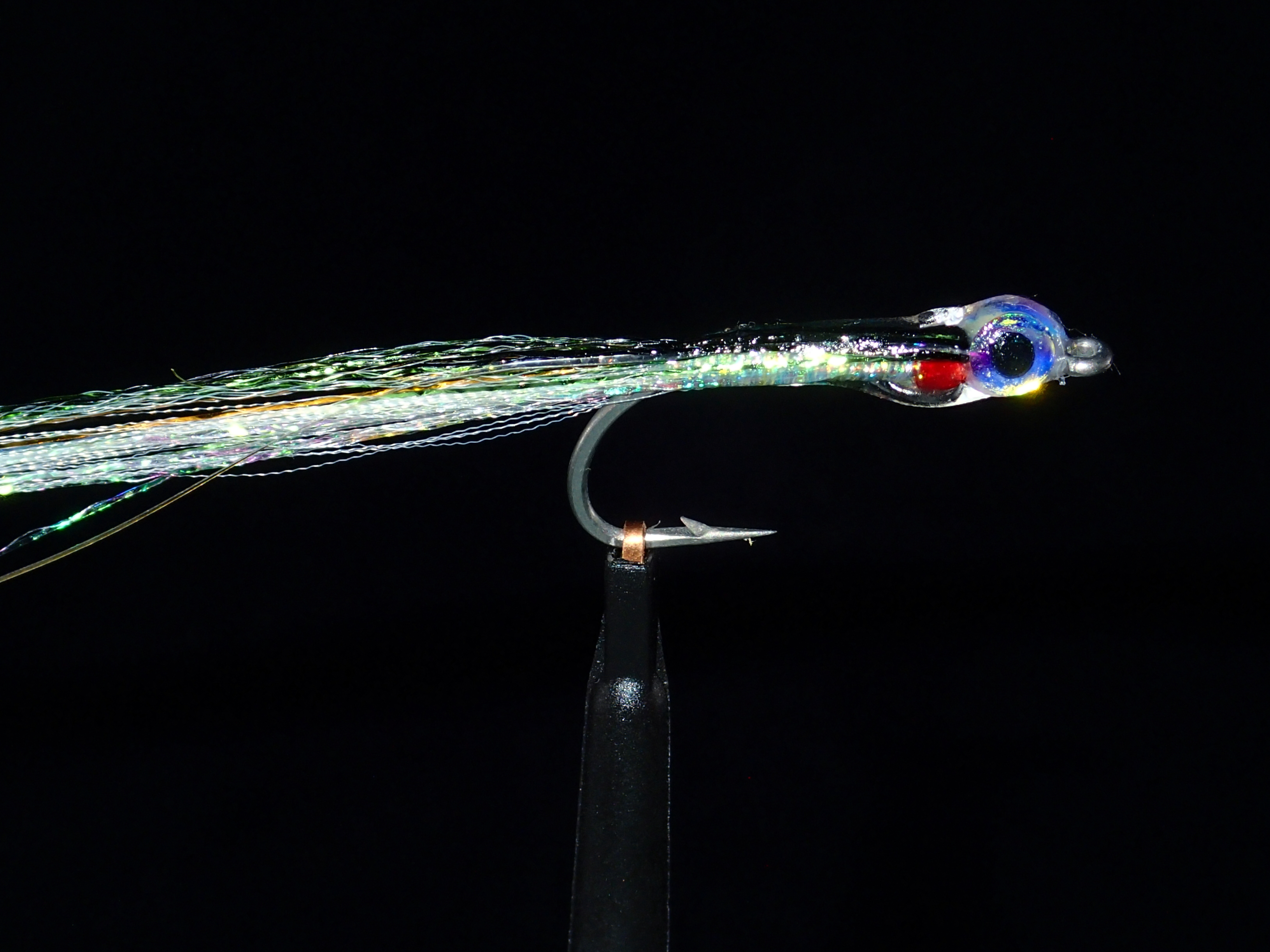
- Surf Candy variation
- Type: Saltwater streamer

History
- Creator: Bob Popovics
- Created: 1970s

Materials
- Typical sizes: 4 - 4/0
- Typical hooks: Standard saltwater or long shank streamer
- Thread: 3/0 white monochord or monofilament
- Body: Silver Mylar
- Wing: White ultrahair
- Cheek: Red floss or red marker
- Topping: Green Flashabou or Krystal Flash

Uses
- Primary use: Saltwater fly fishing. Imitates sand eels or other small baitfish

Surf Candy is style of artificial fly used primarily in saltwater fly fishing to imitate small sand eels and other small baitfish. The style was developed by American fly tier Bob Popovics in the 1970s for bluefish, tuna and striped bass on the Atlantic coast.

== Origins ==
Surf Candy as a saltwater fly design was originated by Bob Popovics, an American fly tier from New Jersey. Popovics pioneered the use of epoxy to create durability and translucency in saltwater flies. Bluefish were notorious for quickly damaging flies with their sharp teeth and Popovics began experimenting with epoxy bodied flies in 1970 to improve durability. However, it wasn't until the late 1980s that Popovics introduced the Surf Candy style to the public. The original Surf Candies were tied with bucktail or polar bear hair but the flies quickly evolved with the use of synthetic materials like ultrahair. Although the original purpose of the epoxy was for durability, it had the added side-effect of providing translucency for the body, a characteristic that enhanced imitations of a wide variety of baitfish.

== Imitates ==
The original Surf Candy flies were tied to imitate sand eels or sand lances, Atlantic silversides or spearing, bay anchovy (often called rainfish) and finger mullet (young mullet).

== Materials ==
The original surf candy flies were tied with white buck tail wings and without eyes. Popovics coated the entire head and body of the fly with epoxy for durability. Early surf candy flies were also tied with polar bear fur for added translucency. Original versions used a red marker to place a red slash behind to the head to simulate gills. Today's surf candy flies are typically tied with synthetic fibers, Mylar flash for accents and body and some form of eyes. Instead of epoxy, fly tiers use various ultraviolet or blue light cured cements for a faster drying time. Epoxy or UV cured cements are applied to the entire body of the fly from hook eye to hook bend for durability and translucency. Eyes can be added to the head of the fly a more realistic pattern. Most surf candy flies are tied with clear monofilament threads to enhance the effects of translucency.

== Variations and sizes ==
Surf Candy flies are typically tied on size 4 through 4/0 saltwater hooks. By layering different colors, textures and amount of synthetic fibers fly tiers can create a the desired profile of the different baitfish the Surf Candy imitates.

== Gallery ==
Surf Candy variations
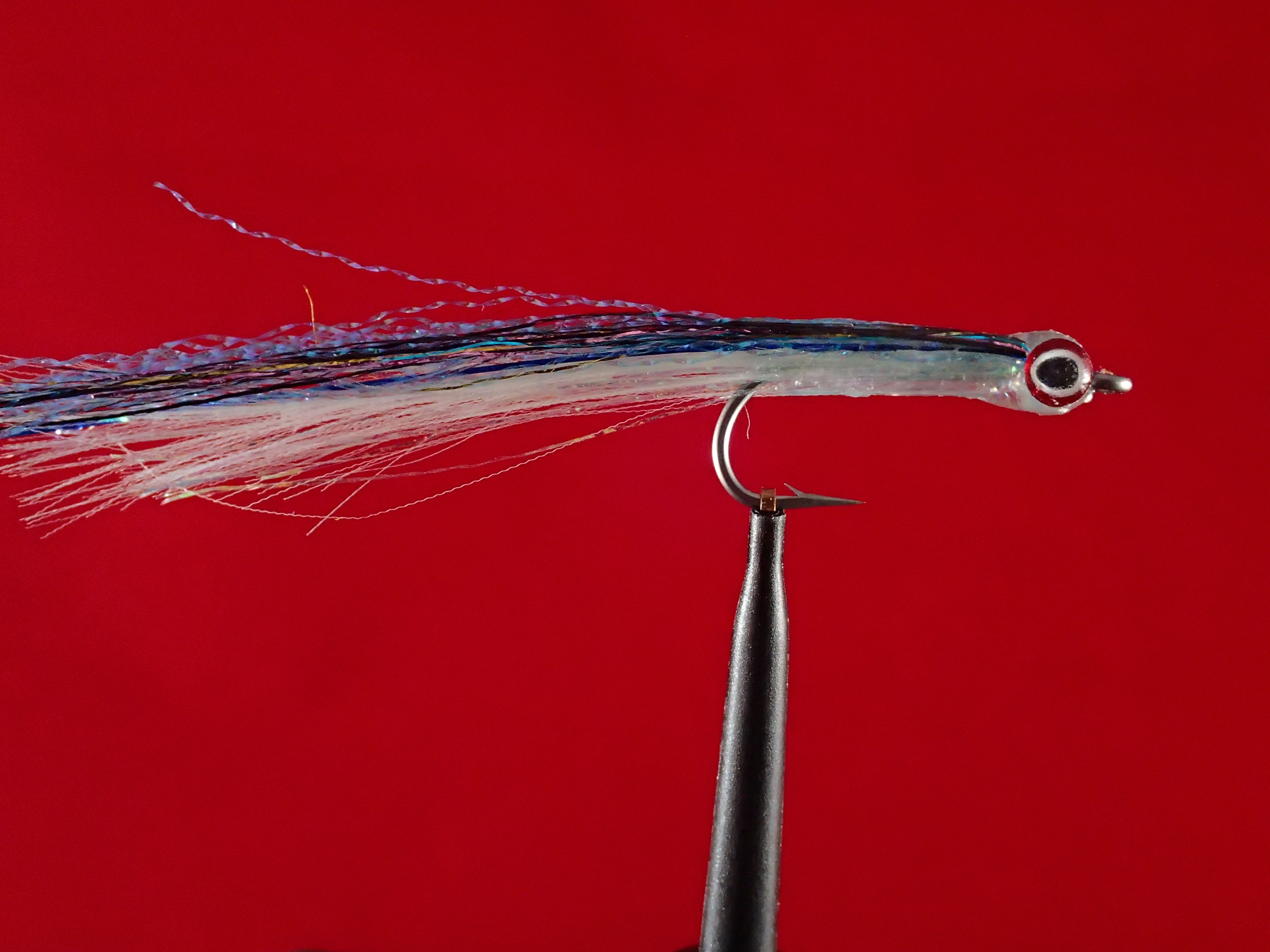
Blue backed surf candy

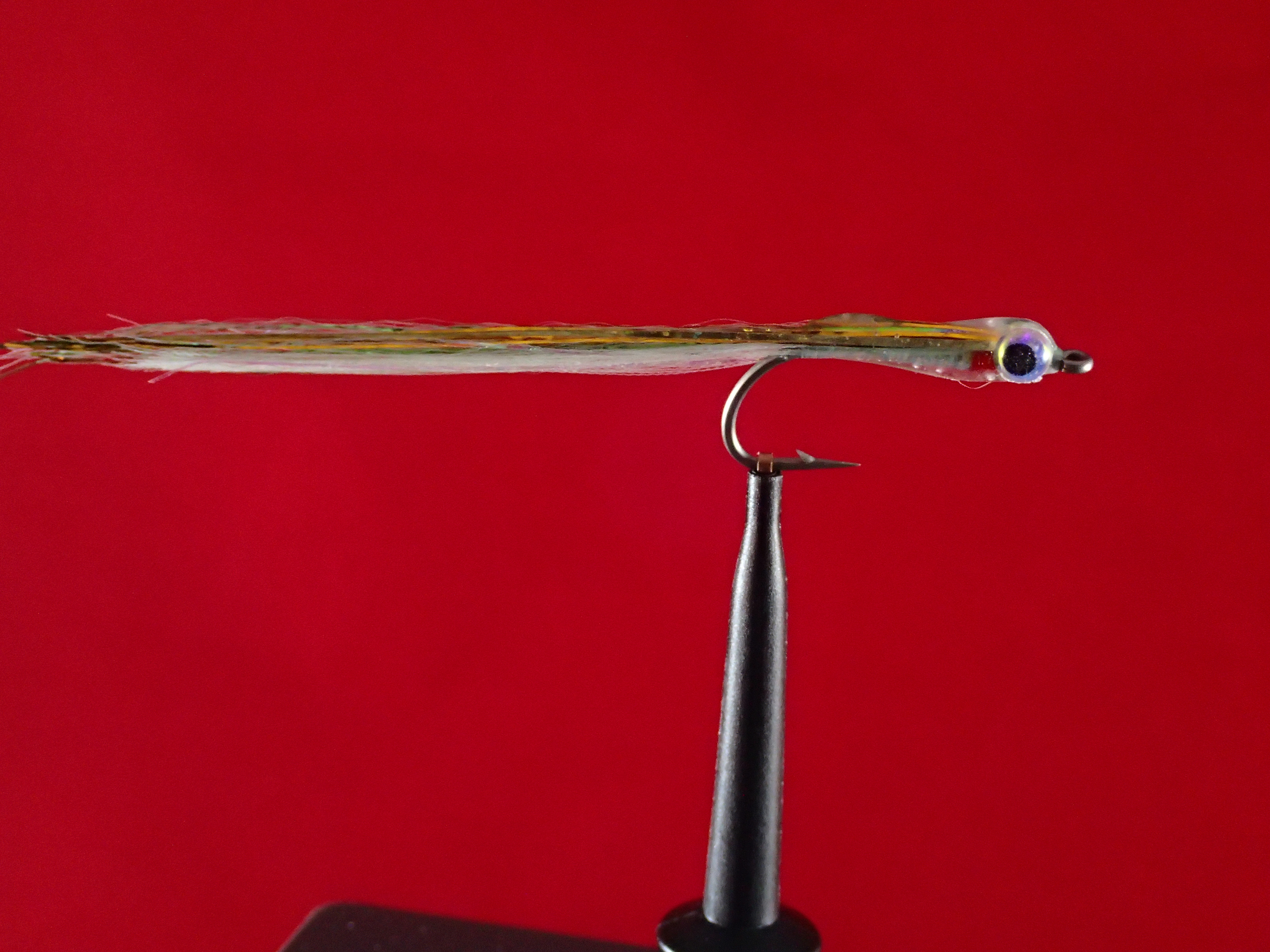
Gold backed surf candy
