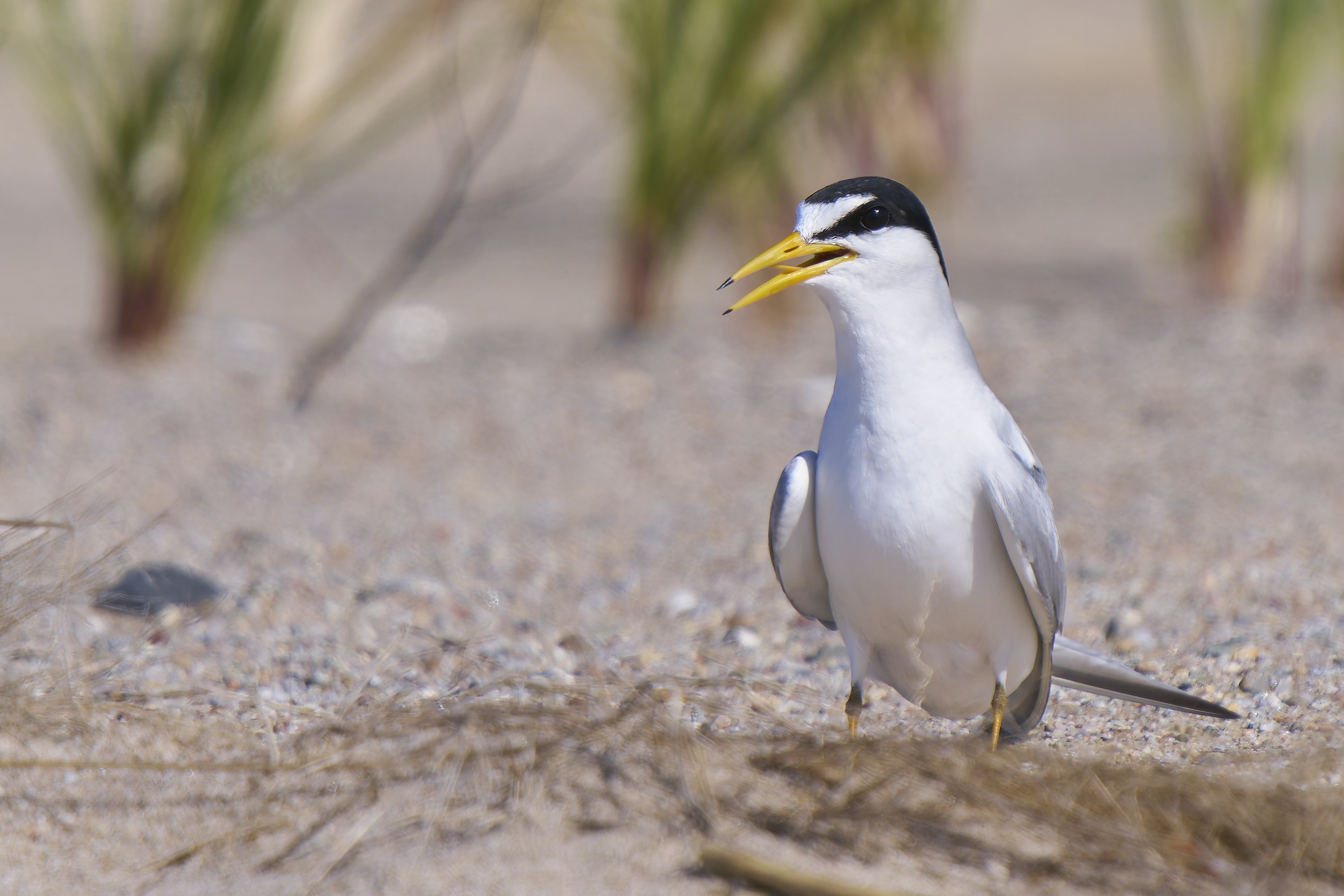

Conservation status
- Least Concern (IUCN 3.1)

Scientific classification
- Kingdom: Animalia
- Phylum: Chordata
- Class: Aves
- Order: Charadriiformes
- Family: Laridae
- Genus: Sternula
- Species: S. antillarum

Binomial name
- Sternula antillarum Lesson, 1847

Synonyms
- Sterna antillarum

= Least tern =

Species of bird

The least tern (Sternula antillarum) is a species of tern that breeds in North America and locally in northern South America. It is closely related to, and was formerly often considered conspecific with, the little tern of the Old World. Other close relatives include the yellow-billed tern and Peruvian tern, both from South America.

It is a small tern, 22–24 cm (8.7–9.4 in) long, with a wingspan of 50 cm (20 in), and weighing 39–52 g (1.4–1.8 oz). The upper parts are a fairly uniform pale gray, and the underparts white. The head is white, with a black cap and line through the eye to the base of the bill, and a small white forehead patch above the bill; in winter, the white forehead is more extensive, with a smaller and less sharply defined black cap. The bill is yellow with a small black tip in summer, all blackish in winter. The legs are yellowish. The wings are mostly pale gray, but with conspicuous black markings on their outermost primaries. It flies over water with fast, jerky wingbeats and a distinctive hunchback appearance, with the bill pointing slightly downward.

It is migratory, wintering in Central America, the Caribbean and northern South America. Many spend their whole first year in their wintering area. It has occurred as a vagrant to Europe, with one record in Great Britain and one in Ireland.

It differs from the little tern mainly in that its rump and tail are gray, not white, and it has a different, more squeaking call; from the yellow-billed tern in being paler gray above and having a black tip to the bill; and from the Peruvian tern in being paler gray above and white (not pale gray) below and having a shorter black tip to the bill.

== Subspecies ==
The differences among the three subspecies may not be as great as had been thought.

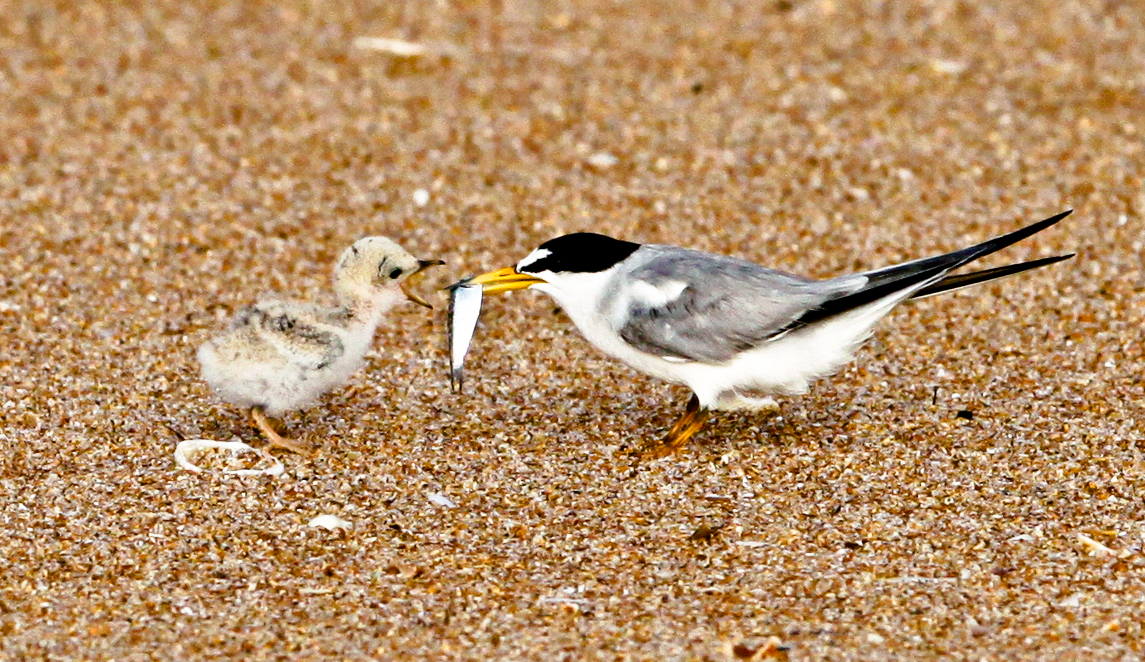
Parent feeding a small chick in Florida, USA

- Sternula antillarum athalassos – (Burleigh & Lowery, 1942): Breeds on the rivers of the Arkansas River, Mississippi River, Brazos River, Trinity River, and Rio Grande basins; winters south to northern Brazil.
- Sternula antillarum antillarum – (Lesson, 1847): nominate, Breeds on the Atlantic coast of North America, from Maine south along the east and south coasts of the United States, Bermuda, the Caribbean, and Venezuela; winters south to northern Brazil.
- Sternula antillarum browni – (Mearns, 1916): California least tern. Breeds on the Pacific coast of North America, from central California south to western Mexico; winters mainly in Central America.

Additionally, least terns of an unknown subspecies were found in 2012 nesting on the Big Island of Hawaii.

== Conservation and status ==
=== Sternula antillarum antillarum ===
The population is about 21,500 pairs; it is not currently considered federally threatened, though it is considered threatened in many of the states in which it breeds. Threats include egg and fledgling predators, high tides and recreational use of nesting beaches.

=== Sternula antillarum athalassos ===
The interior subspecies, with a current population of about 7000 pairs, was listed as an endangered subspecies in 1985 (estimated 1000 breeding pairs), due to loss of habitat caused by dams, reservoirs, channelization, and other changes to river systems. It was delisted on 13 January 2021.

=== Sternula antillarum browni ===
The western population, the California least tern, was listed as an endangered species in 1972 with a population of about 600 pairs. With aggressive management, mainly by the exclusion of humans via fencing, the Californian population has rebounded in recent years to about 4500 pairs, a marked increase from 582 pairs in 1974 when census work began, though it is still listed as an endangered subspecies. The California subspecies breeds on beaches and bays of the Pacific Ocean within a very limited range of southern California, in San Francisco Bay and in northwestern Mexico. While numbers have gradually increased with its protected status, it is still vulnerable to predators, natural disasters or further disturbance by humans. Recent threats include the gull-billed tern (Sterna nilotica), which can decrease reproductive success in a colony to less than 10%.

== Nesting and breeding behavior ==
The least tern arrives at its breeding grounds in late April. The breeding colonies are not dense and may appear along either marine or estuarine shores, or on sandbar islands in large rivers, or in areas free from humans or predators. Courtship typically takes place removed from the nesting colony site, usually on an exposed tidal flat or beach. Only after courtship has confirmed mate selection does nesting begin by mid-May and is usually complete by mid-June. Courtship takes the form of either an aerial display in which the female follows the flight of the male or through courtship feeding. Nests are situated on barren to sparsely vegetated places near water, normally on sandy or gravelly substrates. In the southeastern United States, many breeding sites are on white gravel rooftops. In the San Francisco Bay region, breeding typically takes place on abandoned salt flats. Where the surface is hard, this species may use an artificial indentation (such as a deep dried footprint) to form the nest basin.

The nest density may be as low as several per acre, but in San Diego County, densities of 200 nests per acre have been observed. Most commonly the clutch size is two or three, but it is not rare to consist of either one or four eggs. Adults are known to wet themselves and shake off the water over the eggs when arriving at the nest. Both females and males incubate the eggs for a period of about three weeks, and both parents tend the semiprecocial young. Young birds can fly at age four weeks. After the formation of the new families, groupings of birds may appear at lacustrine settings in proximity to the coast. Late-season nesting may be renests or the result of late arrivals. In any case, the bulk of the population has left the breeding grounds by the end of August.

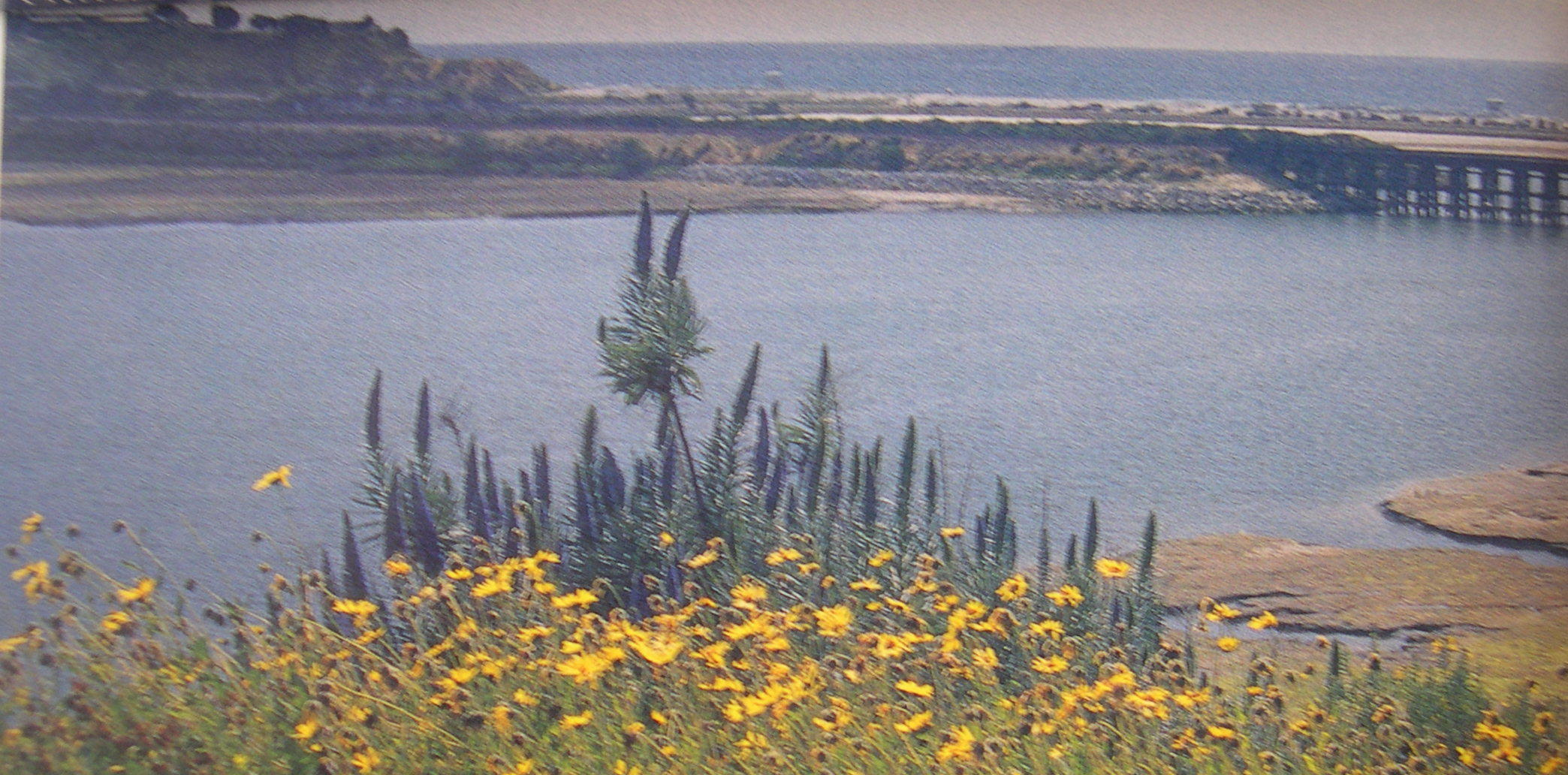
Batiquitos Lagoon, a breeding site in San Diego County, California

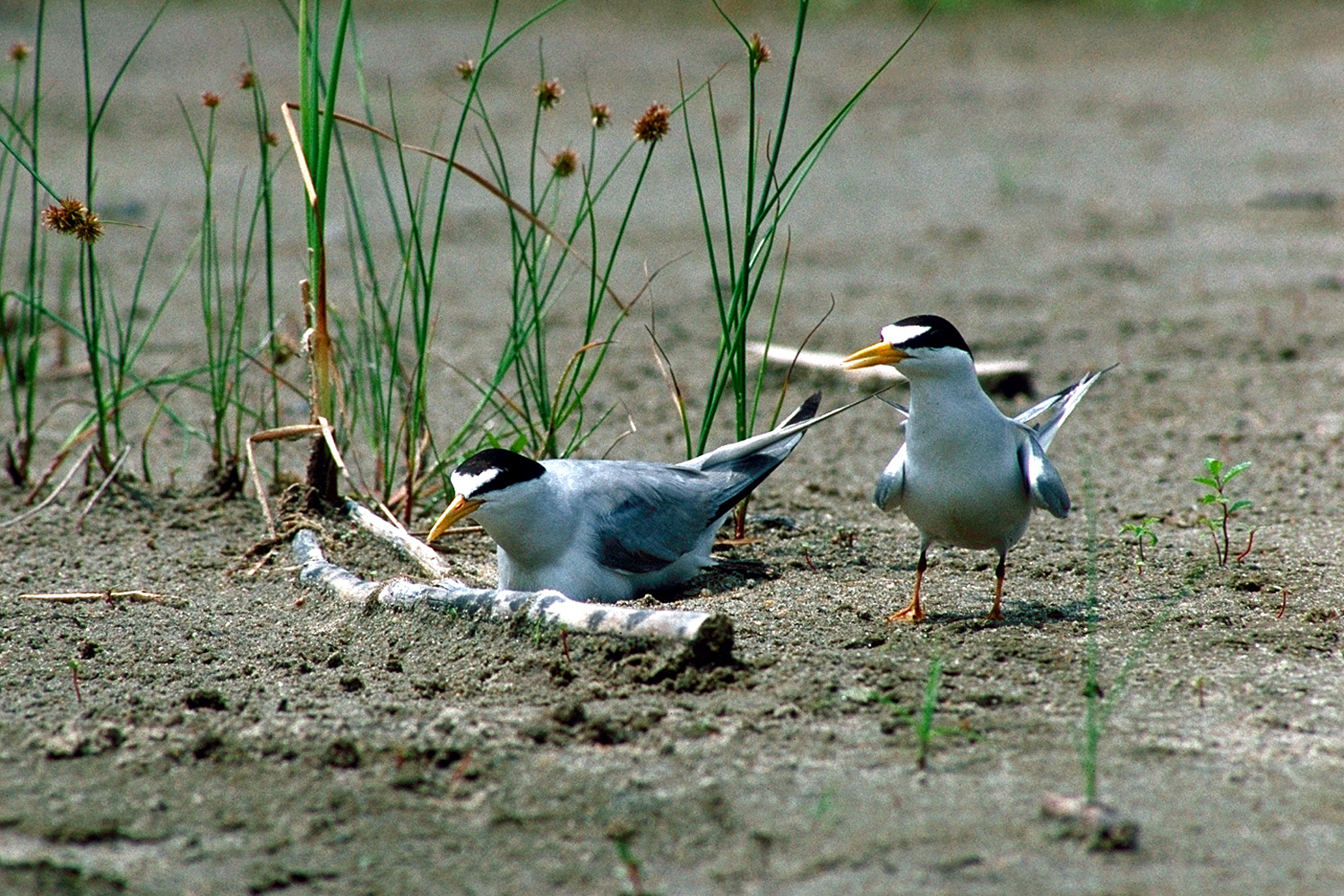
Nesting pair on the Missouri River in South Dakota

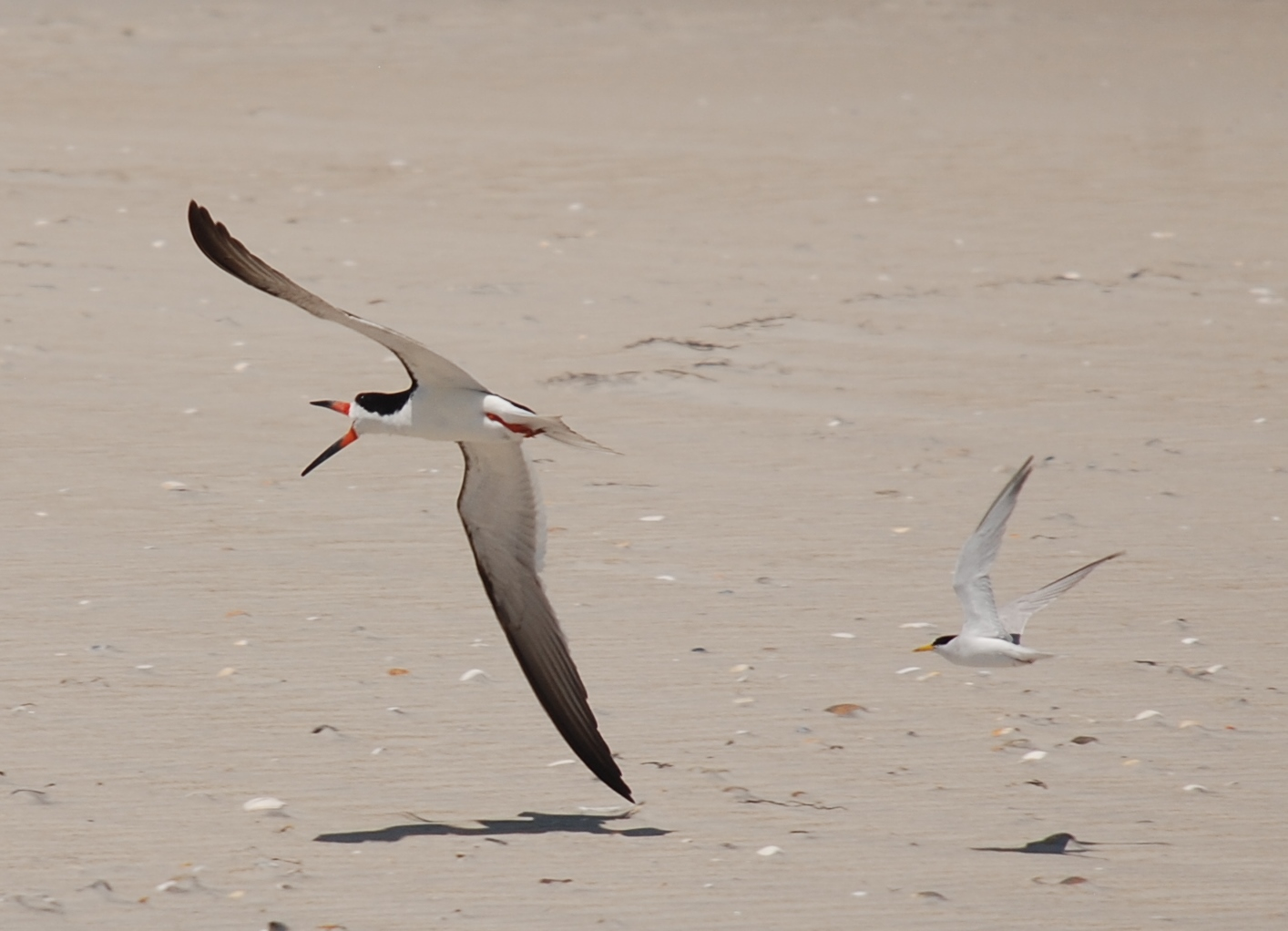
A least tern attacking a much larger black skimmer near Drum Inlet in North Carolina, United States

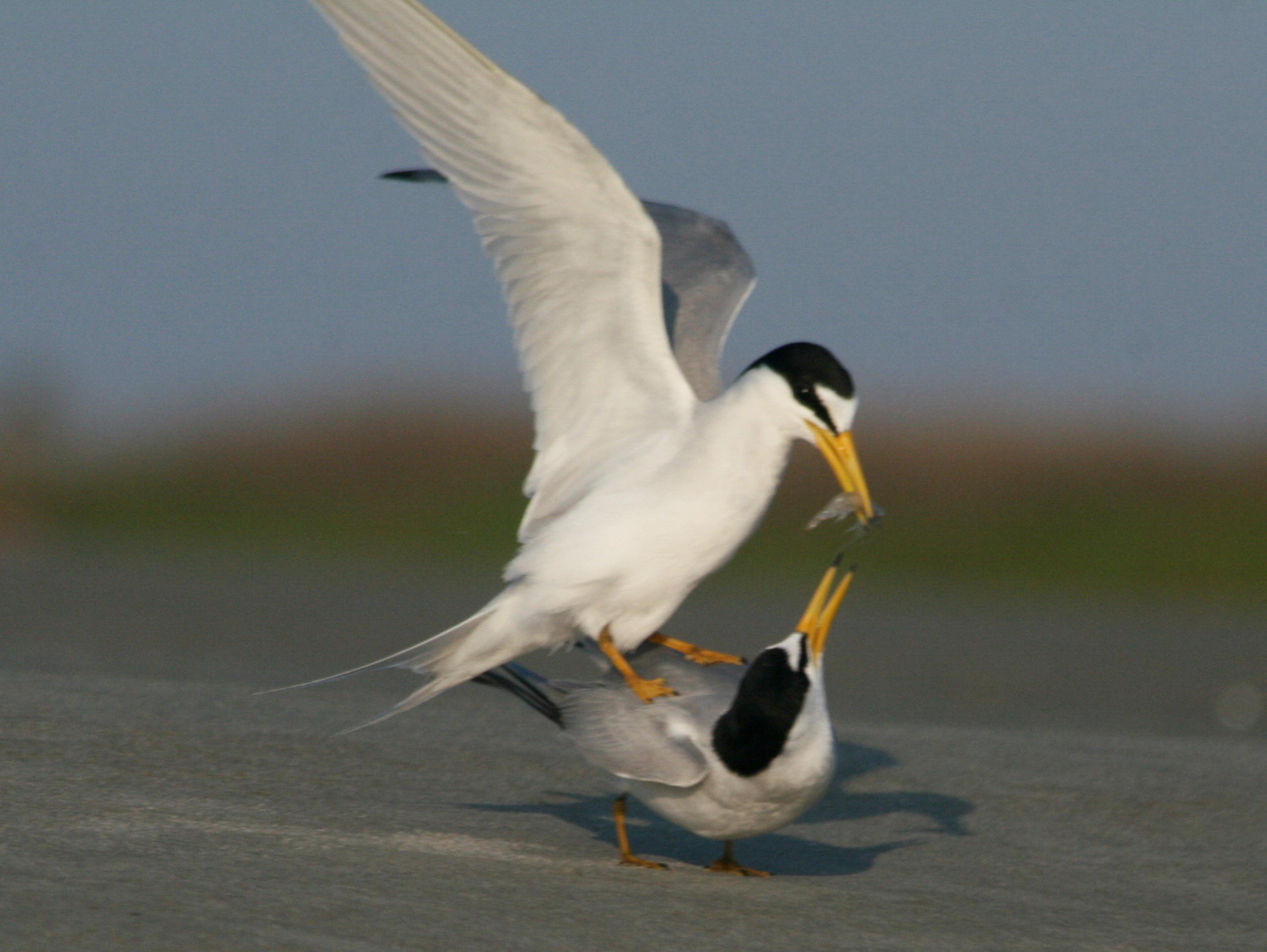
Mating pair at Sunset Beach, North Carolina

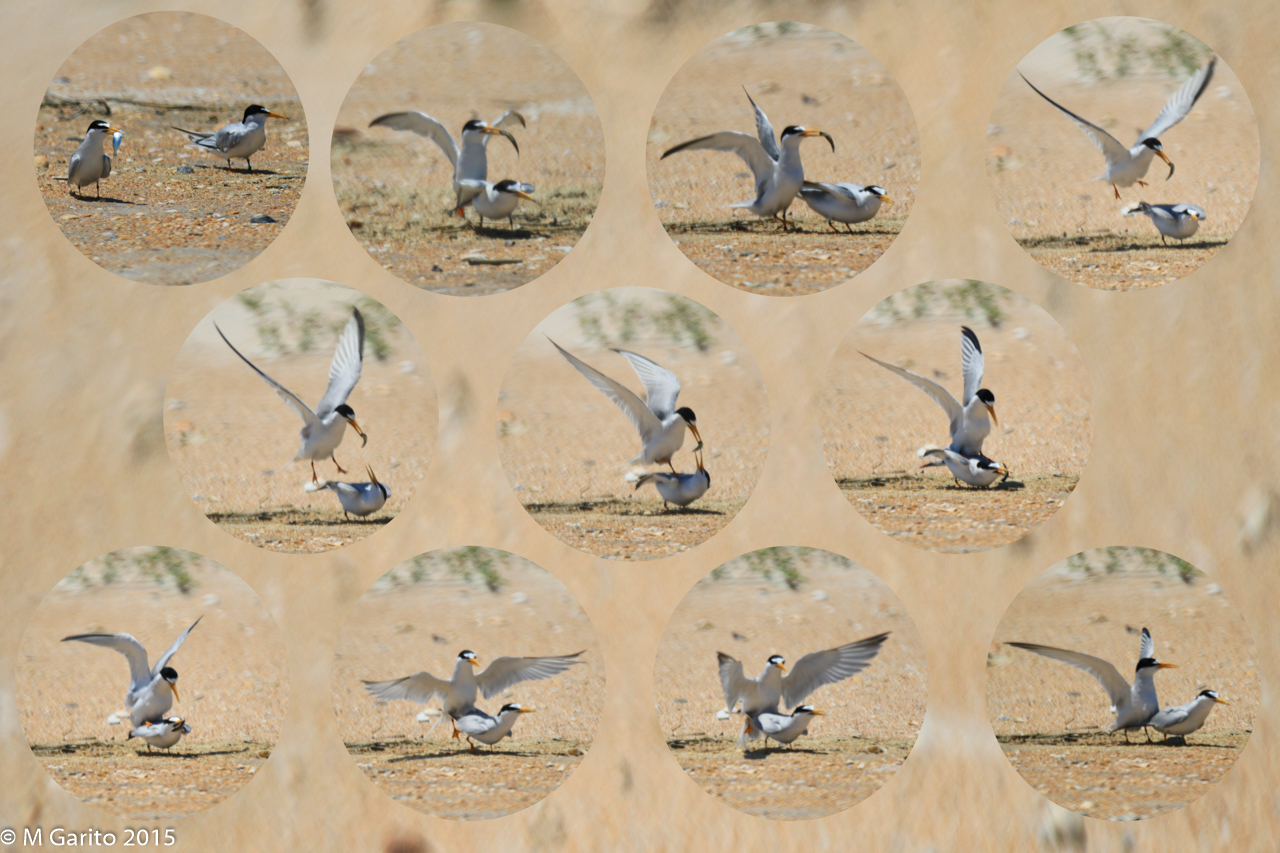
The mating sequence of a pair of least terns processed into one image (St. Augustine, Florida)

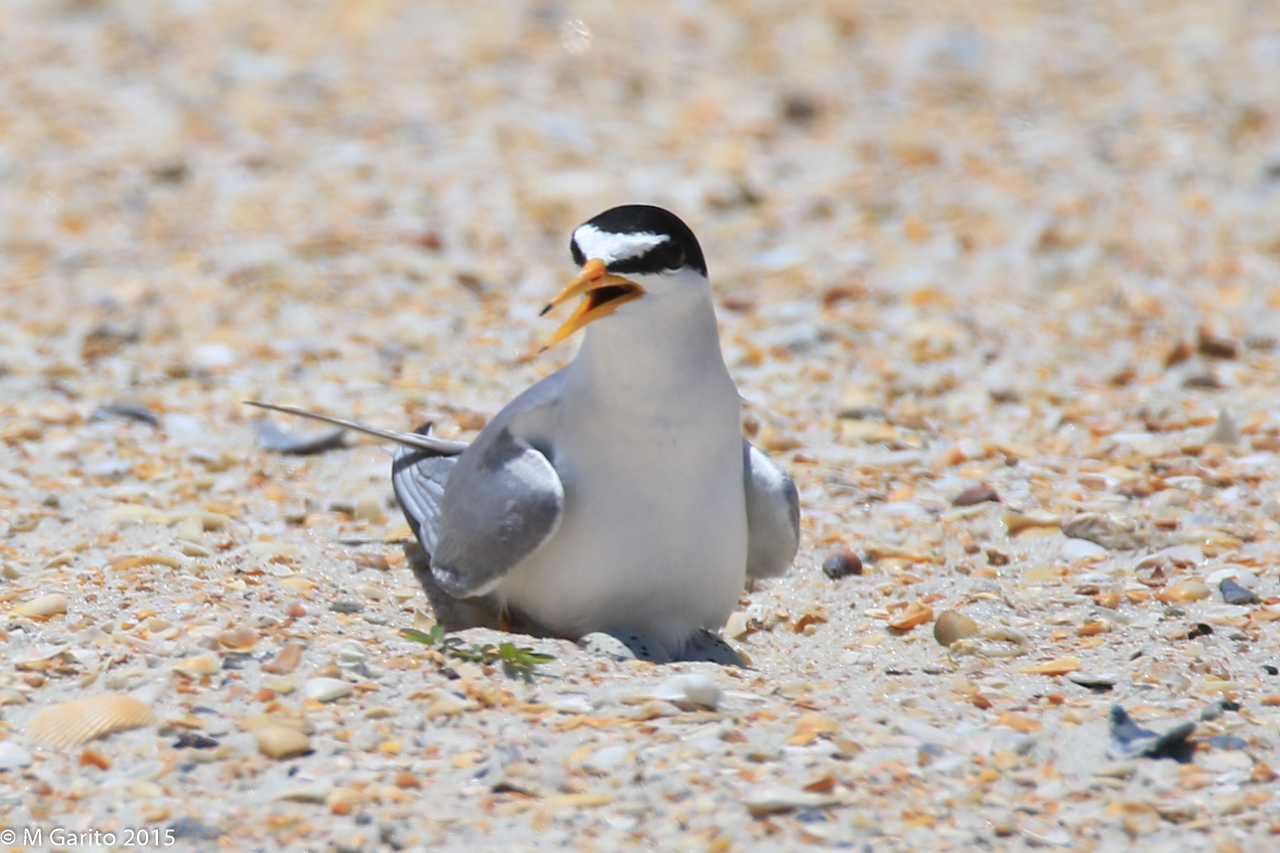
This least tern is on the nest. There are two eggs which can be seen if one looks closely.

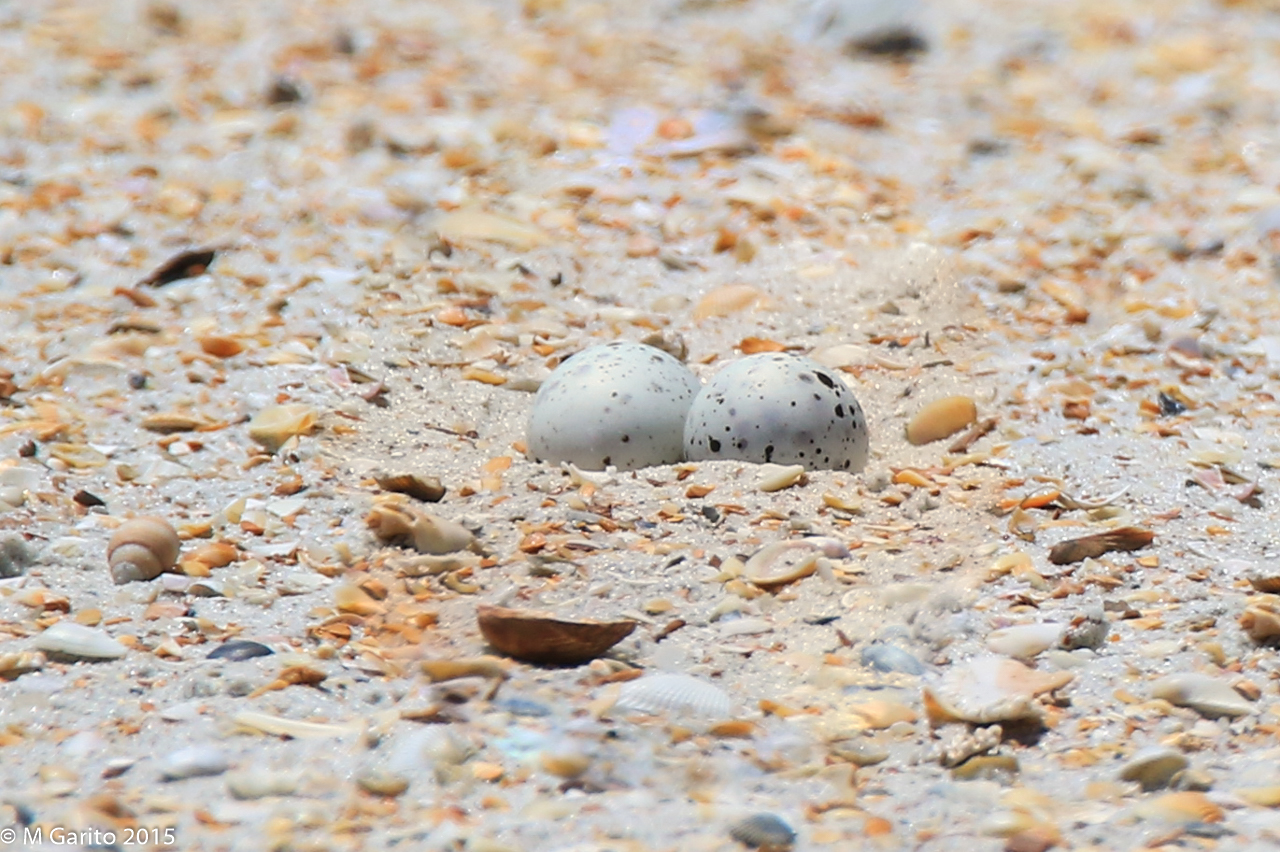
The eggs are speckled and generally blend well with the sandy surface.

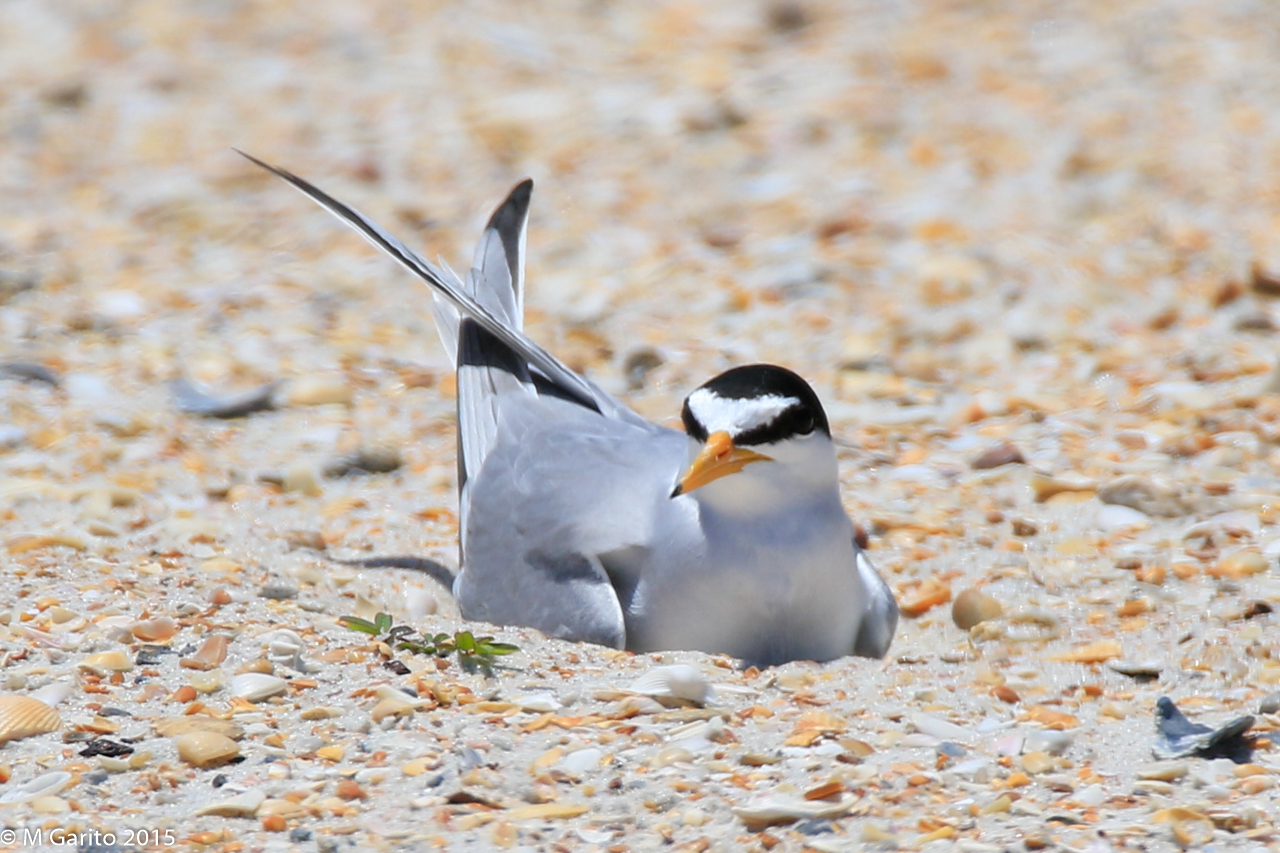
A least tern lying just below the surface of the sand is probably on its nest. The nests are very shallow and minimally scooped out.

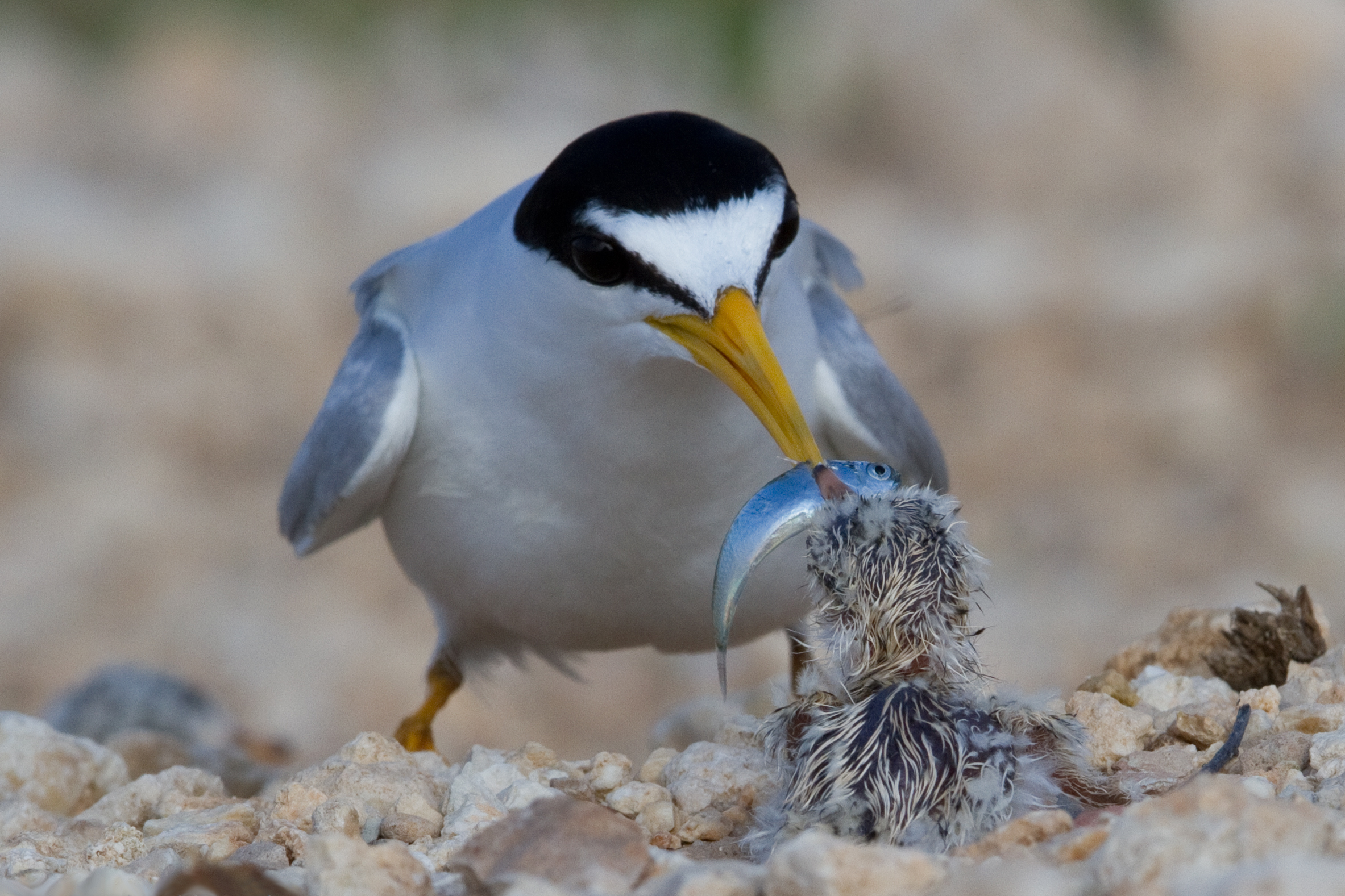
First fish feeding at Quintana, Texas

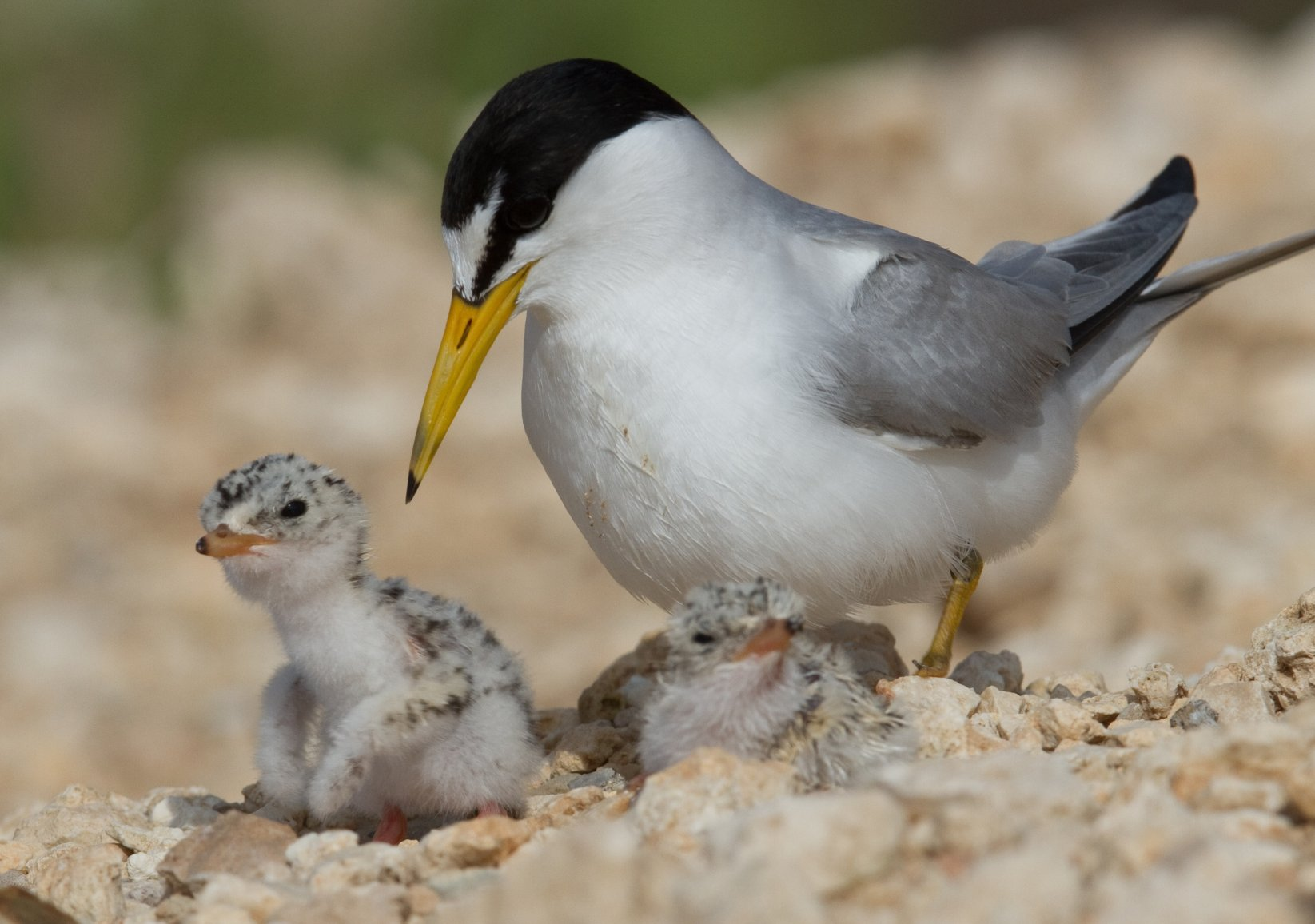
Two-day-old chicks

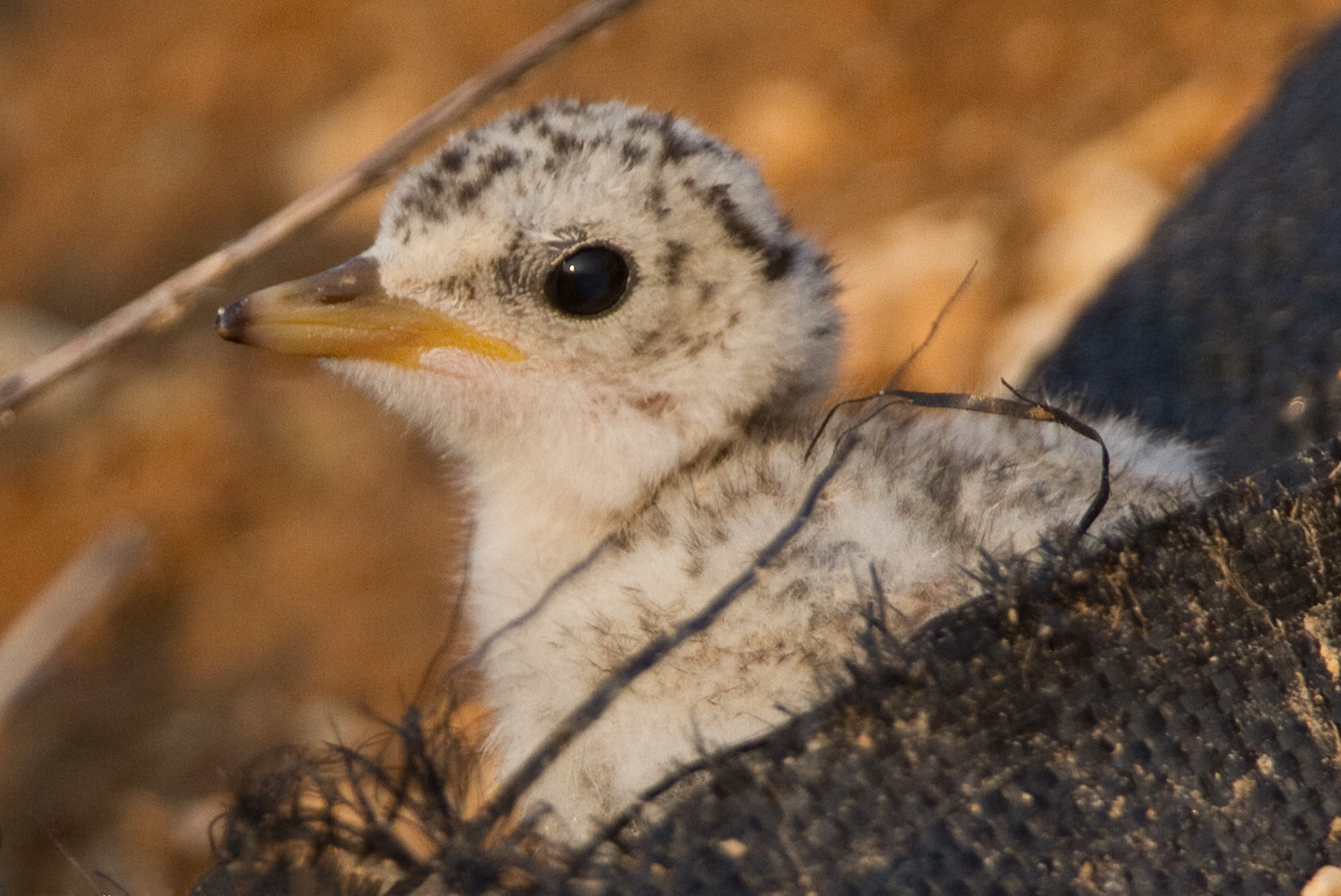
Seven-day-old chicks

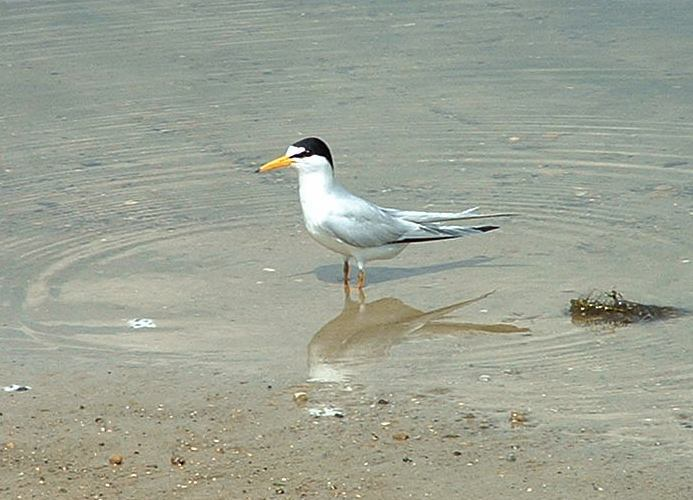
Least tern (S. a. antillarum) at Lake Jackson, Florida

== Feeding and roosting characteristics ==
The least tern hunts primarily in shallow estuaries and lagoons, where smaller fishes are abundant. It hovers until spotting prey, and then plunges into the water without full submersion to extract meal. The most common prey recently for both chicks and adults are silversides smelt (Atherinops spp.) and anchovy (Anchoa spp.) in southern California, as well as shiner perch, and small crustaceans elsewhere. Adults in southern California eat kelpfish (most likely giant kelpfish, Heterostichus rostratus). Insects are known to be eaten during El Niño events. In southern California, least terns feed in bays and lagoons, near shore, and more than 24 km (15 mi) from shore in the open ocean. Elsewhere, they feed in proximity to lagoons or bay mouths.

Adults do not require cover, so that they commonly roost and nest on the open ground. After young chicks are three days old, they are brooded less frequently by parents and require wind blocks and shade, and protection from predators. In some colonies in southern California, Spanish roof tiles are placed in colonies so chicks can hide there. Notable disruption of colonies can occur from predation by burrowing owls, gull-billed terns and American kestrels. Depredation by domestic cats has been observed in at least one colony. Predation on inland breeding terns by coyotes, bobcats, feral dogs and cats, great blue herons, Mississippi kites, and owls has also been documented.
