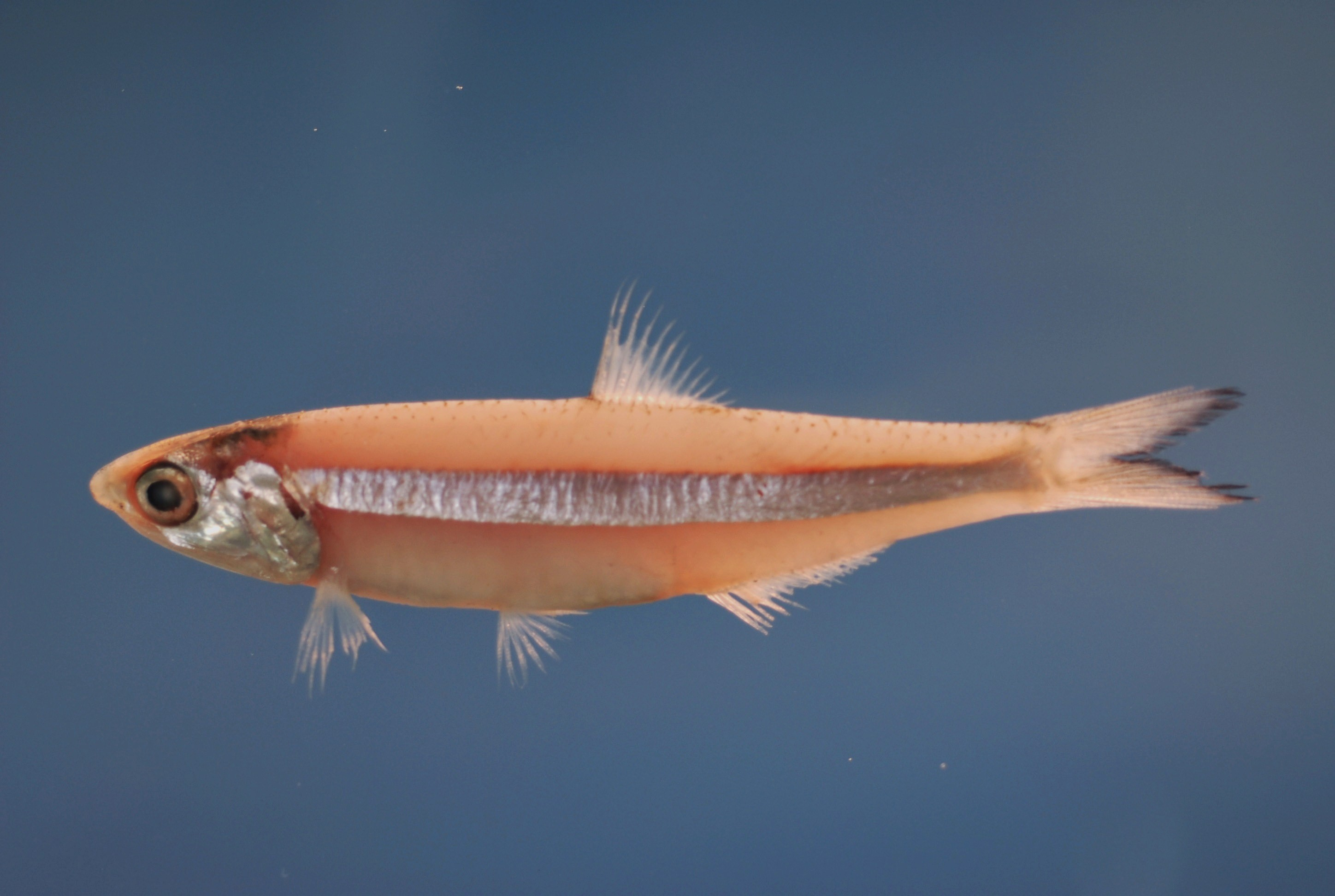

Conservation status
- Least Concern (IUCN 3.1)

Scientific classification
- Kingdom: Animalia
- Phylum: Chordata
- Class: Actinopterygii
- Order: Clupeiformes
- Family: Engraulidae
- Genus: Anchoa
- Species: A. lyolepis

Binomial name
- Anchoa lyolepis (Evermann & M. C. Marsh, 1900)

Synonyms
- Stolephorus lyolepis Evermann & M. C. Marsh, 1900; Anchoviella lyolepis (Evermann & M. C. Marsh, 1900); Anchovia platyargyrea Fowler, 1911; Anchoviella platyargyrea (Fowler, 1911); Engraulis platyargyreus (Fowler, 1911); Anchoa nasuta Hildebrand & J. de P. Carvalho, 1948

= Anchoa lyolepis =

Species of ray-finned fish

Anchoa lyolepis, the shortfinger anchovy, is a species of anchovy native to the western Atlantic Ocean from New York to Brazil. This species can reach a length of 12 centimetres (4.7 in) TL, though they usually do not exceed 9 centimetres (3.5 in) TL. This species is important to local subsistence fisheries and is commonly used as bait.
