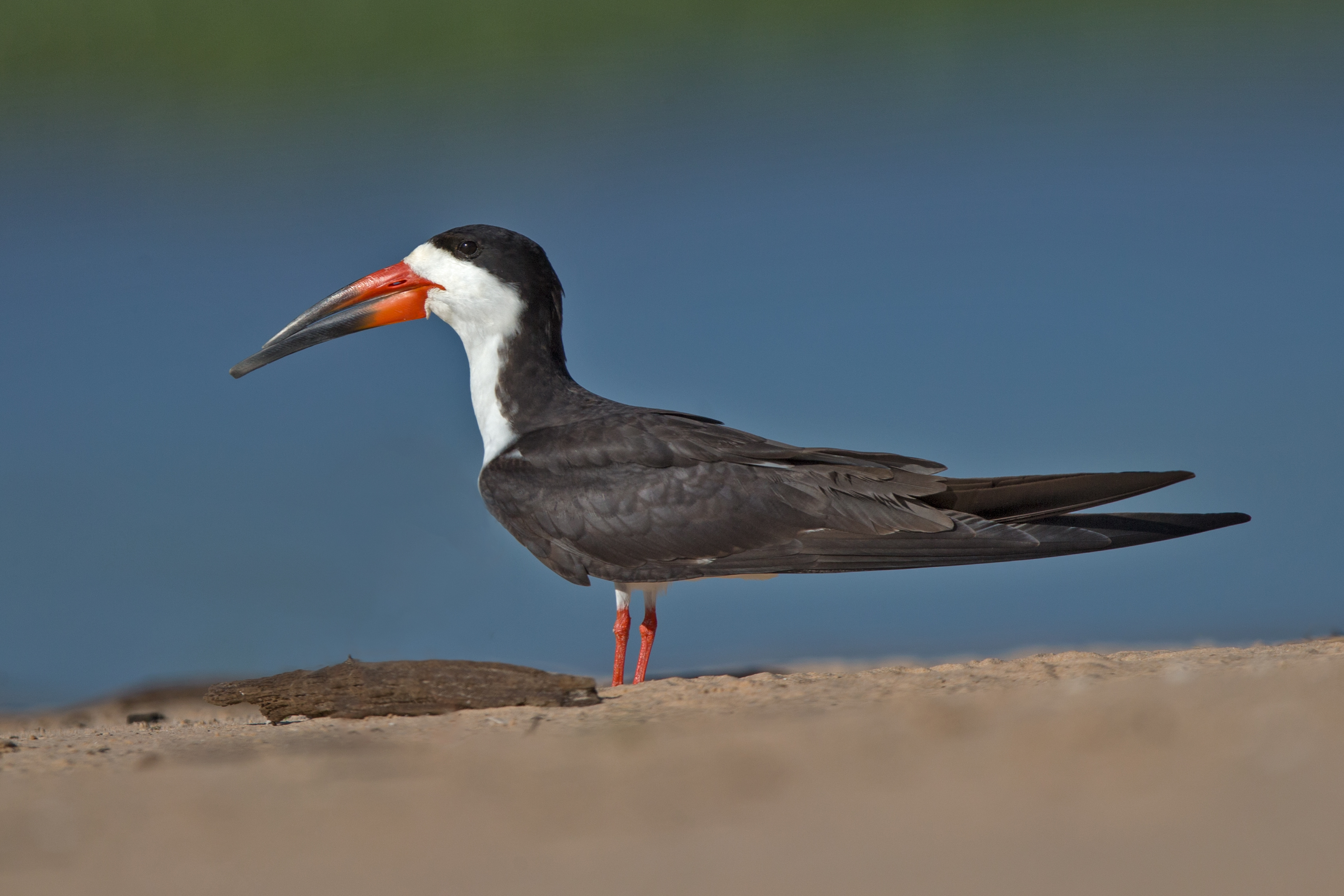
- Black skimmer in breeding plumage.

Conservation status
- Least Concern (IUCN 3.1)

Scientific classification
- Kingdom: Animalia
- Phylum: Chordata
- Class: Aves
- Order: Charadriiformes
- Family: Laridae
- Genus: Rynchops
- Species: R. niger

Binomial name
- Rynchops niger Linnaeus, 1758

Synonyms
- Rynchops fulva Linnaeus, 1758

= Black skimmer =

Species of bird

The black skimmer (Rynchops niger) is a tern-like seabird, one of three similar bird species in the skimmer genus Rynchops in the gull family Laridae. It breeds in North and South America. Northern populations winter in the warmer waters of the Caribbean and the tropical and subtropical Pacific and Atlantic coasts, but South American populations make only shorter movements in response to annual floods which extend their feeding areas in the river shallows.

== Taxonomy ==
The black skimmer was described by the Swedish naturalist Carl Linnaeus in 1755 in the tenth edition of his Systema Naturae and given the binomial name Rynchops niger. The genus name Rynchops is from the Ancient Greek ῥυvχος/rhunkhos meaning "bill" and κοπτω/koptō meaning "to cut off". The specific niger is the Latin word for "black". The black skimmer is one of three species in the genus Rynchops.

There are three subspecies:

Image	Subspecies	Description	Distribution
	R. n. niger (Linnaeus, 1758)		migratory, breeds on the Atlantic coast of North America, and from southern California to Ecuador in the Pacific
	R. n. cinerascens (von Spix, 1825)	is larger, has dusky underwings, only narrow white fringe to its black tail	breeds in northern and northeastern South America and the Amazon basin
	R. n. intercedens (Saunders, 1895)		occurs on the rest of the Atlantic coast of South America south to central Argentina

== Description ==
The black skimmer is the largest of the three skimmer species. It measures 40–50 cm (16–20 in) long with a 107–127 cm (42–50 in) wingspan. This species ranges from 212 to 447 g (7.5 to 15.8 oz), with males averaging about 349 g (12.3 oz), as compared to the smaller females 254 g (9.0 oz). The basal half of the bill is red, the rest mainly black, and the lower mandible is much-elongated. The eye has a dark brown iris and catlike vertical pupil, unique for a bird. The legs are red. The call is a barking kak-kak-kak.

Adults in breeding plumage have a black crown, nape and upper body. The forehead and underparts are white. The upper wings are black with white on the rear edge, and the tail and rump are dark grey with white edges. The underwing colour varies from white to dusky grey depending on region.

Non-breeding adults have paler and browner upperparts, and a white nape collar. Immature birds have brown upperparts with white feather tips and fringes. The underparts and forehead are white, and the underwings as the adult.

== Behaviour and ecology ==
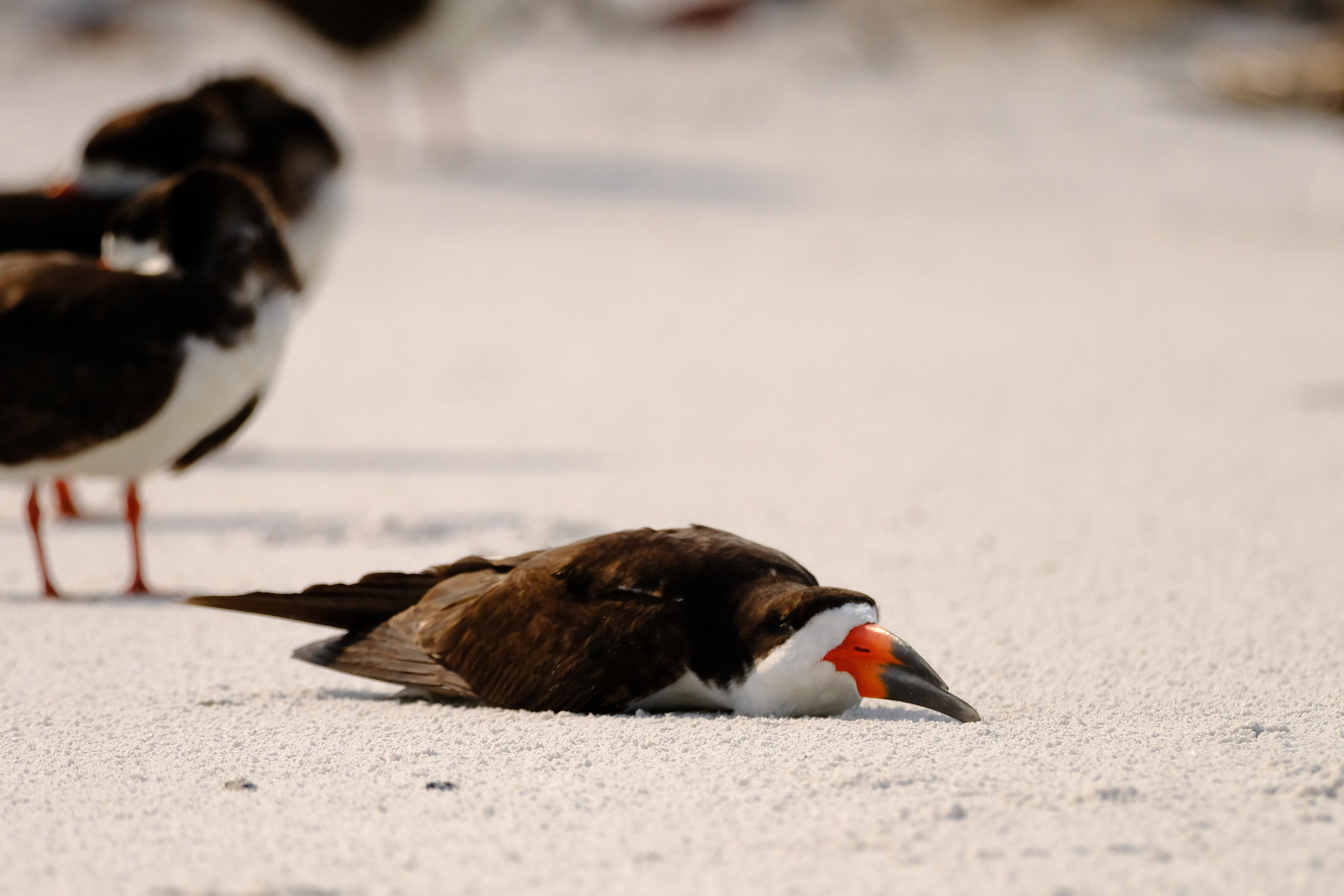
Black Skimmers often sleep flat on the ground with their beaks extended.

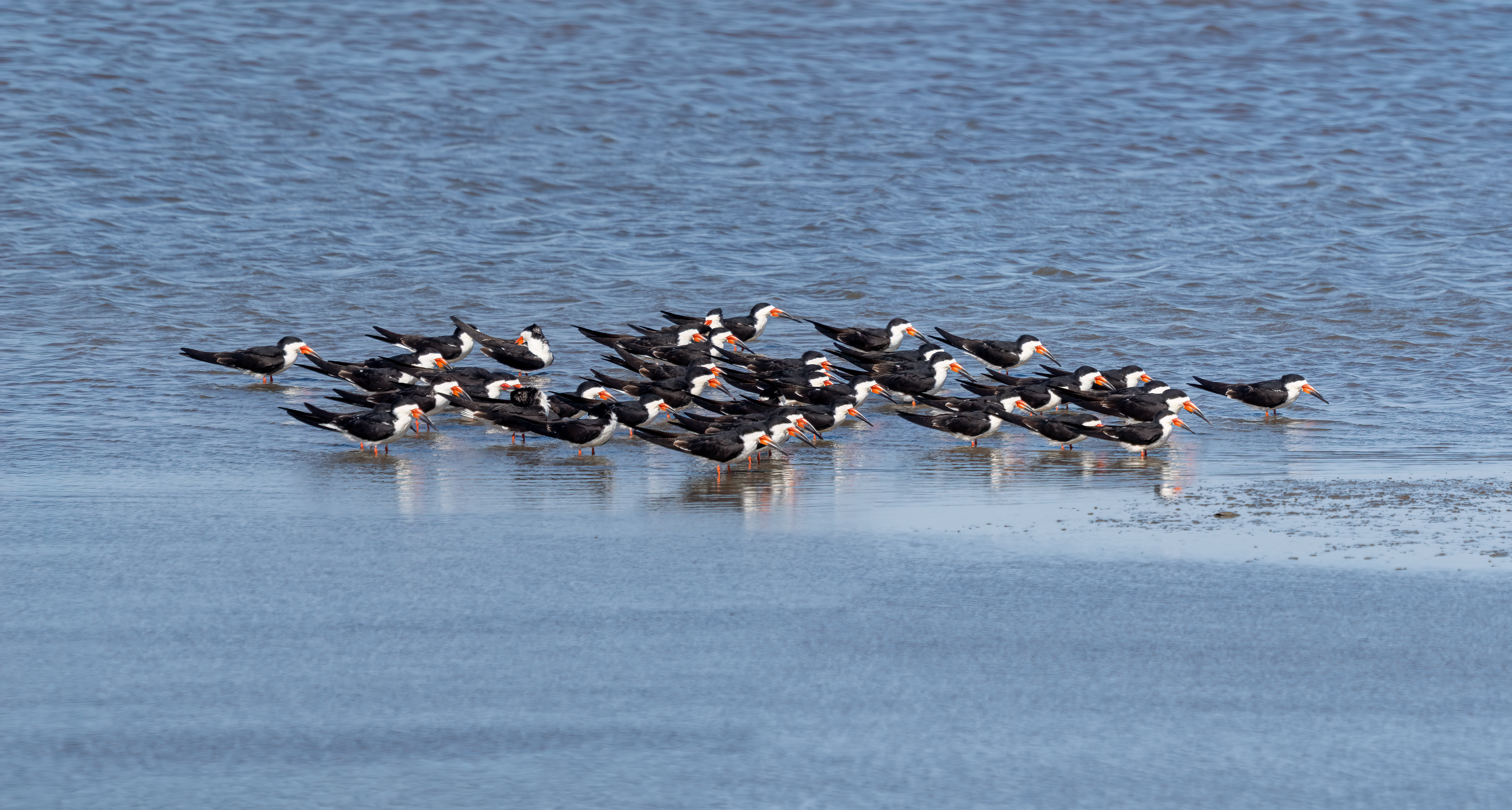
Flock in New Jersey

They spend much time loafing gregariously on sandbars in the rivers, coasts and lagoons they frequent.

=== Breeding ===
The black skimmer breeds in loose groups on sandbanks and sandy beaches in the Americas, the three to seven heavily dark-blotched buff or bluish eggs being incubated by both the male and female. The chicks leave the nest as soon as they hatch and lie inconspicuously in the nest depression or "scrape" where they are shaded from high temperatures by the parents. They may dig their own depressions in the sand at times. Parents feed the young almost exclusively during the day with almost no feeding occurring at night, due to the entire population of adults sometimes departing the colony to forage. Although the mandibles are of equal length at hatching, they rapidly become unequal during fledging.

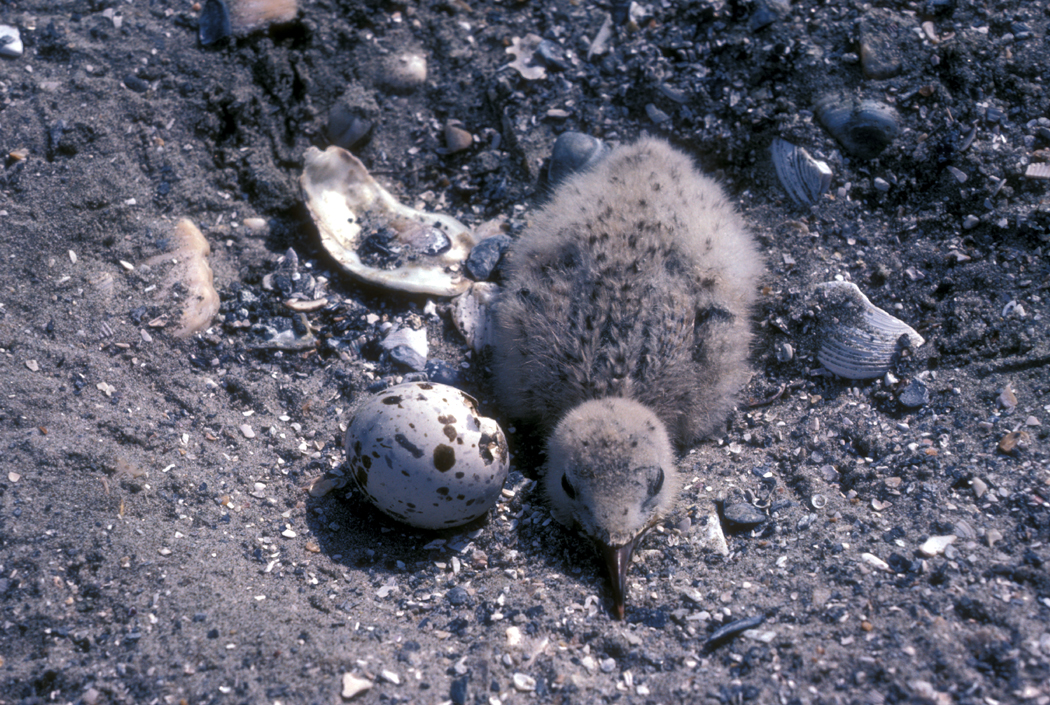
Chick and egg

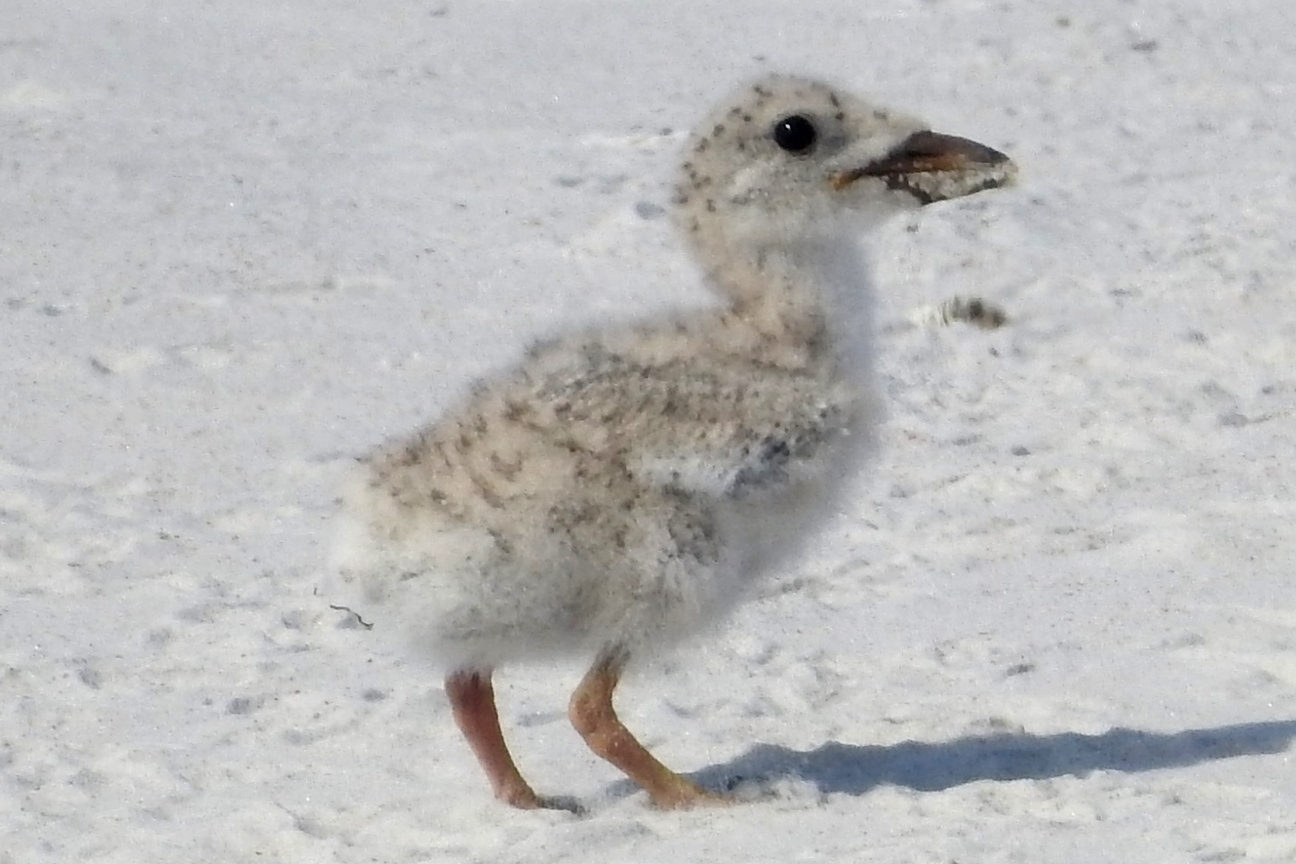
Chick

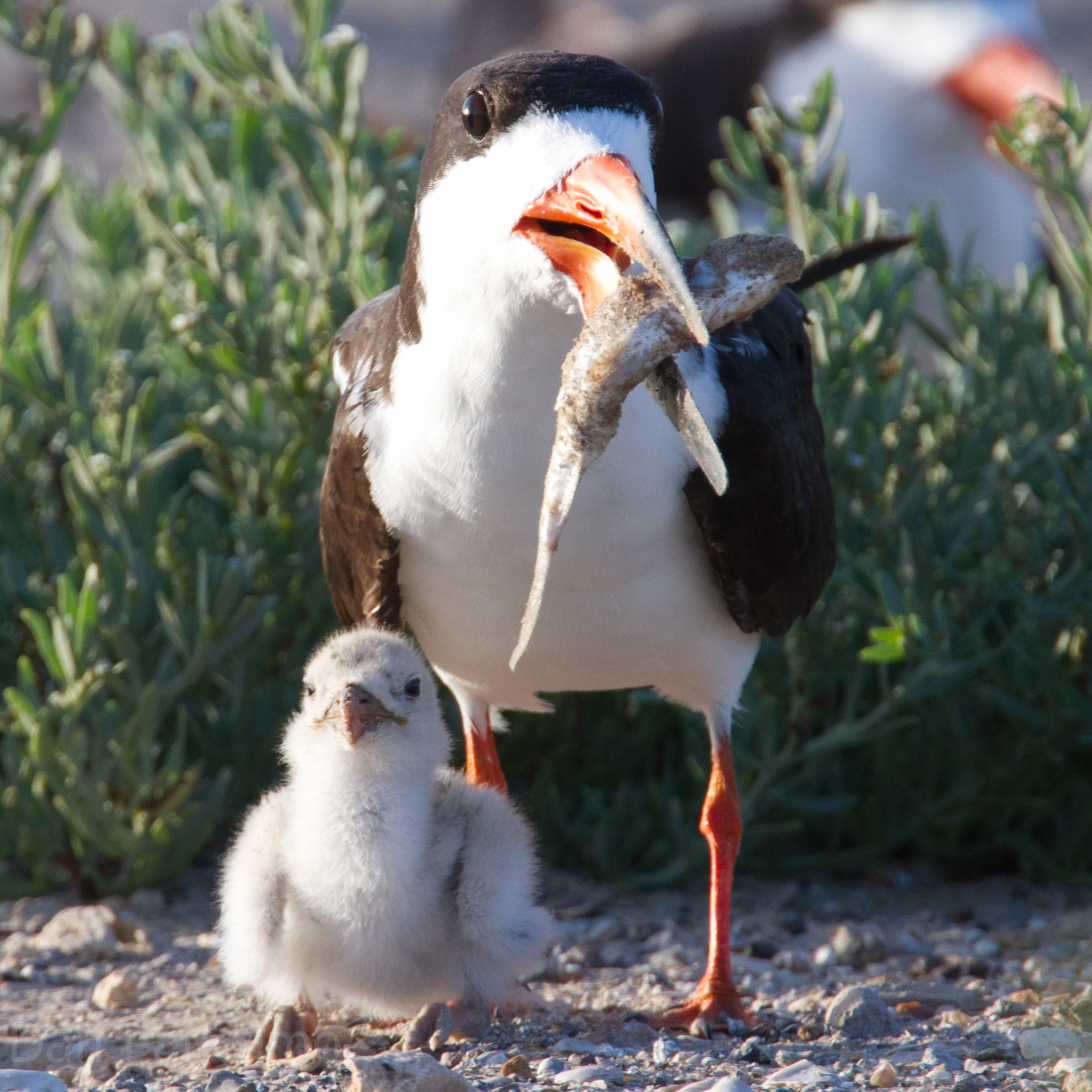
Adult feeding a chick

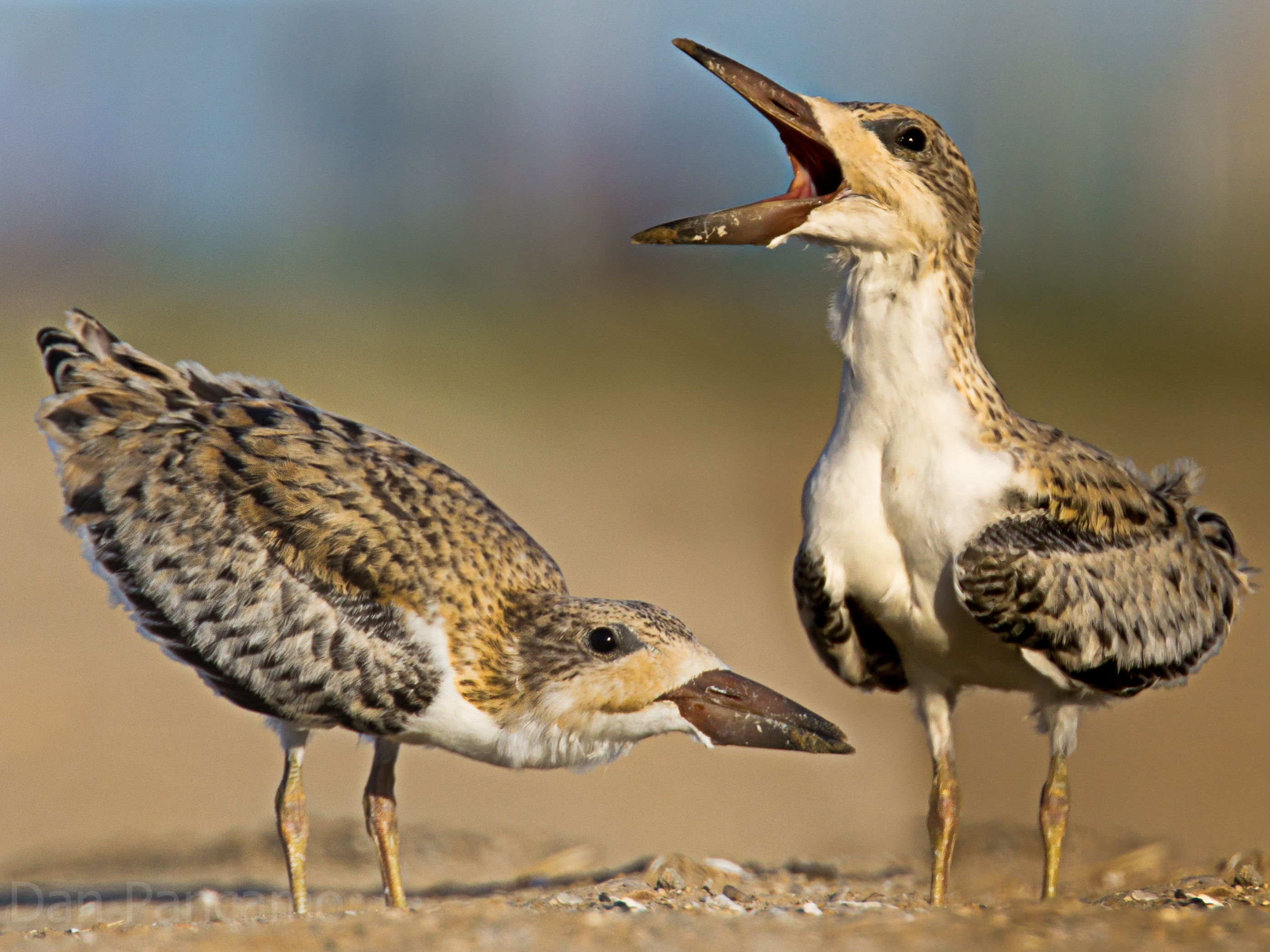
Juveniles at four weeks. They are distinguished from adults by the white speckled pattern on their wings and body.

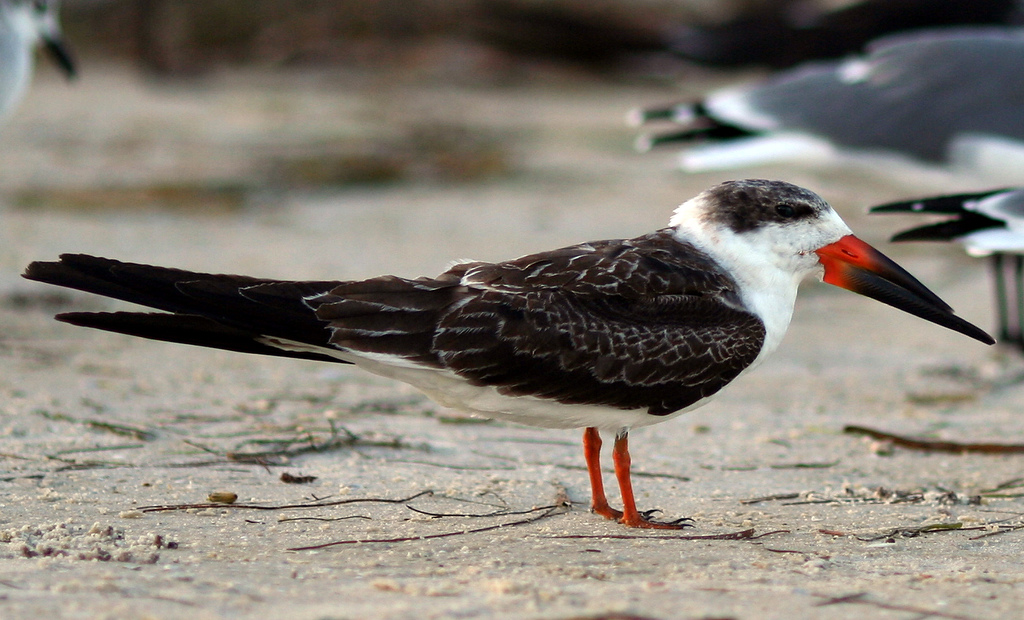
Adult winter plumage

=== Feeding ===
Skimmers have a light graceful flight, with steady beats of their long wings. They usually feed in large flocks, flying low over the water surface with the lower mandible skimming the water for (in order of importance) small fish, insects, crustaceans and molluscs caught by touch by day or especially at night. Fish prey species include Odontesthes argentinenesis, Brevoortia aurea, Anchoa marinii, Lycengraulis grossidens, Engraulis anchoita, Pomatomus saltatrix, Mugil cephalus, Fundulus heteroclitus, Anchoa mitchilli and Odontesthes incisa.

Female skimmers are more likely to be involved in caring for and feeding their chicks, though male skimmers have been observed feeding larger prey to their older chicks. The survival of black skimmer chicks is highly dependent on the availability and quality of adequately sized prey closely located to the nest site. The youngest chicks (under six days old) are fed as often as twelve times per day, with the oldest chicks (over twelve days old) being fed at least once per day. They primarily feed during low light levels at night, but have been observed to forage in the daytime in preparation for nighttime feeding.

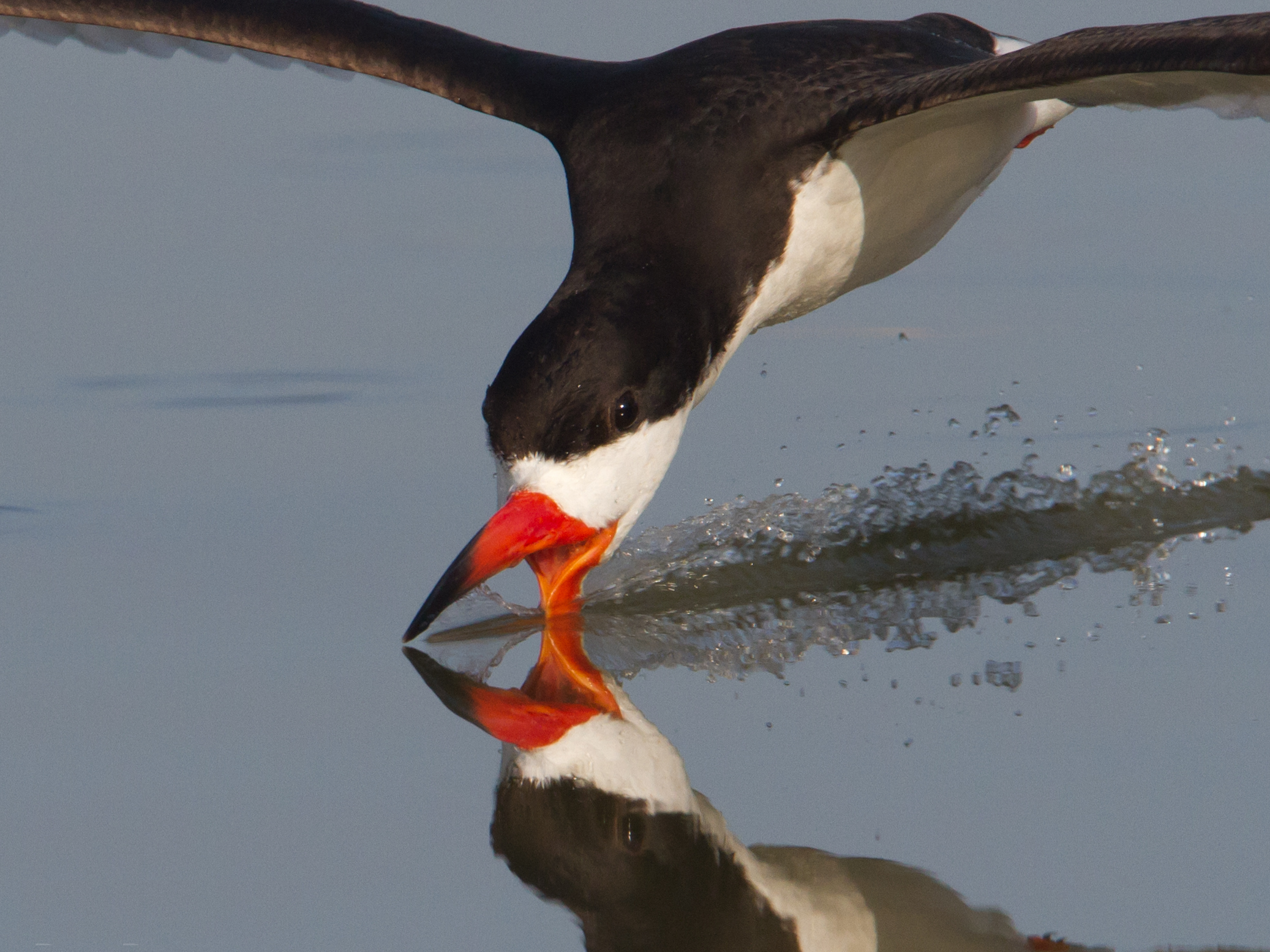
R. n. niger fishing, Texas

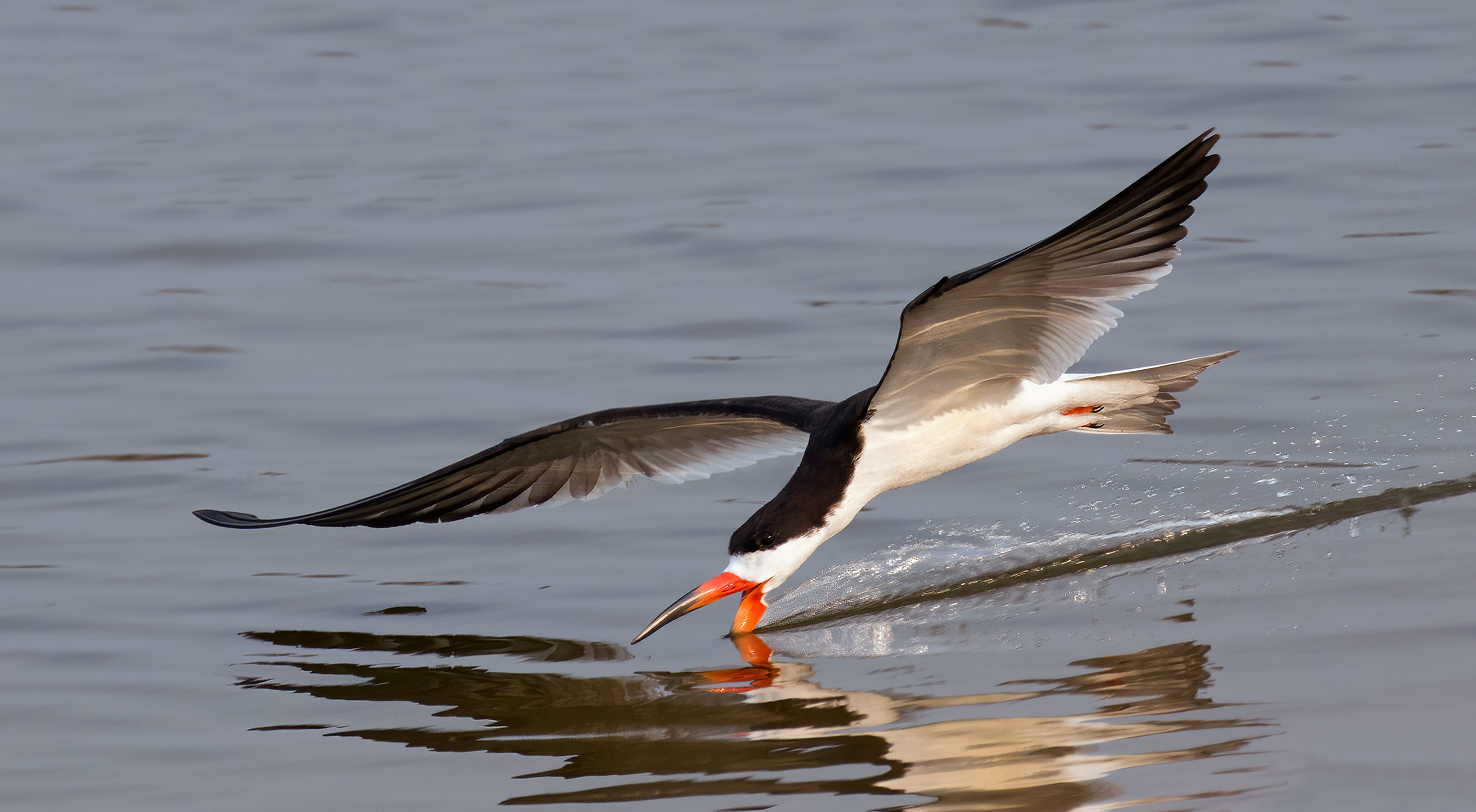
R. n. intercedens fishing, Brazil

With a fish

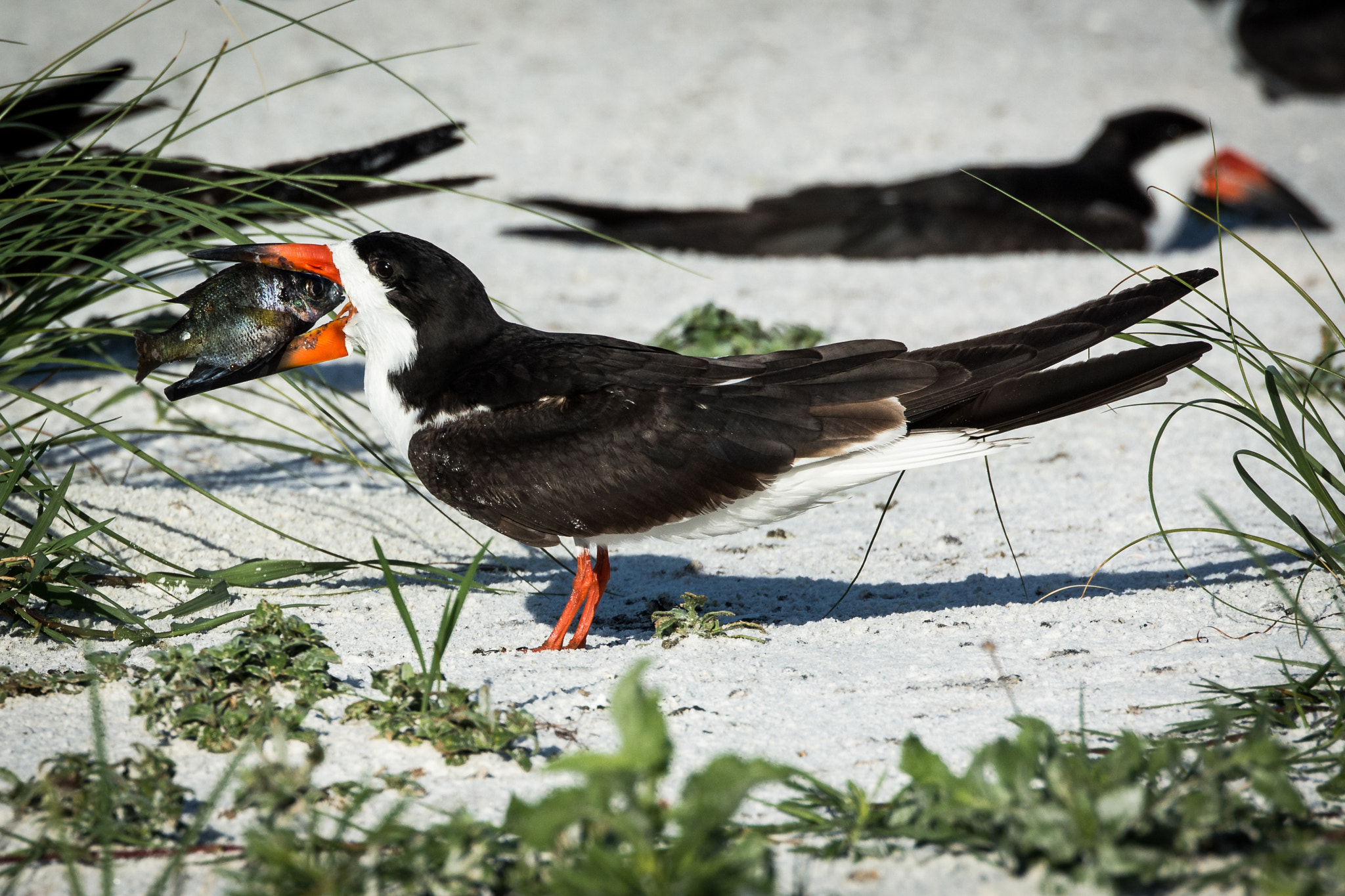
Eating a fish
