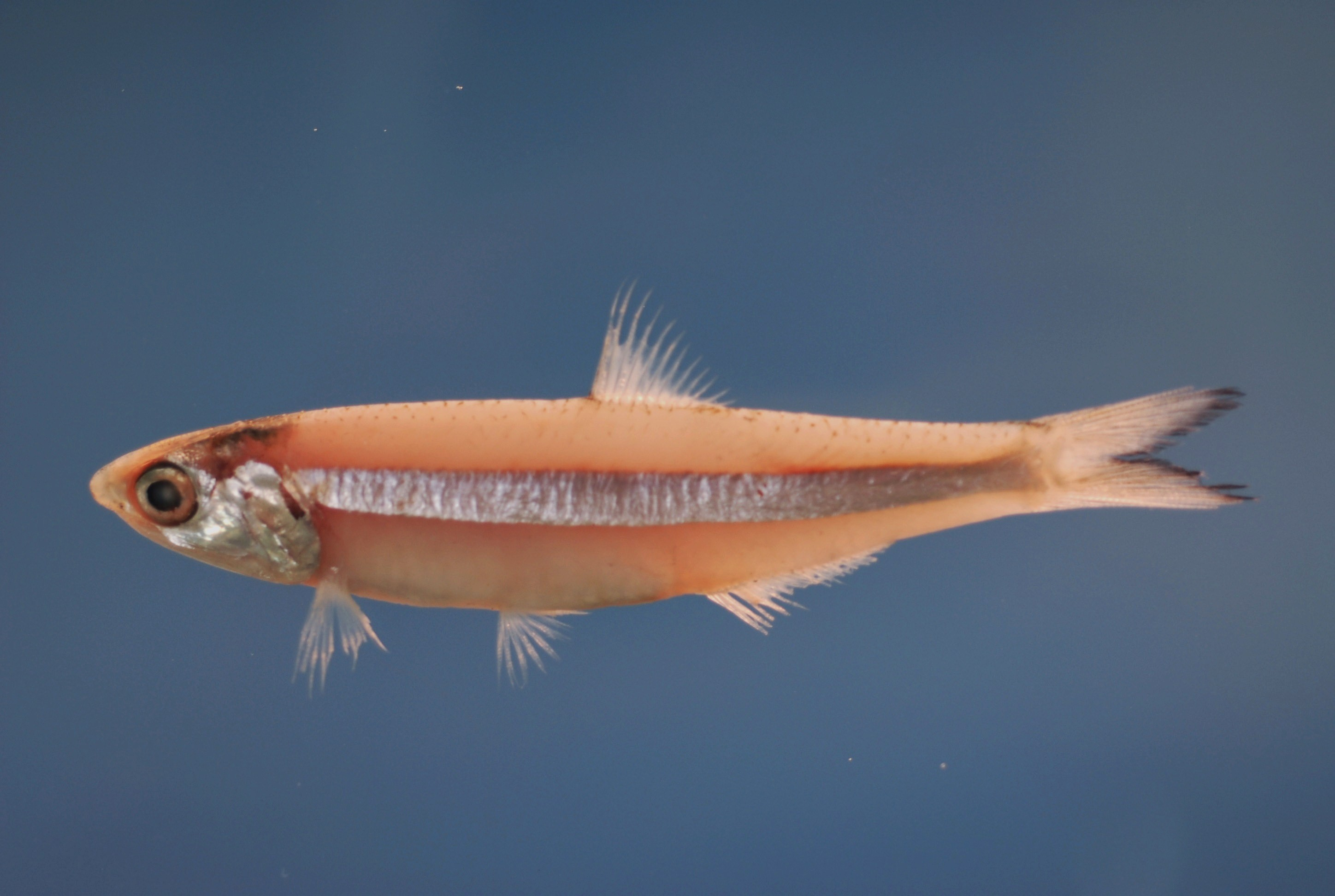
- Anchoa lyolepis

Scientific classification
- Kingdom: Animalia
- Phylum: Chordata
- Class: Actinopterygii
- Order: Clupeiformes
- Family: Engraulidae
- Subfamily: Engraulinae
- Genus: Anchoa; D. S. Jordan & Evermann, 1927

Type species
- Engraulis compressus Girard, 1858

= Anchoa =

Genus of ray-finned fishes

Anchoa is a genus of ray-finned fishes in the family Engraulidae. It currently consists of 35 species.

== Species ==
There are currently 35 recognized species in this genus:

- Anchoa analis (R. R. Miller, 1945) (Longfin Pacific anchovy)
- Anchoa argentivittata (Regan, 1904) (Regan's anchovy)
- Anchoa belizensis (Thomerson & D. W. Greenfield, 1975) (Belize anchovy)
- Anchoa cayorum (Fowler, 1906) (Key anchovy)
- Anchoa chamensis Hildebrand, 1943 (Chame Point anchovy)
- Anchoa choerostoma (Goode, 1874) (Bermuda anchovy)
- Anchoa colonensis Hildebrand, 1943 (Narrow-striped anchovy)
- Anchoa compressa (Girard, 1858) (Deep-body anchovy)
- Anchoa cubana (Poey, 1868) (Cuban anchovy)
- Anchoa curta (D. S. Jordan & C. H. Gilbert, 1882) (Short anchovy)
- Anchoa delicatissima (Girard, 1854) (Slough anchovy)
- Anchoa eigenmannia (Meek & Hildebrand, 1923) (Eigenmann's anchovy)
- Anchoa exigua (D. S. Jordan & C. H. Gilbert, 1882) (Slender anchovy)
- Anchoa filifera (Fowler, 1915) (Longfinger anchovy)
- Anchoa helleri (C. L. Hubbs, 1921) (Heller's anchovy)
- Anchoa hepsetus (Linnaeus, 1758) (Broad-striped anchovy)
- Anchoa ischana (D. S. Jordan & C. H. Gilbert, 1882) (Sharpnose anchovy)
- Anchoa januaria (Steindachner, 1879) (Rio anchovy)
- Anchoa lamprotaenia Hildebrand, 1943 (Big-eye anchovy)
- Anchoa lucida (D. S. Jordan & Gilbert, 1882) (Bright anchovy)
- Anchoa lyolepis (Evermann & M. C. Marsh, 1900) (Shortfinger anchovy)
- Anchoa marinii Hildebrand, 1943 (Marini's anchovy)
- Anchoa mitchilli (Valenciennes, 1848) (Bay anchovy)
- Anchoa mundeola (C. H. Gilbert & Pierson, 1898) (False Panama anchovy)
- Anchoa mundeoloides (Breder, 1928) (Northern Gulf anchovy)
- Anchoa nasus (Kner & Steindachner, 1867) (Longnose anchovy)
- Anchoa panamensis (Steindachner, 1877) (Panama anchovy)
- Anchoa parva (Meek & Hildebrand, 1923) (Little anchovy)
- Anchoa pectoralis Hildebrand, 1943 (Bigfin anchovy)
- Anchoa scofieldi (D. S. Jordan & Culver, 1895) (Scofield's anchovy)
- Anchoa spinifer (Valenciennes, 1848) (Spicule anchovy)
- Anchoa starksi (C. H. Gilbert & Pierson, 1898) (Starks' anchovy)
- Anchoa tricolor (Spix & Agassiz, 1829) (Piquitinga anchovy)
- Anchoa trinitatis (Fowler, 1915) (Trinidad anchovy)
- Anchoa walkeri W. J. Baldwin & Chang, 1970 (Walker's anchovy)

== Description ==
Anchoa are small, silvery fish that range anywhere from 5.8–24 centimetres (2.3–9.4 in). The smallest of these species is the Anchoa belizensis and the largest is Anchoa spinifer. These fish are distributed throughout the mediterranean sea and Americas, mostly in the Pacific and the Atlantic Ocean.
