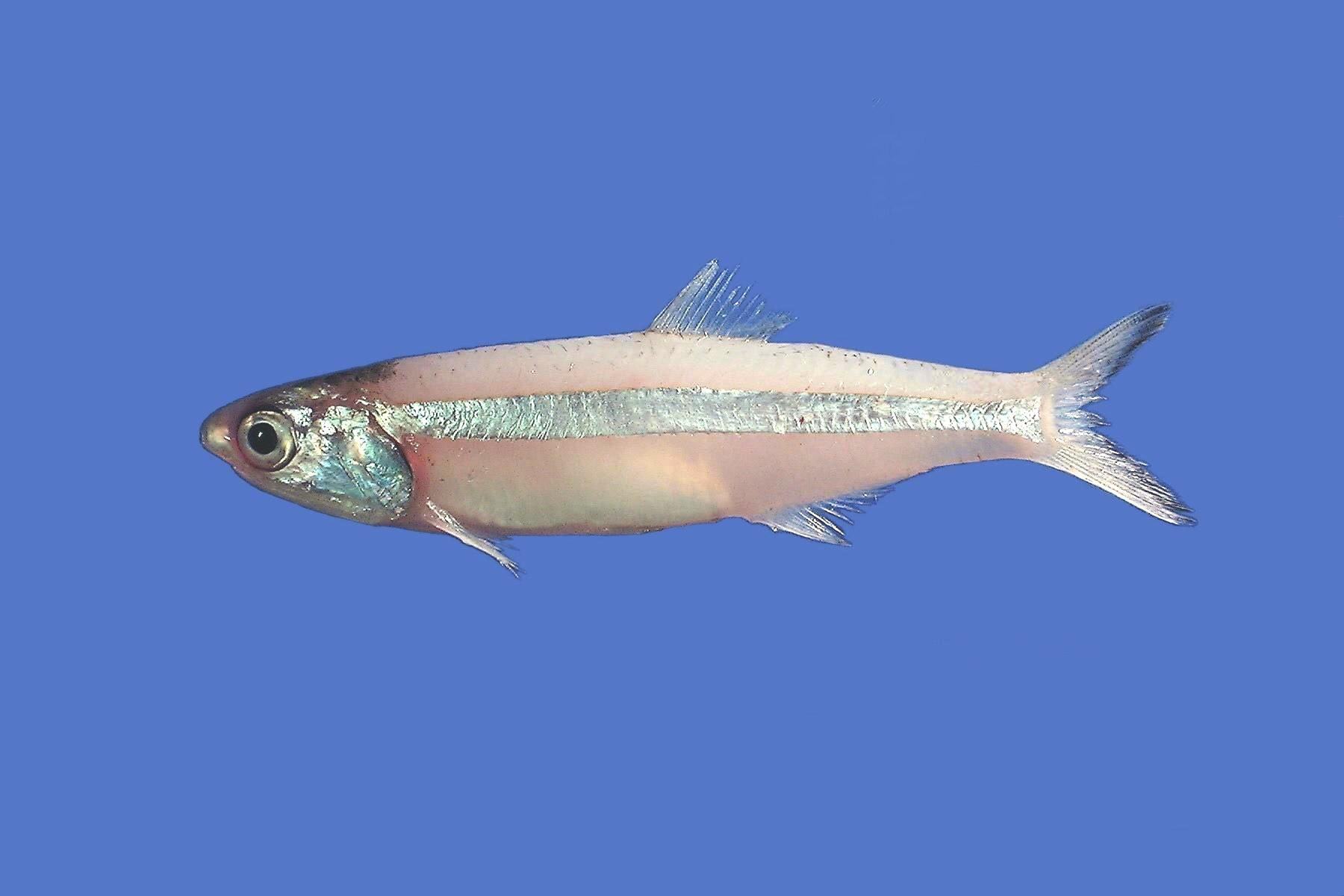

Conservation status
- Least Concern (IUCN 3.1)

Scientific classification
- Kingdom: Animalia
- Phylum: Chordata
- Class: Actinopterygii
- Division: Teleostei
- Order: Clupeiformes
- Family: Engraulidae
- Genus: Anchoa
- Species: A. hepsetus

Binomial name
- Anchoa hepsetus (Linnaeus, 1758)

= Anchoa hepsetus =

Species of ray-finned fish

Anchoa hepsetus, commonly known as the broad-striped anchovy, is a species of ray-finned fish in the family Engraulidae. It grows to be about 15 cm (6 in) long. The broad-striped anchovy is found in the west Atlantic along the North American coast from Nova Scotia and the Maine coast scarcely, and abundantly from the Chesapeake bay to the West Indies and Uruguay. It is found most commonly in shoals along coastal waters, as deep as 73 m (40 fathoms) although mostly found in water shallower than this. The broad-striped anchovy spawns in spring. Their eggs are pelagic and hatch within 48 hours at regular spring temperatures. At young ages, it eats copepods, but as the fish ages, its diet begins to consist of other small crustaceans, molluscs, and worm larvae. It is an important food staple for large commercial fishes, such as the American seatrout. It is commonly eaten by birds. It is elongate with large eyes and protuberant snout, large mouth and underslung jaw. Its anal fin is quite short, and its front fin lies beneath the end of the dorsal fin. It is grey-green with black dots, but its notable feature is its silvery stripe from head to tail.
