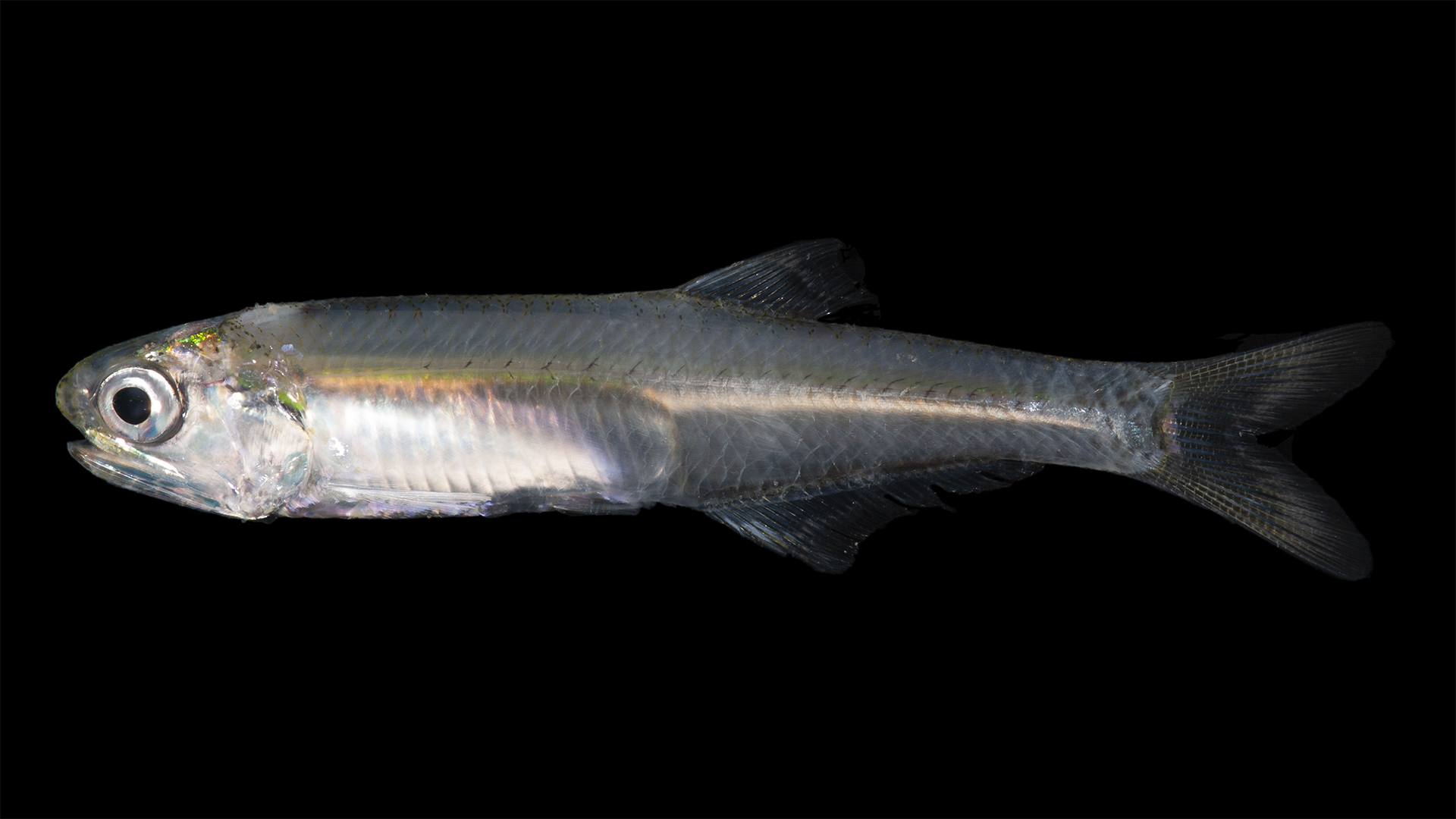

Conservation status
- Least Concern (IUCN 3.1)

Scientific classification
- Kingdom: Animalia
- Phylum: Chordata
- Class: Actinopterygii
- Order: Clupeiformes
- Family: Engraulidae
- Genus: Anchoa
- Species: A. mitchilli

Binomial name
- Anchoa mitchilli (Valenciennes, 1848)

Synonyms
- Engraulis mitchilli Valenciennes, 1848; Engraulis louisiana Lesueur, 1848; Anchoa mitchilli diaphana Hildebrand, 1943

= Anchoa mitchilli =

Species of ray-finned fish

Anchoa mitchilli is a species of ray-finned fish in the family Engraulidae, the anchovies. Its common names include bay anchovy and common anchovy. It is native to the western Atlantic Ocean and the Gulf of Mexico. It is one of the most common fish species along the coastlines of the western Atlantic.

== Etymology ==
The fish is named in honor of Samuel Latham Mitchill (1764–1831), naturalist, physician and U.S. Senator, who studied the fishes of New York.

== Description ==
The bay anchovy is somewhat variable in appearance. It is a small, slender, schooling fish with a greenish body and a silvery stripe. It is characterized by its very long jaw, silvery belly, lateral stripe, and single dorsal fin. The dorsal fin is located directly above the anal fin origin. The adult male is generally about 6 centimetres (2.4 in) long, with a maximum length of 10 centimetres (3.9 in) to 11 centimetres (4.3 in). It has 14 to 16 rays in its dorsal fin, 24 to 30 in its anal fin, and 11 to 12 in the pectoral. It may live more than three years.

The bay anchovy is similar to other species in the genus Anchoa which occur in the same regions. The broad-striped anchovy is similar in appearance, but grows to a larger size, up to 15 centimetres (5.9 in). The Cuban anchovy has its anal fin set further back on the body.

== Range and habitat ==
This species is distributed in the Atlantic Ocean and Gulf of Mexico along the eastern coasts of North America from Maine to Yucatán. It does not occur in the West Indies. It is well known in the Chesapeake Bay, where it is the most abundant fish.

It occurs in a wide range of water temperatures and salinities, including some hypersaline environments. It does not tolerate low-oxygen waters and easily asphyxiates when deprived of oxygen.

This fish spends most of its time cruising the water column. It can also be found over bare substrates at the ocean floor and in tide pools and surf zones. It can live in muddy, brackish waters. It rarely enters waters deeper than 25 metres (80 ft).

== Biology and ecology ==
This fish feeds on zooplankton, including copepods, mysids, and crab larvae.

It is in turn an important prey item for a variety of larger fish, including weakfish (Cynoscion regalis), striped bass (Morone saxatilis), chain pickerel (Esox niger), and bluefish (Pomatomus saltatrix). Birds such as royal terns (Thalasseus maximus) and Sandwich terns (T. sandvicensis) feed on it.

This species is an important link in the food web in many ecosystems. It is a major pathway by which zooplankton biomass is converted to the biomass of larger fish.

The bay anchovy is sexually mature when it reaches about 4 centimeters in length. It spawns in the water column in shallow and deeper waters. In the southern part of its range it spawns year-round, and further north it breeds during the warmer months. A female can spawn 50 times in one season, producing over 1,000 eggs each time. Eggs hatch in 24 hours. Larvae mature in about 45 days. Their growth rates are variable and may depend on the availability of food.

== Human uses ==
This species is made into anchovy paste and is used as a bait fish. It is harvested as a rough fish and used for fish oil and fish paste.

== Conservation ==
This fish is not of conservation concern. It has an extensive range, a large and stable population made up of many subpopulations, and no major threats.

== Subspecies ==
There are no current subspecies of Anchoa mitchilli, although Anchoa mitchilli diaphana is a subspecies proposed by Samuel F. Hildebrand in 1943. The subspecies is currently unaccepted by World Register of Marine Species (WoRMS). Hildebrand characterized the subspecies by its deeper and more compressed body and fewer gill rakers compared to its accepted counterpart. It has a proposed range of South Carolina, United States through Yucatán, Mexico. In proposing Anchoa mitchilli diaphana as a subspecies, Hildebrand made the distinction by proposing Anchoa mitchilli mitchilli, what is considered to be Anchoa mitchilli today.
