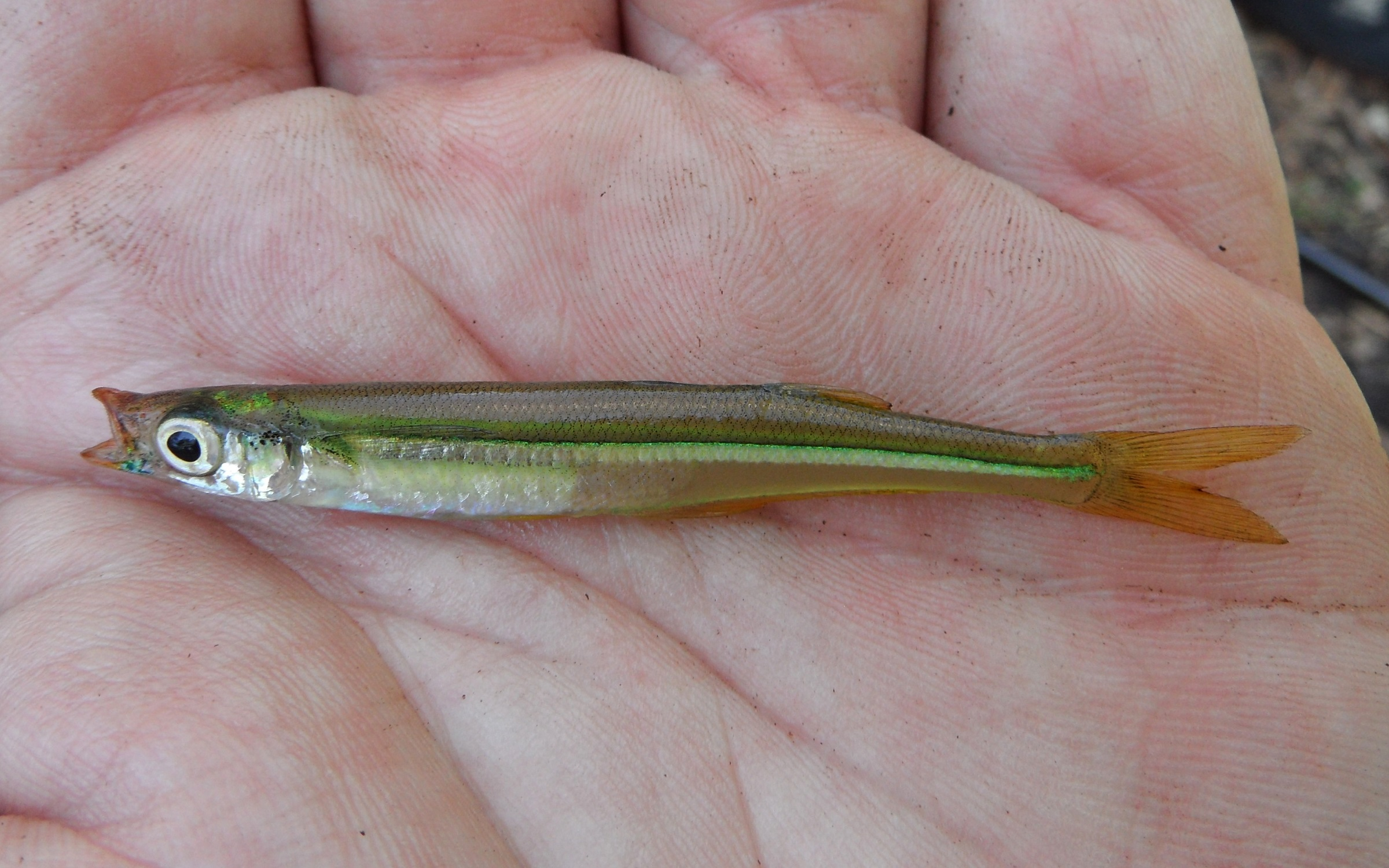

Scientific classification
- Kingdom: Animalia
- Phylum: Chordata
- Class: Actinopterygii
- Division: Teleostei
- Order: Atheriniformes
- Family: Atherinopsidae
- Genus: Labidesthes
- Species: L. vanhyningi

Binomial name
- Labidesthes vanhyningi B. A. Bean & Reid, 1930

Synonyms
- Labidesthes sicculus subsp. vanhyningi Bean & Reid, 1930

= Labidesthes vanhyningi =

Species of fish

Labidesthes vanhyningi, the golden silverside, is a species of Neotropical silverside from North America. This is a pelagic and neritic freshwater fish which is found in river systems draining into the Gulf of Mexico from the Neches River to southern Florida. It was described by Barton A. Bean and Earl D. Reid in 1930 from a type locality of Prairie Creek, 6 miles east of Gainesville, Florida and named in honour of the collector of the type, herpetologist Oather C. Van Hyning, the son of Thompson H. Van Hyning who was the first director of the Florida Museum of Natural History.
