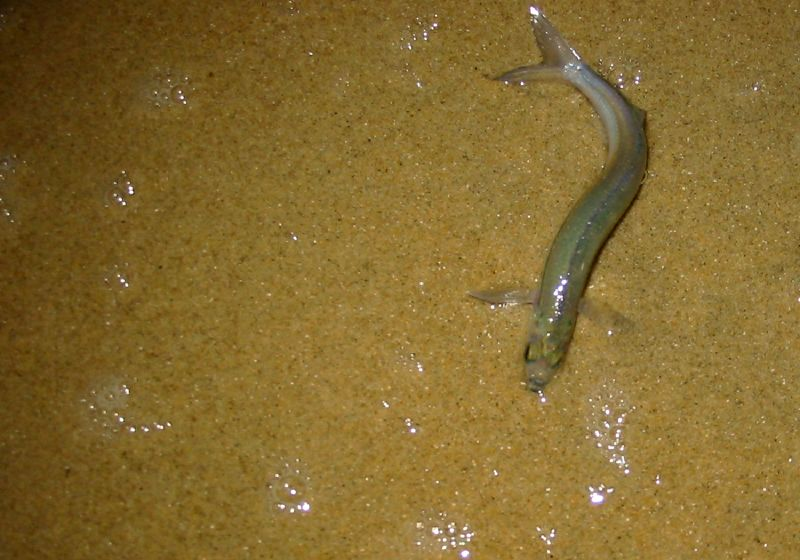
- California grunion, Leuresthes tenuis

Scientific classification
- Kingdom: Animalia
- Phylum: Chordata
- Class: Actinopterygii
- Division: Teleostei
- Order: Atheriniformes
- Family: Atherinopsidae
- Subfamily: Atherinopsinae
- Tribe: Atherinopsini
- Genus: Leuresthes; D. S. Jordan & C. H. Gilbert, 1880

Type species
- Atherinopsis tenuis Ayres, 1860

= Grunion =

Grunion Temporal range: Pleistocene to Present

Common name for several species of fish

Grunion are two fish species of the genus Leuresthes: the California grunion, L. tenuis, and the Gulf grunion, L. sardina. They are sardine-sized teleost fishes of the New World silverside family Atherinopsidae, found only off the coast of California, USA, and Baja California, Mexico. California grunion are found on the Pacific coast, and the gulf grunion are within the Gulf of California.

Many people enjoy watching "grunion runs". Grunion are known for their unusual mating ritual. At semilunar high tides, they ride waves up onto sandy beaches, where females dig their tails into the sand to lay their eggs. Males then wrap around the female to provide their sperm. For the entire period of incubation, grunion eggs remain hidden in the sand. At the next set of high tides, about 10 or 12 days later, the eggs hatch rapidly when washed out to sea, releasing the larvae into the water.

A related New World silverside, the false grunion (Colpichthys regis), lives in the Gulf of California. This fish looks similar and also spawns in the intertidal zone.

== Species ==
The currently recognized species in this genus are:

- Leuresthes sardina (O. P. Jenkins & Evermann, 1889) (Gulf Grunion)
- Leuresthes tenuis (Ayres, 1860) (California Grunion)

== Taxonomy ==
Grunion were originally classified as part of the Old World silverside family, Atherinidae, but are now classified in the family Atherinopsidae along with other New World silversides including their sister species, the jacksmelt and topsmelt. The type specimen, a male, was collected by Ayres from a San Francisco market. It was held at the California Academy of Sciences but lost in the 1905 earthquake. Because the description was from a dead specimen, no mention of the unusual behavior was made, nor was it part of the name.

== Distribution ==
The traditional habitat of the California grunion, L. tenuis, is along the Pacific Coast from Point Conception, California, to Punta Abreojos, Baja California Sur. Recently, they have been found spawning as far north as San Francisco and Tomales Bays. The gulf grunion, L. sardina, is only found in Baja California in the northern region of the Gulf of California.

== Appearance and growth ==
Grunion are small, slender fish with bluish-green backs and silvery sides and bellies. Their snouts are bluntly rounded and slippery. They have no teeth as adults. Silversides differ from true smelts of the family Osmeridae in that they lack the trout-like adipose fin.

Young grunion grow rapidly and are about five inches long by the time they reach one year old and are ready to spawn. Adult fish normally range in size from 6 to 7 in (15 to 18 cm).

Average body lengths for males and females are 4.5 and 5 in (11 and 13 cm), respectively, at the end of one year; 5.5 and 5.8 in (14 and 15 cm) at the end of two years; and 5.9 and 6.3 in (15 and 16 cm) at the end of three years.

The normal lifespan of the grunion is three to four years. Their growth rate slows after the first spawning and stops completely during the spawning season. Consequently, adult fish grow only during the fall and winter. This growth-rate variation causes annuli to form on the scales, which have been used for determining ages.

== Spawning ==
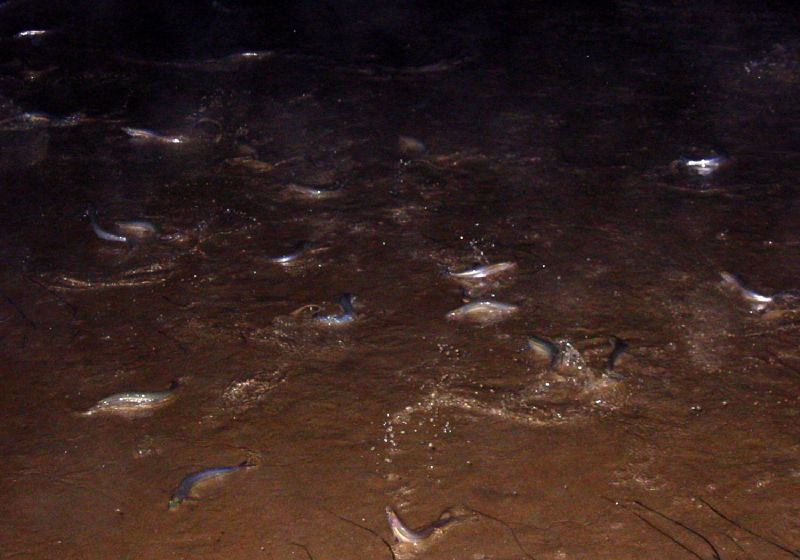
California grunion spawning

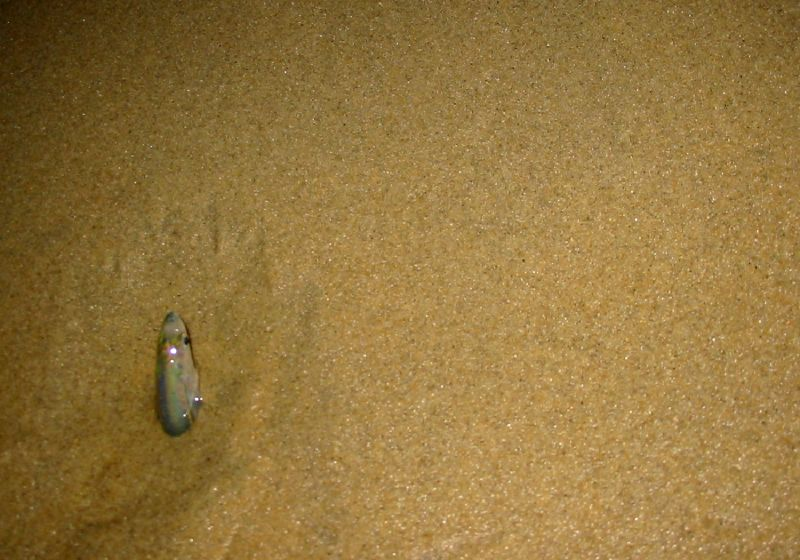
Female grunion getting ready to mate

California grunion spawn on beaches for four nights after the full and new moons of spring and summer. Runs begin soon after high tide and may continue from a few minutes to 2 hours. As a wave recedes on the beach, the grunion drop out of the waves onto the sand. The female arches her body while keeping her head up and excavates the semifluid sand with her tail. The female twists her body and digs tail first until she is buried up to her pectoral fins. Up to eight males may curve around the female and release their milt as she deposits her eggs below the surface. The milt flows through the wet sand to reach the eggs and fertilize them. The female twists free and returns to the sea with the next wave, having released all of her eggs in one clutch. The whole event can happen in 30 seconds, but some fish remain on the beach for several minutes.

After spawning, males may return on additional waves to mate again. Spawning may occur from March through August, with occasional extensions into February and September. However, peak spawning is in April, May, and June. Once mature, an individual may spawn during successive spawning periods at about 15-day intervals. Females may spawn up to six times during the season, from about 1,600 to about 3,600 eggs per cluch, with the larger females producing more eggs. The milt from the male might contain as many as one million sperm. Males may spawn repeatedly during a run.

The eggs incubate a few inches deep in the sand above the level of subsequent tides. They are not immersed in seawater, but are kept moist by the residual water in the sand. While incubating, they are subject to predation by shore birds and sand-dwelling invertebrates. Under normal conditions, they do not have an opportunity to hatch until the next tide series high enough reaches them 10 or more days later. Grunion eggs can extend incubation and delay hatching if tides do not reach them for an additional four weeks after this initial hatching time. Most of the eggs hatch in 10 days if provided with seawater and the agitation of the rising surf. The mechanical action of mixing in the waves is the environmental trigger for hatching, which occurs in less than one minute, with a hatching enzyme that softens the chorion and releases the hatchling from the egg.

The gulf grunion, with its smaller eggs, is unique in that it spawns during both night and daytime, depending on when the highest tides occur.

Although some other fish species leave their eggs in locations in intertidal zones (a few, such as plainfin midshipman, may remain on land with the eggs during low tide) or on plants above the water (splash tetras), jumping onto land en masse to spawn at the water's edge is unique to the grunion, capelin, and grass puffer.

== Feeding ==
Grunion feeding habits are not well understood. They have no teeth and feed on zooplankton, very small organisms such as tiny shrimp or larvae of sea creatures. In an aquarium, grunion eat live brine shrimp.

== Threats ==
The reduction of spawning habitat due to beach erosion, sea-level rise, development, and pollution is believed to be the most critical problem facing the grunion species. An isopod, two species of flies, sandworms, and a beetle have been found preying on the eggs, along with raccoons and ground squirrels. Some shorebirds. such as egrets and herons. prey on grunion when the fish are on shore during spawning. Seagulls, sea lions, dolphins, and larger fish such as halibut, leopard sharks, and Shovelnose guitarfish also feed on grunion.

The gulf grunion is listed as near threatened on the IUCN Red List because of concerns about habitat loss and the lack of any area for future migration.

=== Status of population ===
Despite local concentrations, the grunion is not an abundant species. The population size is not known for certain. Grunion are a restricted resource that can be enjoyed by all as a natural wildlife spectacle as well as with a recreational fishery. Long-term data provided by the Grunion Greeters showed a decline over the past two decades.

== Fishing ==
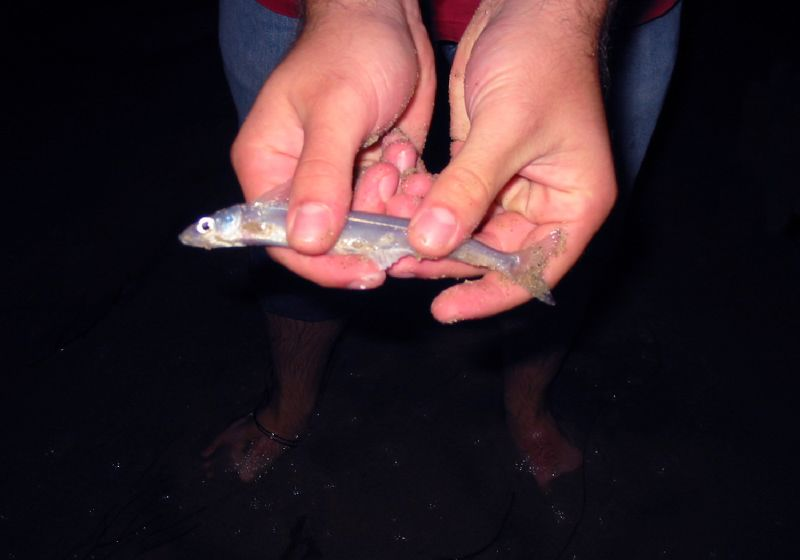
Grunion must be caught by hand (2005)

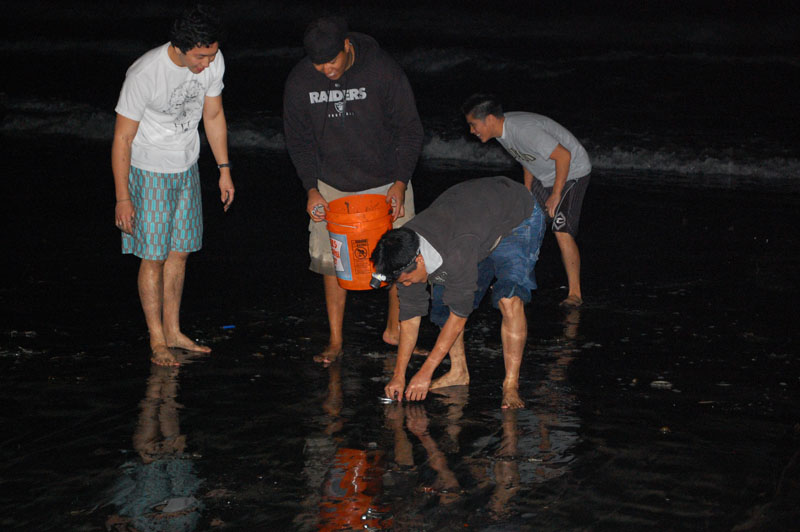
"Grunion run" at La Jolla Shores in San Diego (2008)

In the 1920s, unregulated recreational fishing of grunion caused definite signs of depletion, resulting in a California regulation passed in 1927 that established a closed season of three months from April until June. Grunion stocks improved and in 1947, the closed season was shortened to April and May. In 2022, this closure was returned to its original length of April through June to protect grunion during their peak spawning period, over concern for a population decline.

The periodic appearance of the grunion on Southern California beaches is known as a "grunion run". No fishing license is required for watching the runs. However, to catch grunion, a fishing license is required for persons 16 years and older, and the fish may be taken using bare hands only. No gear of any kind may be used to catch grunion, and no holes may be dug in the beach to entrap them. Grunion may be taken on specified dates in March, July, and August, but not during April, May or June. The limit is 30 grunion per person, but fishermen should take only what they can use, as under Californian law, wasting fish is unlawful. The sport of catching can be combined with "catch and release", as these fish will survive if handled gently and quickly returned to the ocean. With these regulations, the resource may be conserved for future generations to enjoy.

== History ==
The coastal Native Americans in California harvested grunion during spawning runs. Archeologists have found fossil grunion otoliths (tiny, bonelike particles or stony, plate-like structures in the internal ear of lower vertebrates) at various Native American campsites.

Grunion were mentioned by Spanish explorer Juan Rodríguez Cabrillo in his ship's log dated around 1542.

Scientists first identified grunion from a market specimen bought in San Francisco in 1860.
