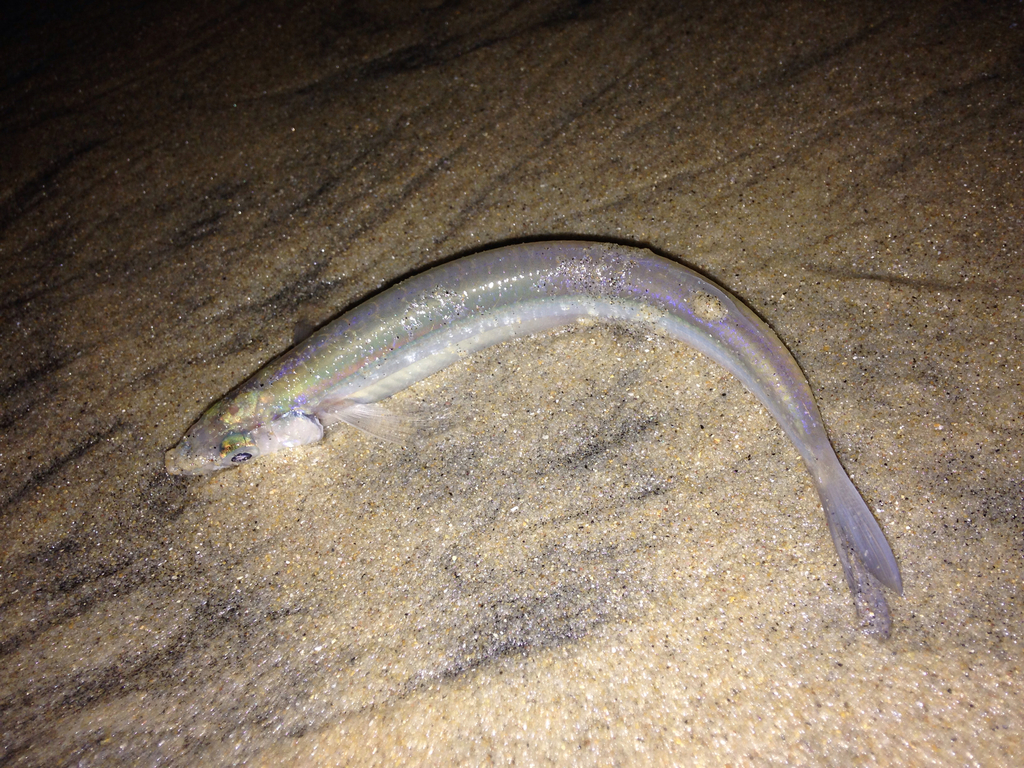

Scientific classification
- Kingdom: Animalia
- Phylum: Chordata
- Class: Actinopterygii
- Order: Atheriniformes
- Family: Atherinopsidae
- Genus: Leuresthes
- Species: L. tenuis

Binomial name
- Leuresthes tenuis (Ayres, 1860)

Synonyms
- Atherinopsis tenuis Ayres, 1860; Leuresthes crameri Jordan & Evermann, 1896

= Leuresthes tenuis =

Species of fish

Leuresthes tenuis, the California grunion, is a species of ray-finned fish native to the Pacific coast of North America from Monterey Bay in California to Baja California. This species grows to 19 cm (7 in) in total length and is of minor importance to local fisheries, particularly during grunion runs in which the fish beach themselves to lay their eggs and are easily taken.

== Description ==
The California grunion is a long, slender fish with a deeply forked tail. The dorsal fin is in two parts and has five to seven spines and nine to ten soft rays. The origin of the anal fin is immediately below the first dorsal fin, and this fin has twenty-one to twenty-four soft rays. The fish grows to a maximum length of 19 cm (7 in). It is greenish above and silvery below. There is a blue patch on the cheek and a silvery-blue lateral stripe along the side.

== Distribution ==
This species is endemic to the eastern Pacific Ocean. Its range extends from Monterey Bay southwards to Baja California, but it is uncommon north of Point Conception. It is also found in the Gulf of California. Its depth range is from the sea surface down to about 18 m (60 ft).

== Breeding ==
Breeding takes place between about March and August and happens on the second, third and fourth nights following the full moon, a little while after the tide has peaked. The fish swim towards a sandy beach and are carried up the shore by the advancing waves. Each female then digs herself into the sand tail first and lays a clutch of eggs in the wet sand. Several males may attempt to mate with one female, curling around her while they shed their milt, after which they get washed back to the sea. The female finishes laying her eggs, emerges from the sand and moves down the beach, the whole process usually taking half minute or so. The eggs remain buried in the sand until the next series of spring tides following the new moon a fortnight later. In the laboratory it has been shown that the eggs develop and are ready to hatch after about ten days, but only actually hatch after a period of agitation, as might occur when waves were pounding the sand in which they were buried and scouring away the sand covering them. By the time this happens in the wild, a fortnight after the eggs were laid, the female fish will have another batch of mature eggs, and may deposit these eggs in a similar manner at night during the exceptionally high tides associated with the new moon.

Although some other fish species leave their eggs in locations that dry out (a few, such as plainfin midshipman, may even remain on land with the eggs during low tide) or on plants above the water (splash tetras), jumping onto land en masse to spawn is unique to the two grunions, capelin and grass puffer.

== Feeding ==
The fish feed on plankton such as copepods. They are preyed on by California halibut, rock bass, white croakers and other large predators. Humans catch them for culinary use or use them as bait. The eggs are at risk from shore birds such as the whimbrel and the marbled godwit, which probe the sand with their beaks. The eggs are also sought by sandworms, ground squirrels, a species of isopod, and certain beetles and flies.
