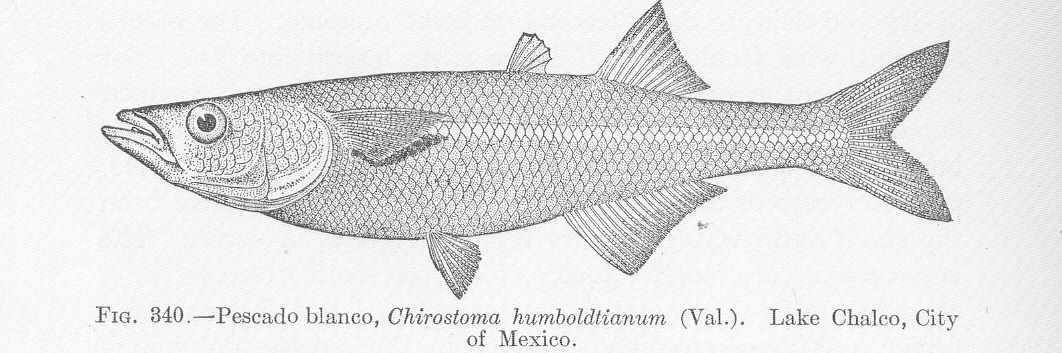

Conservation status
- Vulnerable (IUCN 3.1)

Scientific classification
- Kingdom: Animalia
- Phylum: Chordata
- Class: Actinopterygii
- Order: Atheriniformes
- Family: Atherinopsidae
- Genus: Chirostoma
- Species: C. humboldtianum

Binomial name
- Chirostoma humboldtianum (Valenciennes, 1835)

Synonyms
- Atherina humboldtiana Valenciennes, 1835; Chirostoma regani D. S. Jordan & C. L. Hubbs, 1919; Atherina vomerina Valenciennes, 1835; Chirostoma ocampoi Álvarez, 1963

= Chirostoma humboldtianum =

Species of fish

Chirostoma humboldtianum, the shortfin silverside, is a species of neotropical silverside endemic to Mexico. It reaches a maximum length of around 20 cm. This species was described as Atherina humboldtiana by Achille Valenciennes in 1835 with a type locality of "Mexico". Valenciennes gave it its specific name in honour of the Prussian explorer Alexander von Humboldt (1769-1859).
