= Chirostoma attenuatum =

Conservation status
- Endangered (IUCN 3.1)

Scientific classification
- Kingdom: Animalia
- Phylum: Chordata
- Class: Actinopterygii
- Order: Atheriniformes
- Family: Atherinopsidae
- Genus: Chirostoma
- Species: C. attenuatum

Binomial name
- Chirostoma attenuatum S.E. Meek, 1902

Synonyms
- Chirostoma samani Terrón, 1931; Chirostoma bartoni janitzio de Buen, 1940

Species of fish

Chirostoma attenuatum – also known as slender silverside – was featured in the 2009 IUCN Red List of Threatened Species and the American Fisheries Society. They are found in Patzcuaro, Central Mexico. The species is at risk of being extinct. Eight helminth species, type of parasitic worms, including Posthodiplostomum minimum, Allocreadium mexicanum, Bothriocephalus acheilognathi, a cyclophyllidean cysticercoid, Arhythmorhynchus brevis, Spinitectus carolini, Capilaria patrcuarensis, and Eustrongylides sp., were discovered in 195 Chirostoma attenuatum fish from Lake Patzcuaro from October 1989 to December 1990. Posthodiplostomum minimum had the highest frequency and intensity; it had the most impact in harming the Chirostoma attenuatum fish.
