= Atherinella elegans =

Conservation status
- Data Deficient (IUCN 3.1)

Scientific classification
- Kingdom: Animalia
- Phylum: Chordata
- Class: Actinopterygii
- Order: Atheriniformes
- Family: Atherinopsidae
- Genus: Atherinella
- Species: A. elegans

Binomial name
- Atherinella elegans Chernoff, 1986

Species of fish

Atherinella elegans (the Fuerte silverside) is a species of fish in the family Atherinopsidae, the Neotropical silversides. It is endemic to the Río del Fuerte, Sinaloa, Mexico.
