= Leuresthes sardina =

Conservation status
- Near Threatened (IUCN 3.1)

Scientific classification
- Kingdom: Animalia
- Phylum: Chordata
- Class: Actinopterygii
- Order: Atheriniformes
- Family: Atherinopsidae
- Genus: Leuresthes
- Species: L. sardina

Binomial name
- Leuresthes sardina (Jenkins & Evermann, 1889)

Synonyms
- Atherina sardina Jenkins & Evermann, 1889; Menidia clara Evermann & Jenkins, 1891; Leuresthes clara (Evermann & Jenkins, 1891)

Species of fish

Leuresthes sardina, commonly known as Gulf grunion, is a species of grunion endemic to the Gulf of California. It is classified as Near Threatened by the IUCN.
