= Odontesthes mauleanum =

Conservation status
- Near Threatened (IUCN 2.3)

Scientific classification
- Kingdom: Animalia
- Phylum: Chordata
- Class: Actinopterygii
- Order: Atheriniformes
- Family: Atherinopsidae
- Genus: Odontesthes
- Species: O. mauleanum

Binomial name
- Odontesthes mauleanum (Steindachner, 1896)

Synonyms
- Cauque mauleanum (Steindachner, 1896); Chirostoma mauleanum Steindachner, 1896

Species of fish

Odontesthe mauleanum is a species of fish in the family Atherinopsidae. It is endemic to Chile.
