= Van Hyning =

Van Hyning is a surname. Notable people with the surname include:

- Howard Van Hyning (1936–2010), American percussionist
- Thompson Van Hyning (1861–1948), American physician and naturalist
