= Odontesthes gracilis =

Conservation status
- Data Deficient (IUCN 2.3)

Scientific classification
- Kingdom: Animalia
- Phylum: Chordata
- Class: Actinopterygii
- Order: Atheriniformes
- Family: Atherinopsidae
- Genus: Odontesthes
- Species: O. gracilis

Binomial name
- Odontesthes gracilis (Steindachner, 1898)

Synonyms
- Chirostoma gracile Steindachner, 1898; Atherinichthys gracilis (Steindachner, 1898); Austromenidia gracilis (Steindachner, 1898); Basilichthys gracilis (Steindachner, 1898)

Species of fish

Odontesthes gracilis is a species of fish in the family Atherinidae. It is endemic to the Juan Fernandez Islands off Chile. It occurs around the mouths of caves, in inlets and around piers. This is a species which can be found in freshwater, brackish and marine waters. This species was described as Chirostoma gracile in 1898 by Franz Steindachner with the type locality given as Más a Tierra.
