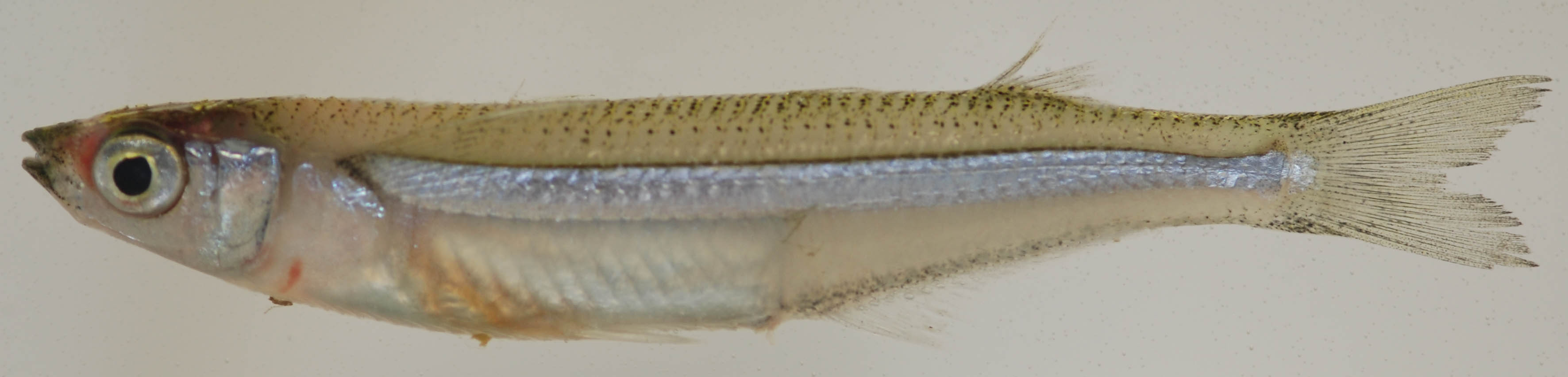

Conservation status
- Least Concern (IUCN 3.1)

Scientific classification
- Kingdom: Animalia
- Phylum: Chordata
- Class: Actinopterygii
- Order: Atheriniformes
- Family: Atherinopsidae
- Genus: Membras
- Species: M. martinica

Binomial name
- Membras martinica (Valenciennes, 1835)

Synonyms
- Atherina martinica Valenciennes, 1835

= Membras martinica =

Species of fish

Membras martinica, the rough silverside, is a species of Neotropical silverside from the family Atherinopsidae, it is the type species of the genus Membras.

== Description ==
Membras martinica has an elongated body with a rather pointed snout and oblique mouth. The color is pale yellow to off-white with silvery stripe along the flanks and a white swimbladder which can be seen through its flesh. There are two dorsal fins, there are only spines in the first dorsal fin. The pectoral fins are situated high on its flanks. The back has parallel colored rows. This species has scales which are rough to the touch. The caudal fin has a dusky margin. The maximum recorded total length of 12.5 centimetres (4.9 in).

== Distribution ==
Membras martinica occurs in the western central Atlantic as far north as New York south to Veracruz in Mexico. It has also been recorded in rivers, for example in the Hudson River as far upstream as Peekskill, New York and far upstream in the St. John's River, Florida as well as from a number of Mexican river systems.

== Habitat and biology ==
Membras martinica is a pelagic species which occurs in a variety of different habitat types. The normal habitat is exposed shoreline and beaches where there is a firm substrate is also occurs on coastal rivers. On the coastlines around the Gulf of Mexico the females are ripe in the warmer months from early Spring in to the early fall with a hiatus reported between May and July. This results in two size classes of juveniles each year. Spawning occurs just beyond the surf zone and the eggs are demersal and stick to each other, forming large clusters which are transported into the intertidal zone by the waves.

== Species description and taxonomy ==
Membras martinica is the type species of the genus Membras. It was described by Achille Valenciennes in 1835 as Atherina martinica from a type locality of Martinique, the island from which the specific name is derived.
