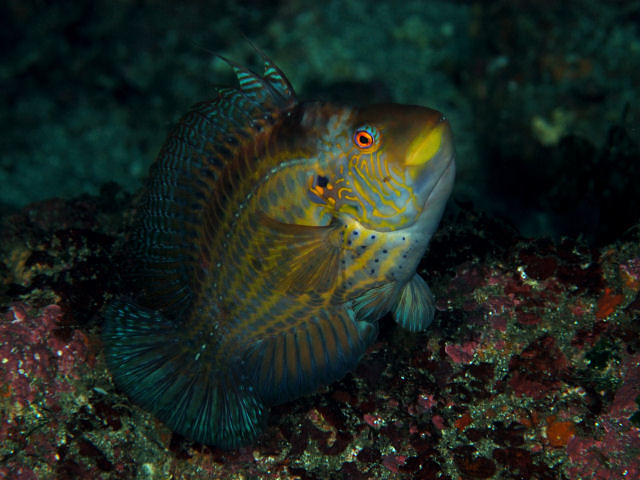
- Pteragogus aurigarius

Scientific classification
- Kingdom: Animalia
- Phylum: Chordata
- Class: Actinopterygii
- Order: Labriformes
- Family: Labridae
- Subfamily: Cirrhilabrinae
- Genus: Pteragogus; W. K. H. Peters, 1855

Type species
- Cossyphus opercularis W. K. H. Peters, 1855

Synonyms
- Duymaeria Bleeker, 1856; Labrastrum Guichenot, 1860

= Pteragogus =

Genus of fishes

Pteragogus is a genus of wrasses native to the Indian Ocean and the western Pacific Ocean.

== Species ==
The 10 currently recognized species in this genus are:

- Pteragogus aurigarius (J. Richardson, 1845)
- Pteragogus clarkae J. E. Randall, 2013
- Pteragogus cryptus J. E. Randall, 1981 (cryptic wrasse)
- Pteragogus enneacanthus (Bleeker, 1853) (cockerel wrasse)
- Pteragogus flagellifer (Valenciennes, 1839) (cocktail wrasse)
- Pteragogus guttatus (Fowler & B. A. Bean, 1928) (sneaky wrasse)
- Pteragogus pelycus J. E. Randall, 1981 (sideburn wrasse)
- Pteragogus taeniops (W. K. H. Peters, 1855) (cheekbar wrasse)
- Pteragogus trispilus J. E. Randall, 2013
- Pteragogus variabilis J. E. Randall, 2013
