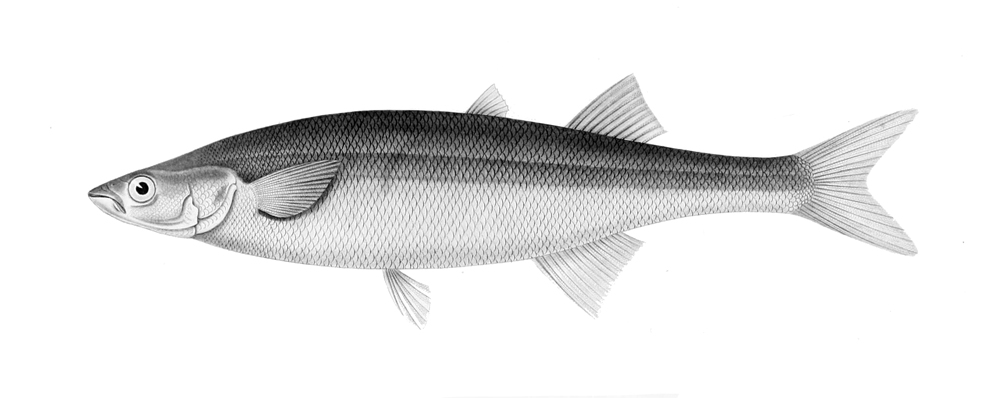

Conservation status
- Data Deficient (IUCN 3.1)

Scientific classification
- Kingdom: Animalia
- Phylum: Chordata
- Class: Actinopterygii
- Division: Teleostei
- Order: Atheriniformes
- Family: Atherinopsidae
- Genus: Basilichthys
- Species: B. microlepidotus

Binomial name
- Basilichthys microlepidotus (Jenyns, 1841)

Synonyms
- Atherina microlepidota Jenyns, 1841; Protistius microlepidotus (Jenyns, 1841)

= Basilichthys microlepidotus =

Species of fish

Basilichthys microlepidotus is a species of Neotropical silverside endemic to Chile. It s a pelagic freshwater species which occurs from the Huasco River to Valparaíso.
