= Odontesthes regia =

Conservation status
- Least Concern (IUCN 3.1)

Scientific classification
- Kingdom: Animalia
- Phylum: Chordata
- Class: Actinopterygii
- Order: Atheriniformes
- Family: Atherinopsidae
- Genus: Odontesthes
- Species: O. regia

Binomial name
- Odontesthes regia (Humboldt, 1821)

Synonyms
- Atherina regia Humboldt, 1821; Austromenidia regia (Humboldt, 1821); Atherina laticlavia Valenciennes, 1835; Austromenidia laticlava (Valenciennes, 1835); Chirostoma affine Steindachner, 1898; Basilichthys regillus Abbott, 1899; Cauque regillus (Abbott, 1899); Odontesthes regillus (Abbott, 1899); Basilichthys jordani Abbott, 1899; Basilichthys octavius Abbott, 1899

Species of fish

Odontesthes regia is a fish belonging to the family Atherinopsidae, commonly referred to in English as Chilean silverside, Peruvian silverside or sea silverside, and in Spanish as pejerrey or pejerrey de mar.

This is an epipelagic species distributed from the north Pacific coast of Peru to the Aysén Region, in Chile. The species has great economic importance as a fresh staple food. Although the family Atherinopsidae includes 104 species (13 genera), only 17 species have been cytogenetically studied to date; cytogenetic studies in this group are still scarce.
