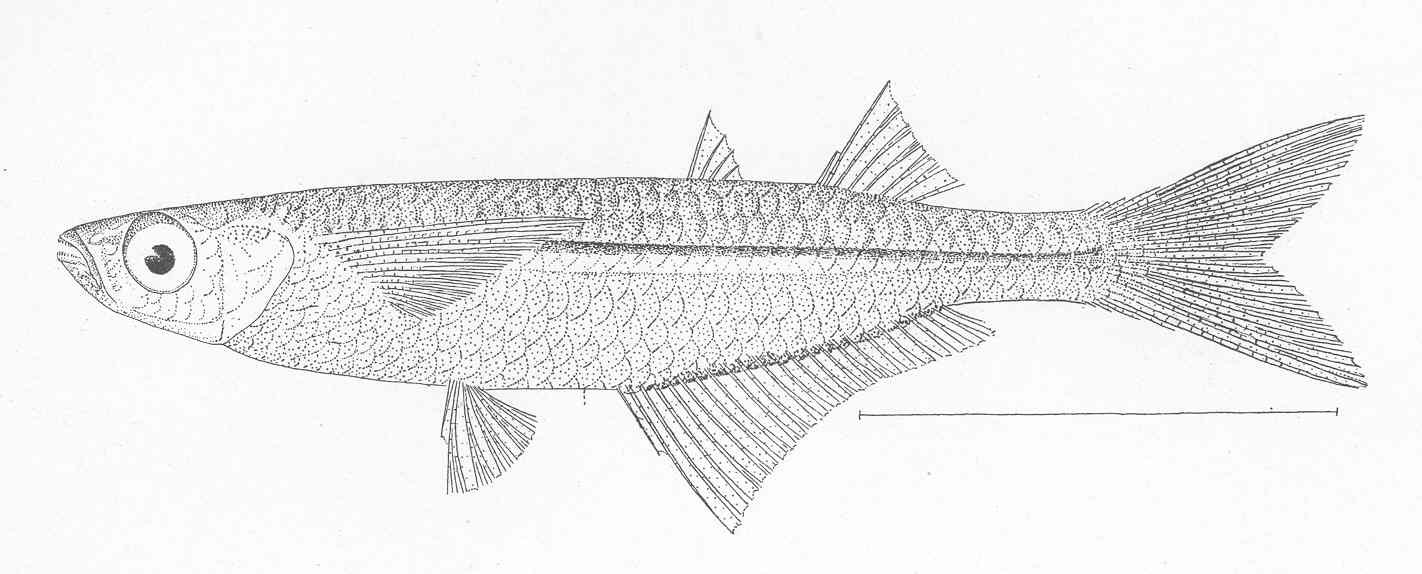

Conservation status
- Least Concern (IUCN 3.1)

Scientific classification
- Kingdom: Animalia
- Phylum: Chordata
- Class: Actinopterygii
- Order: Atheriniformes
- Family: Atherinopsidae
- Genus: Atherinella
- Species: A. crystallina

Binomial name
- Atherinella crystallina (D. S. Jordan & Culver, 1895)

Synonyms
- Thyrina crystallina Jordan & Culver, 1895; Thyrina evermanni Jordan & Culver, 1895; Atherinella evermanni (Jordan & Culver, 1895)

= Atherinella crystallina =

Species of fish

Atherinella crystallina is a species of Neotropical silversides (Atherinopsidae). It is found from the Río Sinaloa to Río Verde, Jalisco, Sinaloa, Mexico. It is normally a freshwater species but it also occurs in estuaries as deep as 10 metres (33 ft). Their food includes zooplankton, pelagic fish larvae and pelagic fish eggs. A. crystallina was described as Thyrina crystallina by David Starr Jordan and George Bliss Culver in 1895 from types collected from the Río Presidio in Sinaloa, western Mexico.
