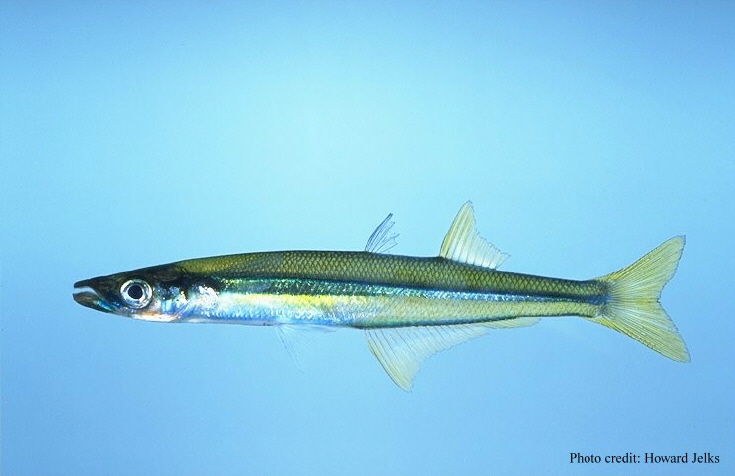

Conservation status
- Least Concern (IUCN 3.1)

Scientific classification
- Kingdom: Animalia
- Phylum: Chordata
- Class: Actinopterygii
- Division: Teleostei
- Order: Atheriniformes
- Family: Atherinopsidae
- Genus: Labidesthes
- Species: L. sicculus

Binomial name
- Labidesthes sicculus (Cope, 1865)

Synonyms
- Chirostoma sicculum Cope, 1865

= Brook silverside =

Species of fish

Labidesthes sicculus, also known as the brook silverside, is a North American species of Neotropical silverside. The brook silverside lives in slow moving rivers and lakes from the Great Lakes to the Mississippi Basin and Gulf Coastal Plains. The brook silverside survives best in clear water with aquatic vegetation. L. sicculus feeds on a diet of copepods, insect larvae, and winged insects. The spawning season of the brook silverside occurs during the spring and early summer. The survival of freshwater fishes such as the brook silverside is increasingly threatened. In order to ensure survival of the brook silverside, turbidity of natural habitats should be monitored. Adults typically reach a length of about 3 inches (7.6 cm), with a maximum recorded length of approximately 5.1 inches (13 cm).

== Geographic distribution ==
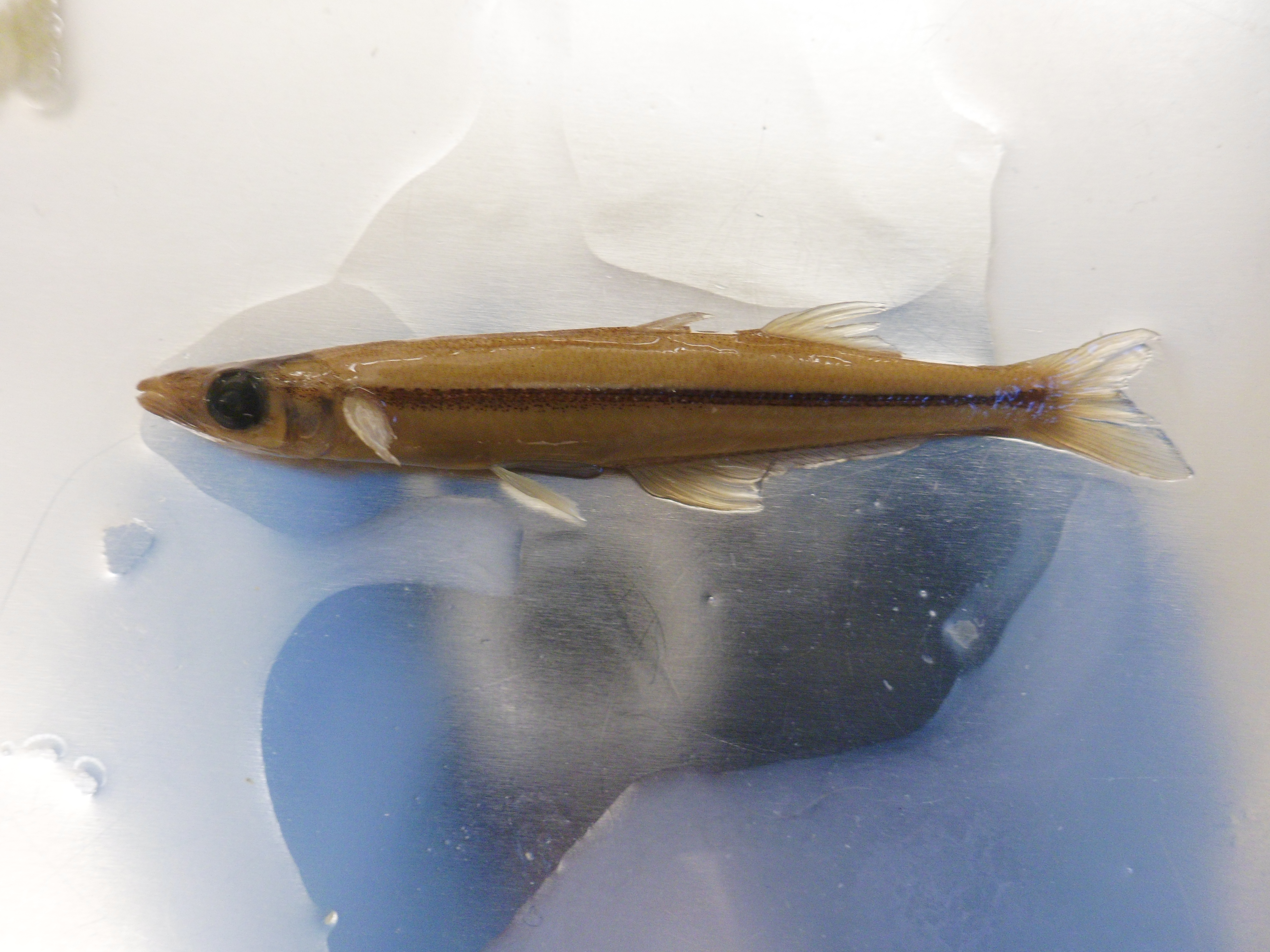
A preserved specimen of Labidesthes sicculus

The distribution of brook silverside populations range from the Great Lakes southward through the Mississippi Basin and Gulf Coastal Plains (including 27 U.S. states and parts of Canada). It is native to the majority of this distribution, but has also been stocked outside of its natural range as forage food for sport fishes. The brook silverside occupies freshwater lakes, ponds, quiet pools and small rivers. The environment ranges from cool to warm water with variability in levels of gradient and vegetation. Consistently, however, the brook silverside prefers clear water with low substrate concentrations. The brook silverside is vulnerable to turbid waters. In Tennessee, brook silverside populations were shown to have decreased shortly after the construction of the Tennessee-Tombigbee Waterway. Populations likely declined because of introduced competition.

== Ecology ==
The brook silverside is on the lower end of the food chain, and is preyed on by many larger fish. The diet of the brook silverside consists mostly of zooplankton. They are highly specialized feeders with cladocerans comprising 80% of their diet, (40%) small flying insects, and (20%) midge larvae. Their diet varies with life stages and seasons. At a younger age, the brook silverside preys mostly on smaller fish. Their diet shifts to immature insects later. During winter, the brook silverside eats mostly planktonic crustaceans. Because of both intentional and unintentional species introduction, the brook silverside must compete for food sources. Specifically, the brook silverside has been forced to compete with the non-native Menidia audens, which was introduced by waterway construction. This forced competition of resources has led to a decrease in brook silverside populations.

== Life history ==
The brook silverside breeds in the summer from late May to mid-August. Their life span is only one year. During the first year, they have rapid growth, growing up to one millimeter per day. Brook silversides quickly reach a maximum size of approximately eight centimeters. They reach sexual maturity by the first summer in order to reproduce. Some studies report that brook silversides reproduce by internal fertilization, although this has not been entirely confirmed. When the eggs are produced, they have an attached filament, which allows for the eggs to be deposited on logs, plants and rocks. Temperature does not affect the sex of fish. After the eggs hatch, they immediately swim away from the shore into deeper water, but still stay just under the surface. They congregate in large schools. The brook silverside migrates throughout its life cycle. No human-induced changes are reported as affecting the life history. Human-induced changes are reported as more strongly affecting populations rather than behaviors.

== Current management ==
Human intervention through species introduction, habitat alteration, pollution, and construction are causing the decline of the brook silverside and other freshwater fishes. Freshwater fishes account for the majority of extinctions in ray-finned fishes. To stabilize and increase populations, no more dams or waterways should be built. Additionally, pollution must be stopped. Agricultural runoff creates turbid waters, which the brook silverside cannot thrive in. Stream sampling occurs through organizations such as USFWS and TVA (locally). This allows for populations to be monitored and stream chemistry to be controlled. Over-fishing and hybridization aren't causing brook silverside populations to decline. Invasive species and habitat destruction have the greatest impact on population decline. Areas are being reserved for the preservation of endemic fish, but more must still be done.
