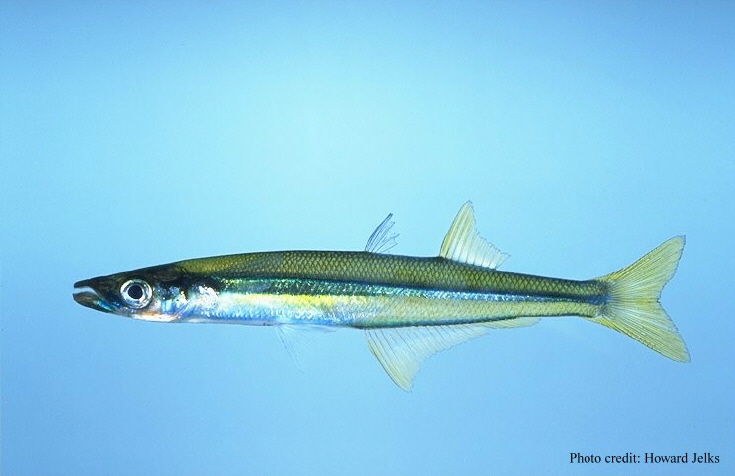
- Labidesthes sicculus

Scientific classification
- Domain: Eukaryota
- Kingdom: Animalia
- Phylum: Chordata
- Class: Actinopterygii
- Order: Atheriniformes
- Family: Atherinopsidae
- Tribe: Mendiniini
- Genus: Labidesthes; Cope, 1870

Type species
- Chirostoma sicculum Cope, 1865

= Labidesthes =

Genus of fishes

Labidesthes is a genus of Neotropical silverside found in Gulf of Mexico drainages (including the Brazos River, Mississippi River, Neches River, Pearl River), east around the southern tip of peninsular Florida and north to the Pee Dee River drainage and the Great Lakes (excluding Lake Superior)- St-Lawrence River drainages.

== Species ==
There are currently 2 recognized species in this genus:

- Labidesthes sicculus (Cope, 1865) (Brook silverside)
- Labidesthes vanhyningi B. A. Bean & Reid, 1930 (Golden silverside)
