= Chirostoma charari =

Conservation status
- Critically endangered, possibly extinct (IUCN 3.1)

Scientific classification
- Kingdom: Animalia
- Phylum: Chordata
- Class: Actinopterygii
- Order: Atheriniformes
- Family: Atherinopsidae
- Genus: Chirostoma
- Species: C. charari

Binomial name
- Chirostoma charari de Buen, 1945

Synonyms
- Eslopsarum bartoni charari

Extinct species of fish

Chirostoma charari, the least silverside, is a species of neotropical silverside endemic to Mexico. This species has only been found in a spring in the Lake Cuitzeo basin on the Mesa Central of the Mexican Plateau. It has a longer head and jaw, as well as larger teeth and eyes than other Chirostoma species. Its status is rated as Critically Endangered by the IUCN, and may possibly be extinct.
