= Chirostoma bartoni =

Conservation status
- Critically endangered, possibly extinct (IUCN 3.1)

Scientific classification
- Kingdom: Animalia
- Phylum: Chordata
- Class: Actinopterygii
- Order: Atheriniformes
- Family: Atherinopsidae
- Genus: Chirostoma
- Species: C. bartoni

Binomial name
- Chirostoma bartoni D. S. Jordan & Evermann, 1896

Extinct species of fish

Chirostoma bartoni, the Alberca silverside, is a species of neotropical silverside endemic to the Lerma River basin of Mexico. Typical adult specimens are approximately 7.1 cm in length.

The Alberca silverside was found only in the Alberca Caldera, Guanajuato, Mexico and likely became extinct when the caldera temporarily dried up in August 2006.

== Etymology ==
The specific name honours Barton Appler Bean (1860-1947) who was Assistant Curator of Fishes at the U.S. National Museum.
