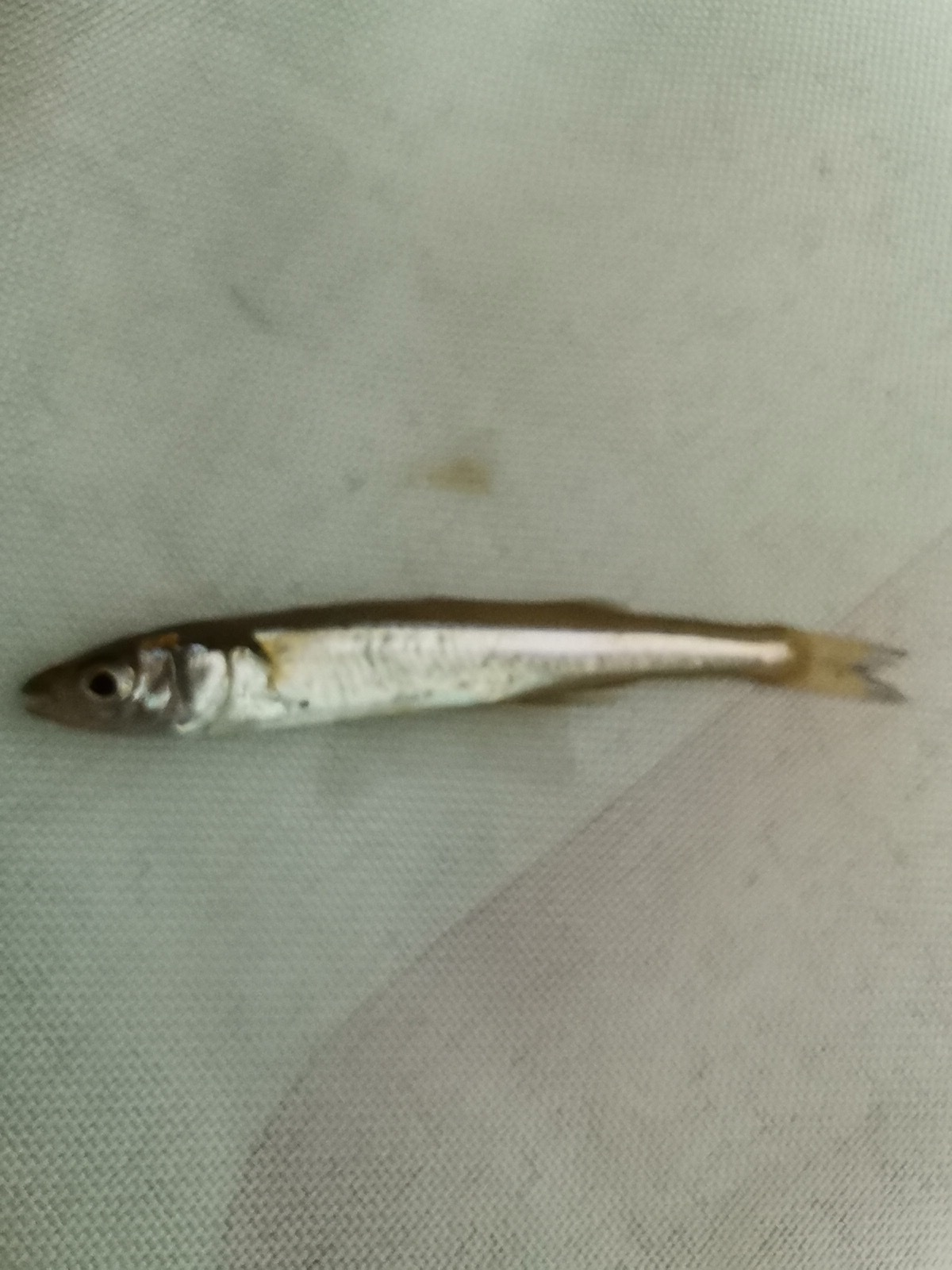

Conservation status
- Near Threatened (IUCN 2.3)

Scientific classification
- Kingdom: Animalia
- Phylum: Chordata
- Class: Actinopterygii
- Division: Teleostei
- Order: Atheriniformes
- Family: Atherinopsidae
- Genus: Basilichthys
- Species: B. australis

Binomial name
- Basilichthys australis C. H. Eigenmann, 1928

= Basilichthys australis =

Species of fish

Basilichthys australis is a species of Neotropical silverside fish which is endemic to Chile from the Rio Maipo south to Chiloé Island.
