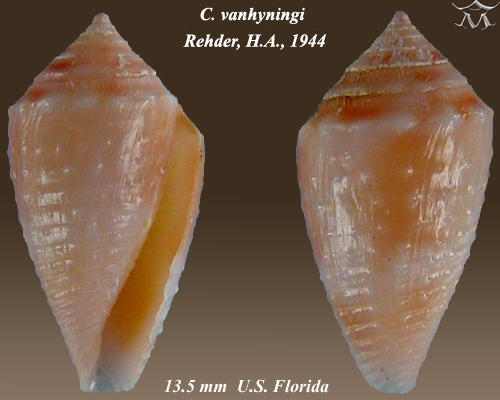
- Apertural and abapertural views of shell of Conasprella vanhyningi (Rehder, H.A., 1944)
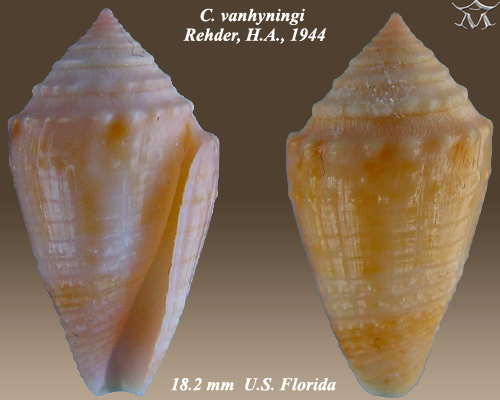

Scientific classification
- Kingdom: Animalia
- Phylum: Mollusca
- Class: Gastropoda
- Subclass: Caenogastropoda
- Order: Neogastropoda
- Superfamily: Conoidea
- Family: Conidae
- Genus: Conasprella
- Species: C. vanhyningi

Binomial name
- Conasprella vanhyningi (Rehder, 1944)

Synonyms
- Conasprella (Ximeniconus) vanhyningi (Rehder, 1944) · accepted, alternate representation; Conus vanhyningi Rehder, 1944 (original combination); Jaspidiconus vanhyningi (Rehder, 1944)

= Conasprella vanhyningi =

Species of gastropod

Conasprella vanhyningi is a species of sea snail, a marine gastropod mollusk in the family Conidae, the cone snails and their allies. It is named after malacologist Thompson Van Hyning.

Like all species within the genus Conasprella, these cone snails are predatory and venomous. They are capable of stinging humans, therefore live ones should be handled carefully or not at all.

== Description ==
The size of the shell varies between 15 mm and 55 mm.

== Distribution ==
Locus typicus: Off Pompano Beach, Florida. This marine species occurs off Eastern Florida.

== Gallery ==
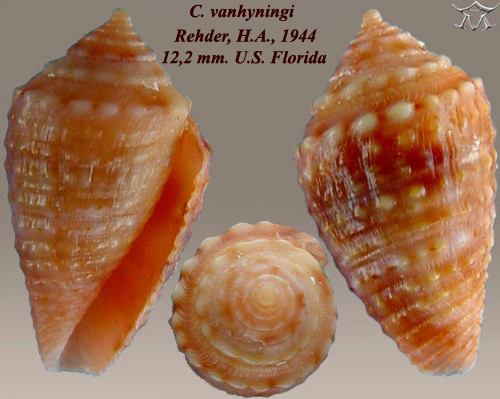
Conasprella vanhyningi (Rehder, H.A., 1944)

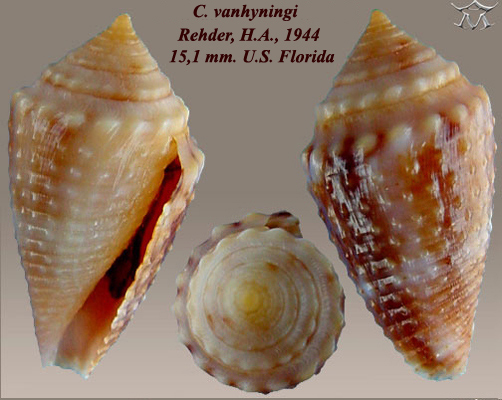
Conasprella vanhyningi (Rehder, H.A., 1944)

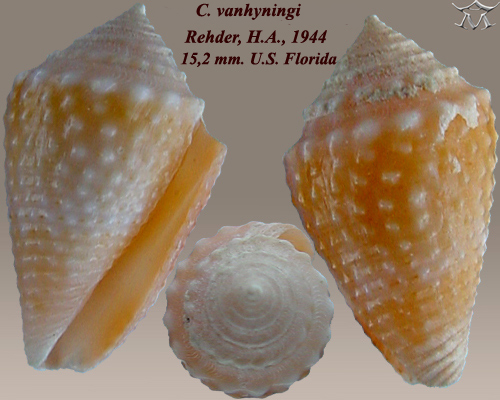
Conasprella vanhyningi (Rehder, H.A., 1944)

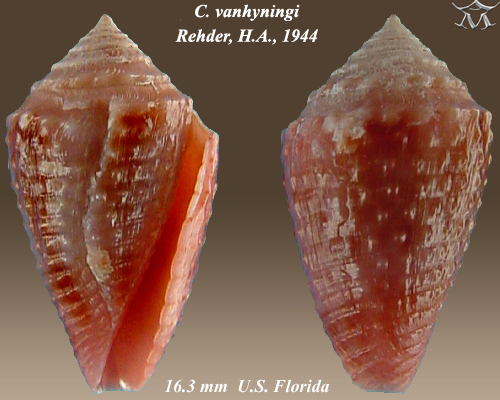
Conasprella vanhyningi (Rehder, H.A., 1944)

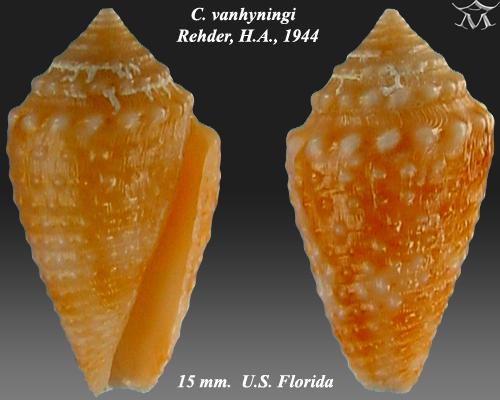
Conasprella vanhyningi (Rehder, H.A., 1944)

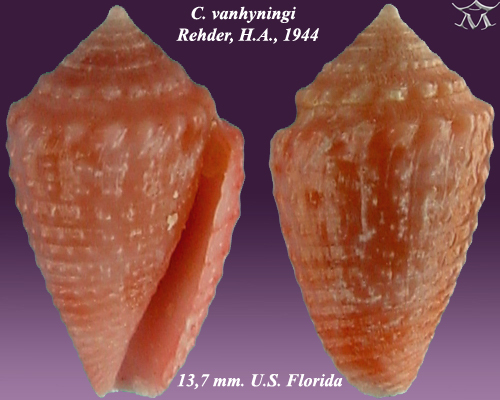
Conasprella vanhyningi (Rehder, H.A., 1944)

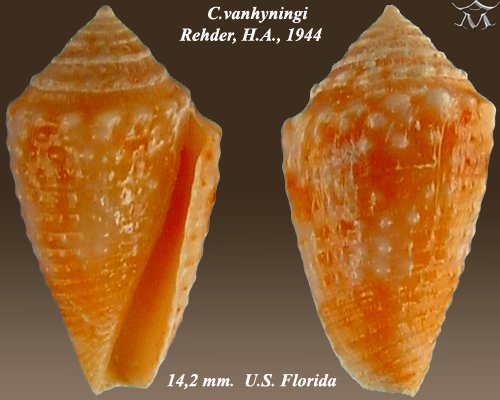
Conasprella vanhyningi (Rehder, H.A., 1944)

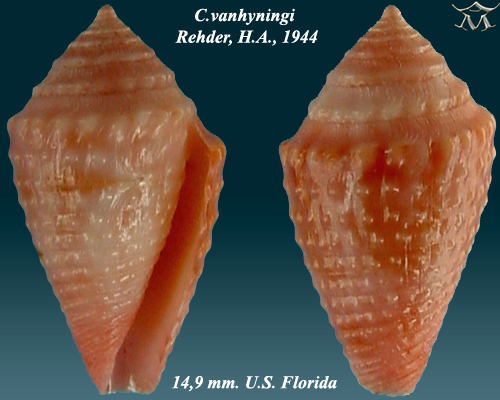
Conasprella vanhyningi (Rehder, H.A., 1944)

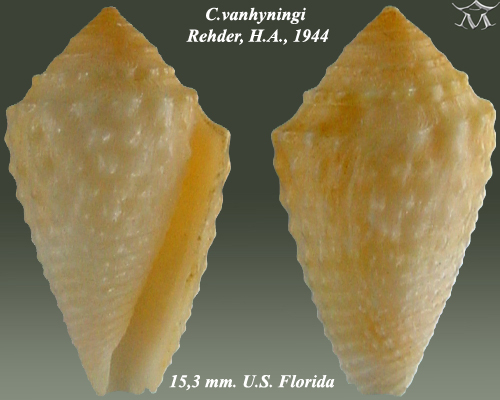
Conasprella vanhyningi (Rehder, H.A., 1944)
