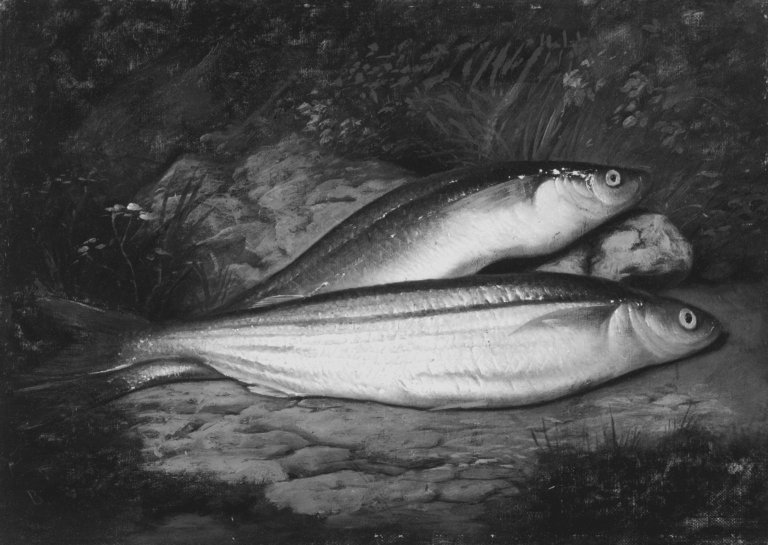
- California smelt Atherinopsis californiensis

Scientific classification
- Kingdom: Animalia
- Phylum: Chordata
- Class: Actinopterygii
- Order: Atheriniformes
- Family: Atherinopsidae
- Subfamily: Atherinopsinae; Fitzinger, 1873

= Atherinopsinae =

Subfamily of fishes

Atherinopsinae is a subfamily of the Neotropical silversides, part of the family Atherinopsidae. This subfamily is made up of two tribes, six genera and around 30 species. They are found in the eastern Pacific and south-western Atlantic and the subfamily contains marine, brackish and freshwater species.

== Tribes and genera ==
According to the 5th edition of Fishes of the World the Atherinopsinae is divided as set out below:

- Tribe Atherinopsini
  - Genus Atherinops Steindachner, 1876
  - Genus Atherinopsis Girard, 1854
  - Genus Colpichthys Hubbs, 1918
  - Genus Leuresthes Jordan & Gilbert, 1880
- Tribe Sorgentinini
  - Genus Basilichthys Girard, 1855
  - Genus Odontesthes Evermann & Kendall, 1906
