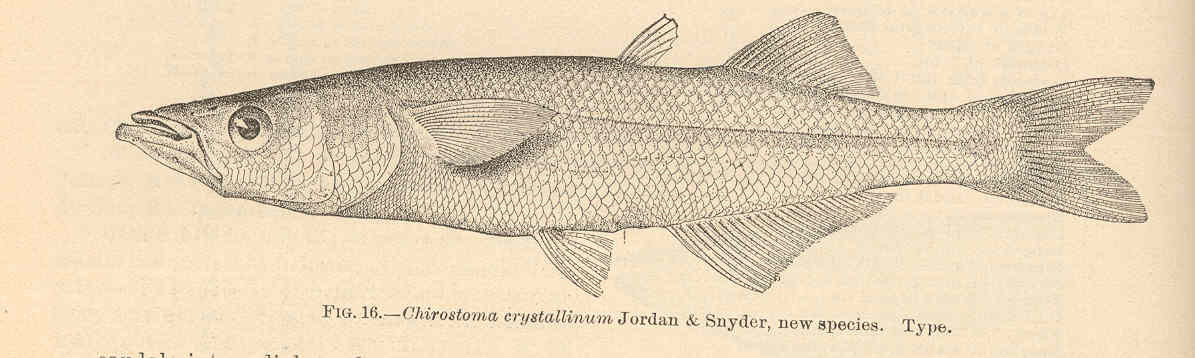
- Chirostoma lucius
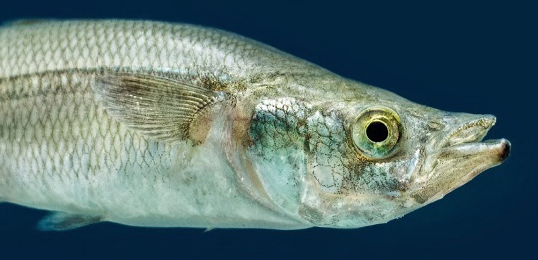
- Chirostoma estor

Scientific classification
- Kingdom: Animalia
- Phylum: Chordata
- Class: Actinopterygii
- Division: Teleostei
- Order: Atheriniformes
- Family: Atherinopsidae
- Subfamily: Menidiinae
- Tribe: Mendiniini
- Genus: Chirostoma; Swainson, 1839

Type species
- Atherina humboldtiana Valenciennes 1835

Synonyms
- Atherinichthys Bleeker, 1853; Atherinoides Bleeker, 1853; Charalia F. de Buen, 1945; Eslopsarum D.S. Jordan & B.W. Evermann, 1896; Heterognathus Girard, 1855; Lethostole D.S. Jordan & B.W. Evermann, 1896; Ocotlanichthys F. de Buen, 1945; Otalia F. de Buen, 1945; Palmichthys F. de Buen, 1945

= Chirostoma =

Chirostoma Temporal range: 5–0 Ma Pliocene to Present

Genus of fishes

Chirostoma is a genus of Neotropical silversides from the Lerma River basin in Mexico, including lakes Chapala and Pátzcuaro. Fish in the genus collectively go by the common name charal/charales in their native range (a name also used for the related Poblana). They are heavily fished, but several of the species have become threatened due to habitat loss (pollution, water extraction and drought), introduced species and overfishing. Three species are considered extinct: C. bartoni (disappeared 2006), C. charari (1957) and C. compressum (1900). Four others have not been recorded recently and may also be extinct.

== Appearance and behavior ==
Chirostoma are generally silvery-white, pale gray-brown or dull yellowish in color, and have a long horizontal line on the side of the body (inconspicuous and more spotty in some species). They vary in size, ranging from species that are less than 10 cm (4 in) long to species that can surpass 40 cm (16 in). Despite the differences, there is great overlap in the food choice of these filter feeders with the main diet being composed of various small organisms (mostly planktonic) such as copepods, cladocerans, rotifers, amphipods, oligochaetes, nematodes, insect larvae, and fish eggs and embryos (including those of silversides).

They are ovoviviparous and employ external fertilization. During spawning each female lays a few hundred to a few thousand eggs.

== Species ==
There are currently 23 recognized species in this genus. Additionally, the 4 Poblana species are sometimes included in Chirostoma instead of being placed in a separate genus. Several species of Chirostoma can hybridize.

- Chirostoma aculeatum C. D. Barbour, 1973 (Scowling silverside)
- Chirostoma arge (D. S. Jordan & Snyder, 1899) (Largetooth silverside)
- Chirostoma attenuatum Meek, 1902 (Slender silverside)
- †Chirostoma bartoni D. S. Jordan & Evermann, 1896 (Alberca silverside)
- Chirostoma chapalae D. S. Jordan & Snyder, 1899 (Smallmouth silverside)
- †Chirostoma charari (F. de Buen, 1945) (Least silverside)
- †Chirostoma compressum F. de Buen, 1940
- Chirostoma consocium D. S. Jordan & C. L. Hubbs, 1919 (Ranch silverside)
- Chirostoma contrerasi C. D. Barbour, 2002 (Ajijic silverside)
- Chirostoma copandaro F. de Buen, 1945
- Chirostoma estor D. S. Jordan, 1880 (Pike silverside)
- Chirostoma grandocule (Steindachner, 1894) (Bigeye silverside)
- Chirostoma humboldtianum (Valenciennes, 1835) (Shortfin silverside)
- Chirostoma jordani Woolman, 1894 (Charal)
- Chirostoma labarcae Meek, 1902 (Sharpnose silverside)
- Chirostoma lucius Boulenger, 1900 (Longjaw silverside)
- Chirostoma melanoccus Álvarez, 1963 (Blunthead silverside)
- Chirostoma patzcuaro Meek, 1902 (Patzcuaro silverside)
- Chirostoma promelas D. S. Jordan & Snyder, 1899 (Blacknose silverside)
- Chirostoma reseratum Álvarez, 1963
- Chirostoma riojai Solórzano & Y. López, 1966 (Toluca silverside)
- Chirostoma sphyraena Boulenger, 1900 (Bigmouth silverside)
- Chirostoma zirahuen Meek, 1902

== Culinary use ==
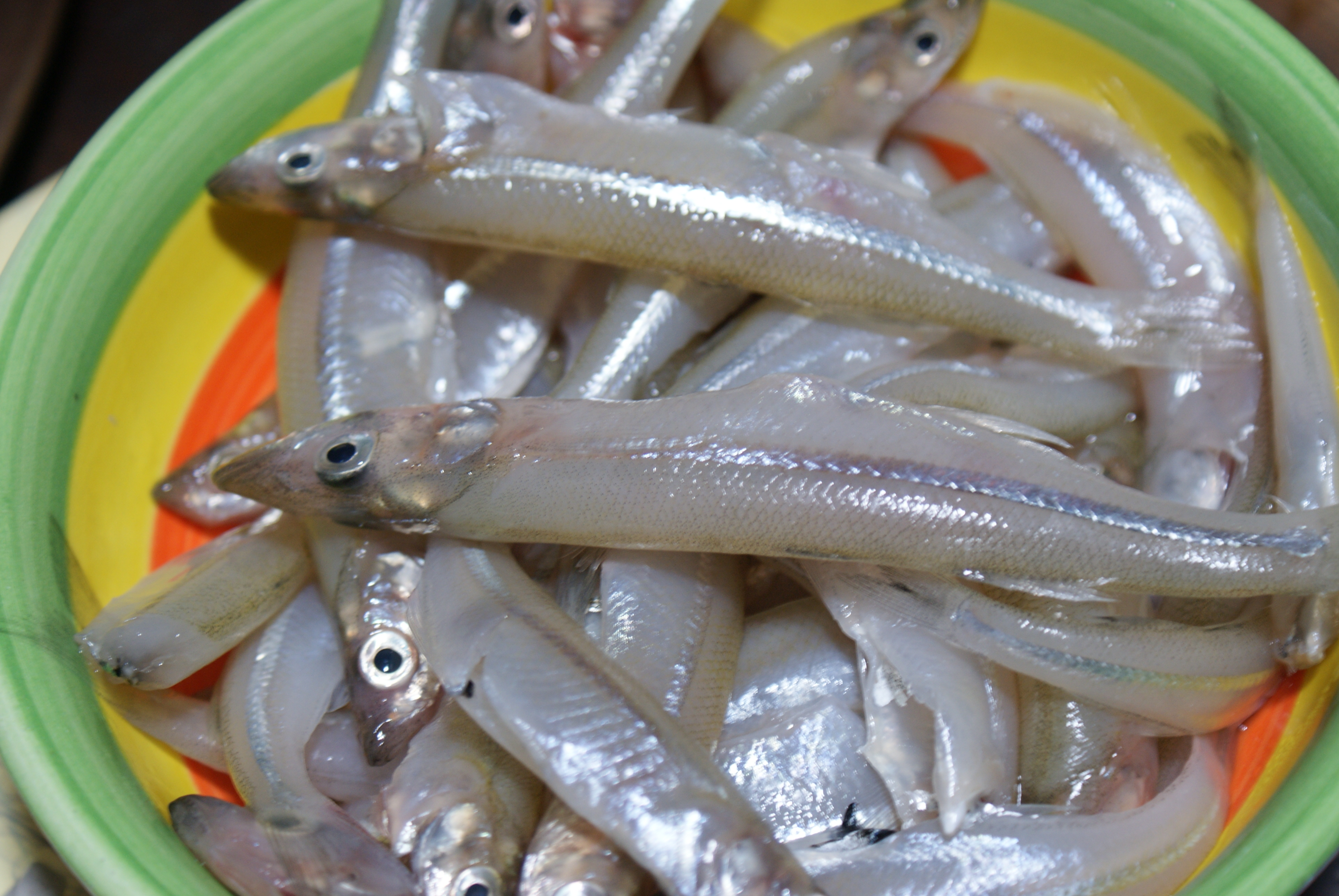
Several Chirostoma from Lake Chapala

Dried Chirostoma can be fried with salt and lemon and covered with fried egg with garlic or chili. They can be added to omelettes or fried pancakes in green sauce.

=== Availability ===
Chirostoma can be purchased at restaurants on the shores of Lake Chapala in local markets. They are typically sold dried and are affordable. C. estor is aquacultured, and C. humboldtianum, another potential candidate for aquaculture, has been bred in captivity.
