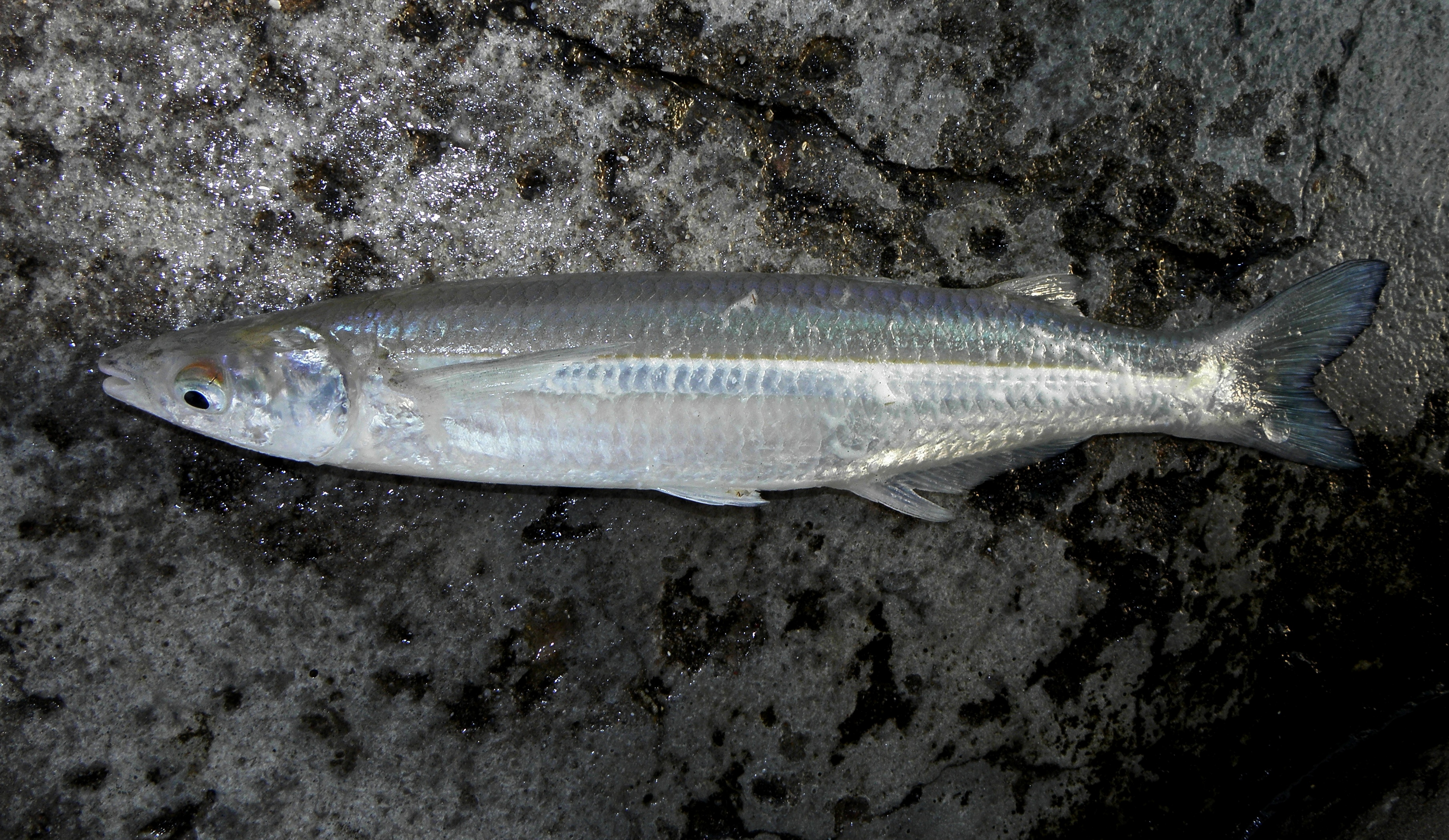
- Odontesthes argentinensis in Mar del Plata, Argentina

Scientific classification
- Kingdom: Animalia
- Phylum: Chordata
- Class: Actinopterygii
- Division: Teleostei
- Order: Atheriniformes
- Family: Atherinopsidae
- Subfamily: Atherinopsinae
- Tribe: Sorgentinini
- Genus: Odontesthes; Evermann & Kendall, 1906

Type species
- Odontesthes perugiae Evermann & Kendall, 1906

= Odontesthes =

Genus of fishes

Odontesthes is a genus of Neotropical silversides. They are found in fresh, brackish and salt water habitats in the southern half of South America (north to Brazil and Peru), as well as the offshore Juan Fernández and Falkland Islands. Additionally, O. bonariensis has been introduced to other continents.

The different Odontesthes species are generally quite similar in their appearance and some have been known to hybridize. Some are commercially important and the target of fisheries.

== Species ==
Several Odontesthes were formerly included in the genus Basilichthys instead. The currently recognized species of Odontesthes are:

- Odontesthes argentinensis (Valenciennes, 1835)
- Odontesthes bicudo L. R. Malabarba & Dyer, 2002
- Odontesthes bonariensis (Valenciennes, 1835) (Argentinian silverside)
- Odontesthes brevianalis (Günther, 1880)
- Odontesthes crossognathos Juliana M. Wingert, Juliano Ferrer, Mayara P. Neves, Dirceu Baumgartner and L. R. Malabarba, 2022.
- Odontesthes gracilis (Steindachner, 1898)
- Odontesthes hatcheri (C. H. Eigenmann, 1909)
- Odontesthes humensis F. de Buen, 1953
- Odontesthes incisa (Jenyns, 1841)
- Odontesthes ledae L. R. Malabarba & Dyer, 2002
- Odontesthes mauleanum (Steindachner, 1896)
- Odontesthes mirinensis Bemvenuti, 1996
- Odontesthes nigricans (J. Richardson, 1848)
- Odontesthes orientalis F. de Buen, 1950
- Odontesthes perugiae Evermann & Kendall, 1906
- Odontesthes piquava L. R. Malabarba & Dyer, 2002
- Odontesthes platensis (C. Berg, 1895)
- Odontesthes regia (Humboldt, 1821) (Chilean silverside)
- Odontesthes retropinnis (F. de Buen, 1953)
- Odontesthes smitti (Lahille, 1929)
- Odontesthes wiebrichi (C. H. Eigenmann, 1928) — validity uncertain
- Odontesthes yucuman Wingert, Ferrer & Malabarba, 2017
