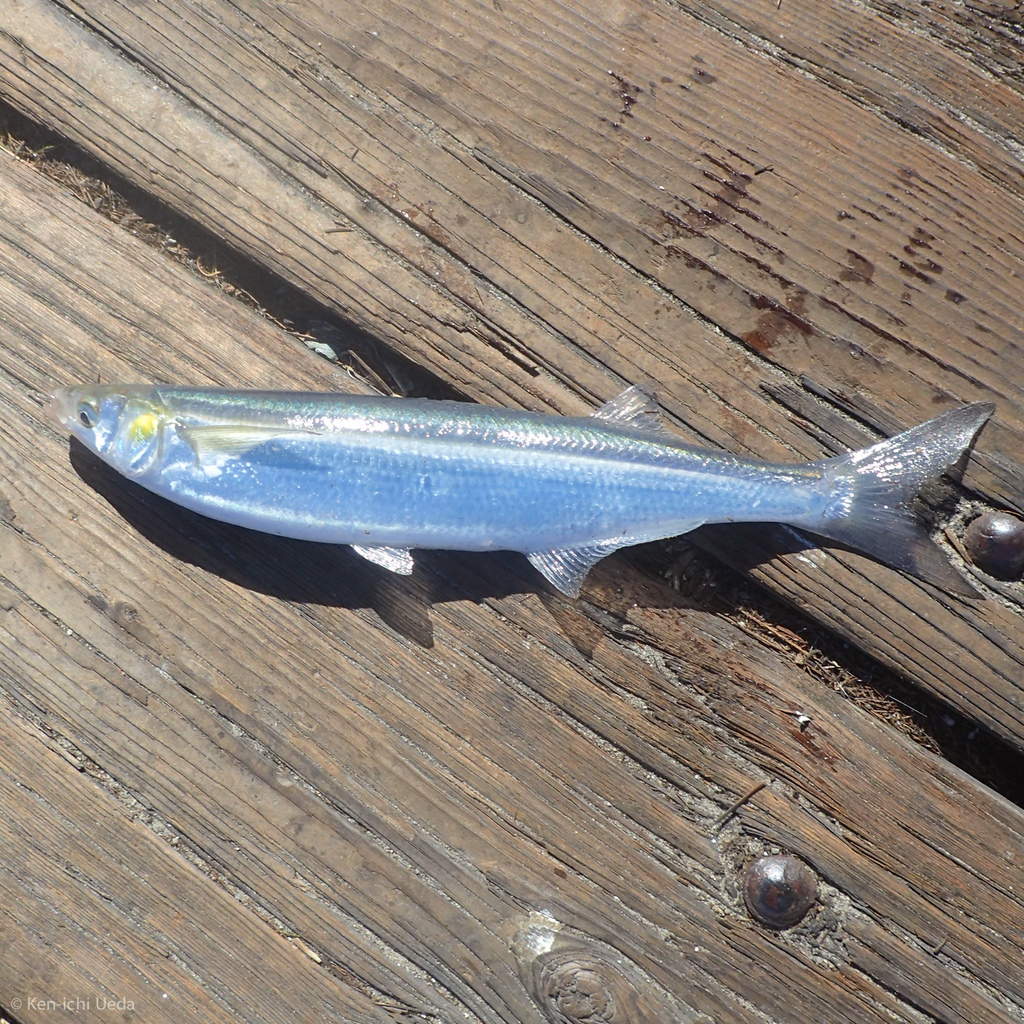

Conservation status
- Least Concern (IUCN 3.1)

Scientific classification
- Kingdom: Animalia
- Phylum: Chordata
- Class: Actinopterygii
- Order: Atheriniformes
- Family: Atherinopsidae
- Subfamily: Atherinopsinae
- Tribe: Atherinopsini
- Genus: Atherinopsis; Girard, 1854
- Species: A. californiensis

Binomial name
- Atherinopsis californiensis Girard, 1854

Synonyms
- Atherinopsis sonorae Osburn & Nichols, 1916; Atherina storeri Ayres, 1854

= Jack silverside =

Species of fish

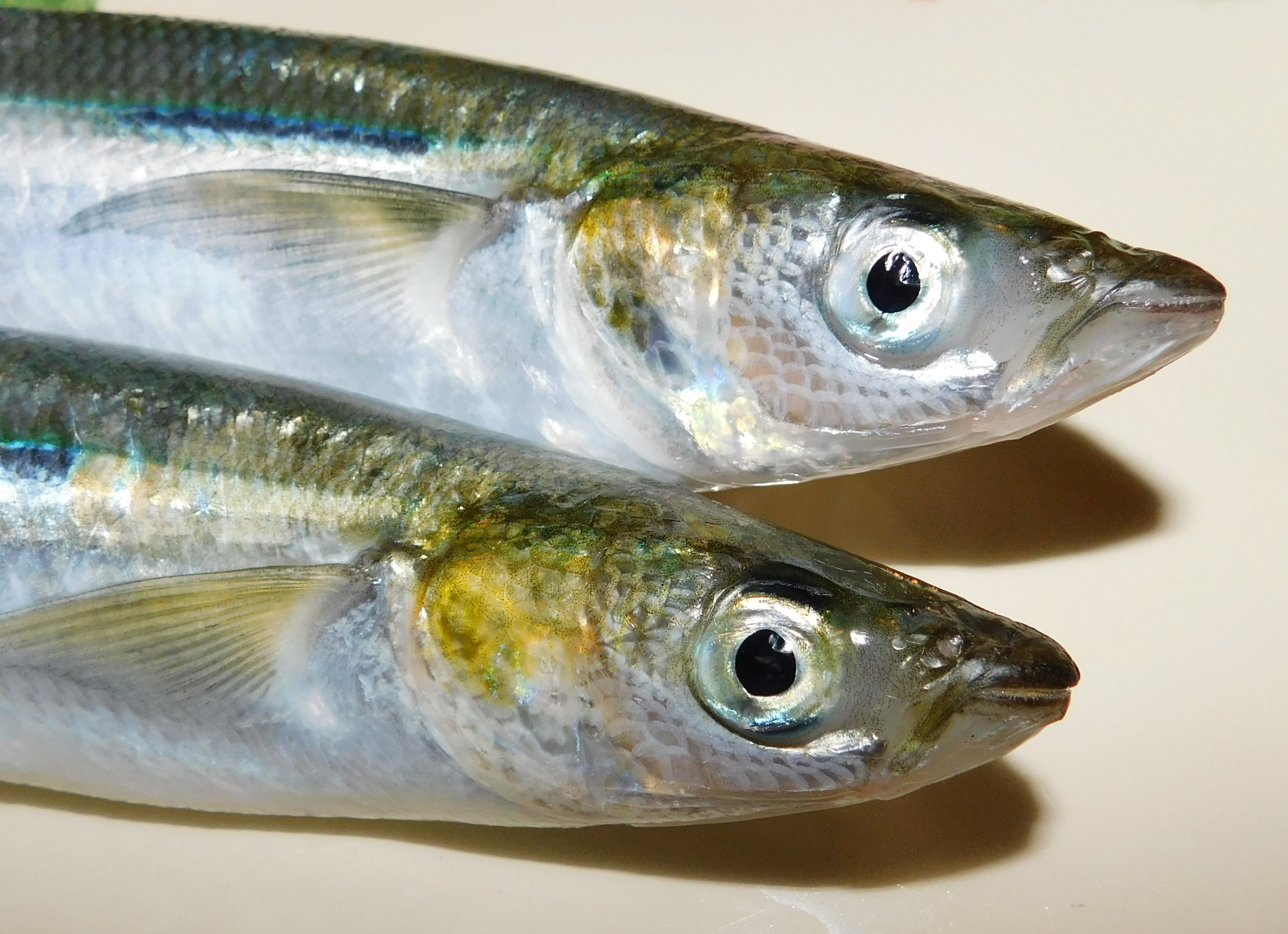
A pair of jacksmelt caught from San Diego

Atherinopsis californiensis, the jack silverside or jacksmelt, is a species of neotropical silverside native to the Pacific coast of North America from Oregon, United States to southern Baja California, Mexico. This species often grows to 49 cm (19 in), but specimens of 55 cm (22 in) in total length have been reported. It is silver throughout the body, with a grey dorsal pattern, and a light silver ventral-lateral, as well as a yellow spot present behind the eye, on the operculum. and is important commercially as a source of human food. It is the only known member of its genus. They are commonly confused with the Atherinops affinis, the topsmelt silverside.

Atherinopsis californiensis is a key element of Pacific coast marine ecosystems. This circumscription reveals its ability to adapt to changing environmental conditions across its distribution in different habitats. The diet and reproductive strategies of Jacksmelt are important to understanding its ecological role in these ecosystems. Additionally, it is recognized that this species has economic value and the need is for sustainable practices to maintain abundance. Conservation efforts to proactively maintain healthy populations of Atherinopsis californiensis that are not chipped, will be important due to continuing threats of overfishing and habitat degradation.

== Distribution ==
Atherinopsis californiensis, commonly known as Jacksmelt, distribution range consists of the Pacific coast from Yaquina Bay, Oregon, south to Bahía Magdalena, Baja California Sur, Mexico.

The adults occur in inshore areas, such as bays. They form schools. This species is a demersal spawners in inshore habitats, it is oviparous and the larvae are planktonic, living at the very surface of the water and feeding on phytoplankton. The eggs are attached to one another and to the substrate by adhesive filaments in the chorion.

This species is closely associated with coastal habitats and is frequently distributed in both marine and estuarine environments. Jacksmelt are most commonly found in shallow waters near sandy beaches and kelp forests, and Jacksmelt often school in large numbers which are easily seen during daytime. The ability of juveniles to adapt to a variety of salinity and environmental conditions is critical to survival as they move from fresh to saltwater habitats at different stages of life. Jacksmelt have the ability to thrive in a variety of environments and can exploit a wide ecological niche, and are a principal part of the coastal marine ecosystem.

Jacksmelt are not confined to open coastal areas and are frequently found in bays and estuaries if they contain food resources. Typically found no deeper than 29 metres (100 ft). The ecological flexibility of Jacksmelt and the significance of these habitats for their life cycle is best demonstrated by the presence of Jacksmelt in many estuaries. Jacksmelt grows and matures, shifting and adapting to its environment, moving along its distribution range.

== Habitat ==
Different habitats that provide food and protection from predators are all habitats that Jacksmelt thrives in. Estuaries where freshwater and saltwater meet; bay areas with plenty of food. Jacksmelt depend especially heavily on kelp forests for shelter and also as hunting grounds for a variety of prey. Kelp canopies provide refuge in otherwise dangerous structures from the larger predators while offering access to food: zooplankton and small fishes. Juvenile Jacksmelt also live on sandy beaches before moving into deeper waters as they mature, along with other kelp forest residents listed earlier. Their development is critically dependent on this habitat transition, which enables them to access different food resources through different life stages. Diversity in habitats is available and important for the health and stability of Jacksmelt populations. Jacksmelt is able to take advantage of both marine and estuarine habitats to increase their chances of survival and reproduction.

== Diet ==
The jacksmelt diet consists mostly of zooplankton, small live fish, and bottom invertebrates. Jacksmelt studies have shown omnivorous feeding habits, though Jacksmeltapes more towards carnivory. However, this dietary preference is influenced by the habitat of these fishes; for example, Jacksmelt in kelp forests tend to consume more small fish than do those in estuarine environments where zooplankton is more abundant. Their ability to adapt their feeding strategies to a changing set of resources is essential to their survival and growth in a changing ecological context. Furthermore, competition for food may affect the diet composition as well as the general health of coastal pelagic fish species.

== Reproduction ==
The typical reproductive pattern of Jacksmelt occurs during late spring and early summer when water temperatures rise. Females and males will congregate in particular areas to spawn, releasing eggs into the plankton where they will fertilize externally. Once hatched, the eggs develop into larvae that drift aboard ocean currents until they drop and find themselves in suitable habitats. A high dispersal rate of offspring in various environments is possible through this reproductive strategy. Jacksmelt shows multiple reproductive events throughout the reproductive season, a strategy that does two things, helping to maintain genetic diversity within populations and increasing resilience to environmental stresses. The timing of their spawning season is crucial and matches up with optimum environmental conditions for the survival of larvae. It has been found that maximum spawning activity, as determined by the day of the year, takes place from January through March when optimal conditions for larval development exist. The success of Jacksmelt's reproductive success depends on habitat health. Healthy estuarine environments are important nursery grounds for juvenile fish; young Jacksmelt need the nursery grounds for adequate food resources and protection from predation during the early life stage. With this in mind, the conservation of these habitats is critical both to the survival of Atherinopsis californiensis and for the maintenance of the coastal ecosystems' overall biodiversity.

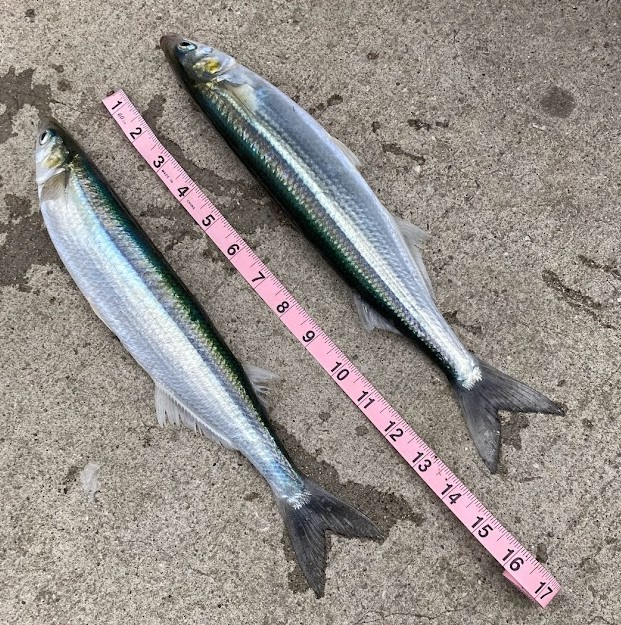
Two 14 in (36 cm) jacksmelt

== Conservation ==
Atherinopsis californiensis is generally considered stable in conservation status, but a variety of threats threaten its populations. Unsustainable fishing practices can result in declines in abundance as declining abundance due to overfishing continues to be a very current and prevalent problem. The natural environments in which Jacksmelt resides are further at threat from degradation due to pollution, and coastal development. Due to the pressure of urbanization and agricultural runoff that can alter water quality and decrease resources available, estuarine habitats are particularly vulnerable. In addition, climate change has long-term implications, as it will alter water temperature and salinity levels needed to reproduce and grow. Correcting these threats will require habitat protection, as well as sustainable fishing practices. Manalention strategies that allow the healthy population of Jacksmelt and continue to preserve its ecological role in coastal ecosystems. Using the information gathered through this research population dynamics and habitat requirements can yet provide further insight into and make a contribution to safeguarding this species through conservation initiatives. Jacksmelt is an economically important fish because it is relevant to commercial fishing and recreation angling. They are harvested by humans for human consumption, and are valued for mild flavor and flaky texture. Jacksmelt are primarily caught incidentally in other fishing activities, however, there has been growing interest in them as a targeted species because of their culinary value. Jacksmelt are also easily consumed by people, and some are used as bait for larger fish species caught in recreational fishing. This dual role underscores the need for sustainable management practices to avoid fishing activities harming Jacksmelt populations.

== Other common names ==
California smelt, blue smelt, horse smelt, peixe rey, pescado del rey, pesce rey, silverside
