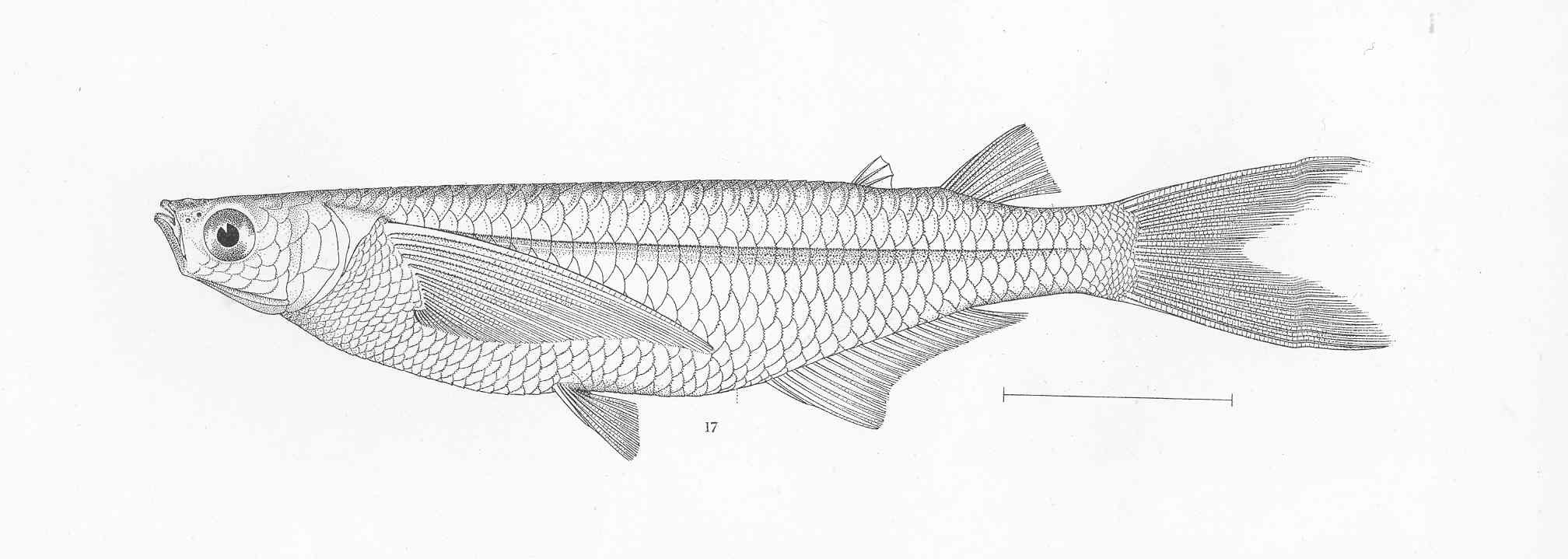
- Atherinella panamensis

Scientific classification
- Kingdom: Animalia
- Phylum: Chordata
- Class: Actinopterygii
- Order: Atheriniformes
- Family: Atherinopsidae
- Tribe: Membranini
- Genus: Atherinella; Steindachner, 1875

Type species
- Atherinella panamensis Steindachner, 1875

= Atherinella =

Genus of fishes

Atherinella is a genus of Neotropical silversides from freshwater, brackish and marine habitats in Mexico, Central America and South America.

== Species ==
The currently recognized species in this genus are:

- Atherinella alvarezi (Díaz-Pardo, 1972) (Gulf silverside)
- Atherinella ammophila Chernoff & R. R. Miller, 1984 (La Palma silverside)
- Atherinella argentea Chernoff, 1986 (moon silverside)
- Atherinella balsana (Meek, 1902) (Balsas silverside)
- Atherinella beani (Meek & Hildebrand, 1923)
- Atherinella blackburni (L. P. Schultz, 1949) (beach silverside)
- Atherinella brasiliensis (Quoy & Gaimard, 1825) (Brazilian silversides)
- Atherinella callida Chernoff, 1986 (cunning silverside)
- Atherinella chagresi (Meek & Hildebrand, 1914)
- Atherinella colombiensis (C. L. Hubbs, 1920)
- Atherinella crystallina (D. S. Jordan & Culver, 1895) (blackfin silverside)
- Atherinella elegans Chernoff, 1986 (Fuerte silverside)
- Atherinella eriarcha D. S. Jordan & C. H. Gilbert, 1882 (longfin silverside)
- Atherinella guatemalensis (Günther, 1864) (Guatemala silverside)
- Atherinella guija (Hildebrand, 1925)
- Atherinella hubbsi (W. A. Bussing, 1979)
- Atherinella jiloaensis (W. A. Bussing, 1979)
- Atherinella lisa (Meek, 1904) (Naked silverside)
- Atherinella marvelae (Chernoff & R. R. Miller, 1982) (Eyipantla silverside)
- Atherinella meeki (N. Miller, 1907)
- Atherinella milleri (W. A. Bussing, 1979)
- Atherinella nepenthe (G. S. Myers & Wade, 1942) (pitcher silverside)
- Atherinella nesiotes (G. S. Myers & Wade, 1942) (broadstripe silverside)
- Atherinella nocturna (G. S. Myers & Wade, 1942)
- Atherinella pachylepis (Günther, 1864) (thickscale silverside)
- Atherinella pallida (Fowler, 1944)
- Atherinella panamensis Steindachner, 1875 (Panama silverside)
- Atherinella pellosemeion Chernoff, 1986 (Mancuernas silverside)
- Atherinella robbersi (Fowler, 1950)
- Atherinella sallei (Regan, 1903) (large-eye silverside)
- Atherinella sardina (Meek, 1907)
- Atherinella schultzi (Álvarez & Carranza, 1952) (Chimalapa silverside)
- Atherinella serrivomer Chernoff, 1986 (bright silverside)
- Atherinella starksi (Meek & Hildebrand, 1923) (star silverside)
- Atherinella venezuelae (C. H. Eigenmann, 1920)
