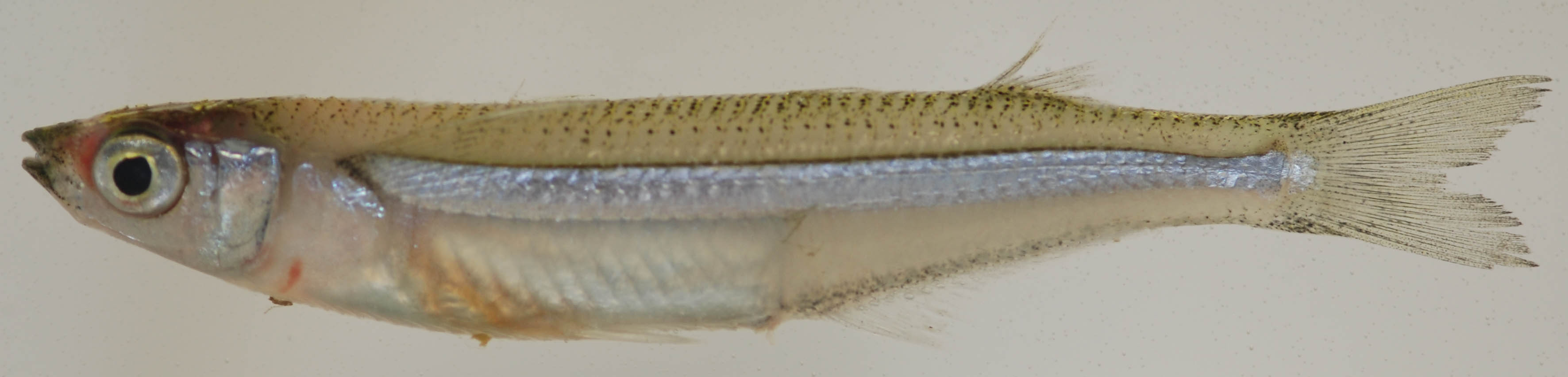
- Membras martinica

Scientific classification
- Kingdom: Animalia
- Phylum: Chordata
- Class: Actinopterygii
- Order: Atheriniformes
- Family: Atherinopsidae
- Subfamily: Menidiinae
- Tribe: Membranini
- Genus: Membras; Bonaparte, 1836

Type species
- Atherina martinica Valenciennes, 1835

= Membras =

Genus of fishes

Membras is a genus of fish, Neotropical silversides, from freshwater, brackish water and marine habitats along coastal parts of the Americas.

== Species ==
There are currently seven recognized species in this genus:

- Membras analis (Schultz, 1948) (Backwaters silverside)
- Membras argentea (Schultz, 1948)
- Membras dissimilis (Carvalho, 1956)
- Membras gilberti (Jordan & Bollman, 1890) (Landia silverside)
- Membras martinica (Valenciennes, 1835) (Rough silverside)
- Membras procera Chernoff, Machado-Allison, Escobedo, Freiburger, Henderson, Hennessy, Kohn, Neri, Parikh, Scobell, Silverstone & Young, 2020
- Membras pygmaea Chernoff, Machado-Allison, Escobedo, Freiburger, Henderson, Hennessy, Kohn, Neri, Parikh, Scobell, Silverstone & Young, 2020
