= Melanorhinus =

Scientific classification
- Kingdom: Animalia
- Phylum: Chordata
- Class: Actinopterygii
- Order: Atheriniformes
- Family: Atherinopsidae
- Tribe: Membranini
- Genus: Melanorhinus; Metzelaar, 1919

Genus of fishes

Melanorhinus is a genus of Neotropical silversides (fish) from the Caribbean Sea and Bahamas.

== Species ==
There are currently three recognized species in this genus:

- Melanorhinus boekei Metzelaar, 1919 (St. Maarten pejerry)
- Melanorhinus cyanellus (Meek & Hildebrand, 1923) (Blackback silverside)
- Melanorhinus microps (Poey, 1860) (Querimana silverside)
