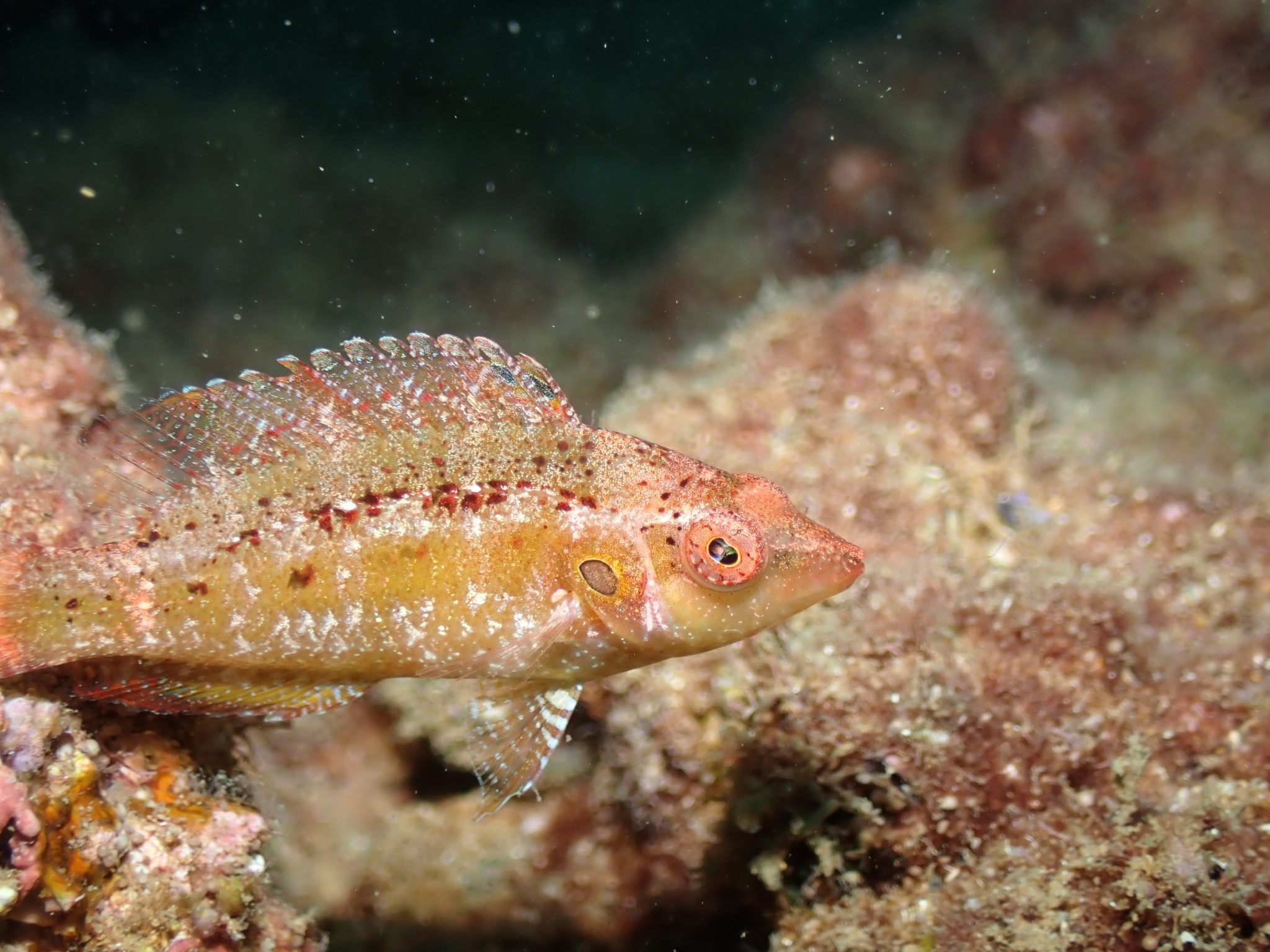

Scientific classification
- Kingdom: Animalia
- Phylum: Chordata
- Class: Actinopterygii
- Division: Teleostei
- Order: Labriformes
- Family: Labridae
- Genus: Pteragogus
- Species: P. trispilus

Binomial name
- Pteragogus trispilus Randall, 2013

= Pteragogus trispilus =

Species of fish

Pteragogus trispilus is a species of marine ray-finned fish from the wrasse family, the Labridae. It is native to the Red Sea from where it has entered the Mediterranean Sea.

== Description ==
Pteragogus trispilus has a compressed body which has a covering of cycloid scales. It has a terminal mouth, its jaws extend as far as the rear of the pupil and are equipped with two pairs of large, recurved caniform teeth at the front of the jaw. The second pair and large and straight. The dorsal fin has 11 spines and 9 soft rays while the anal fin has 3 spines and 9 soft rays. It has a rounded, moderately long caudal fin while there is a lengthened first ray in the pelvic fin. When fresh they are mainly olivaceous in colour with the edges of the scales picked out in white, there is an oblique elliptic shaped black spot on the gill cover, this has wide yellow margins. There is also a vertical white streak on each side of rear edge of the preoperculum. There is a scattering of small black spots behind the eye and on the nape. The pupil is surrounded by orange pigment while the rest of iris with 7 dark lines radiating out from the pupil. The lateral line is marked with black dots and dashes and with white dots. The dorsal, anal, and caudal fins are olivaceous marked with white dots on their rays and slanting white lines on their spiny parts. The lower part of head and rear part of the gill cover in males are suffused with orange. The females sometimes have a whitish stripe running from the front of snout and widening to the diameter of the pupil runs below the lateral lineto the upper part of the caudal peduncle. There can be horizontal rows of white spots on the body to the rear of the base of the pectoral fins, and there may be faint orange spots too. Each of the first three membranes between the anterior spines of the dorsal fin in males has a black spot while there are normally 2 such spots on females, and sometimes a faint third spot. A specimen from Turkey in 2019 was mostly a light brown-reddish in colour. This is a small species of wrasse with the largest males being 7.9 cm in total length.

== Distribution ==
This species is found in the Red Sea, the Gulf of Aqaba and the Gulf of Suez. First recorded in 1992 in the Mediterranean Sea off Israel, following passage through the Suez Canal, it is now commonly observed in Levantine waters.

== Habitat and biology ==
Pteragogus trispilus occurs in areas with a substrate consisting of sand where there are detached clumps of brown algae or they are interspersed with small coral patches and rocks. They are known to feed on foraminifera, small gastropods and crustacean, including small crabs and moderately large shrimp, indicating that it does not feed exclusively on very prey items.

== Taxonomy ==
Pteragogus trispilus was first described by John E. Randall in 2013 with the type locality given as Taba on the Gulf of Aqaba. The initial specimens had been collected during the 1980s and identified as Pteragogus pelycus, the name created by Randall to replace the preoccupied name given to this taxon by Wilhelm Peters, Cossyphus opercularis.
