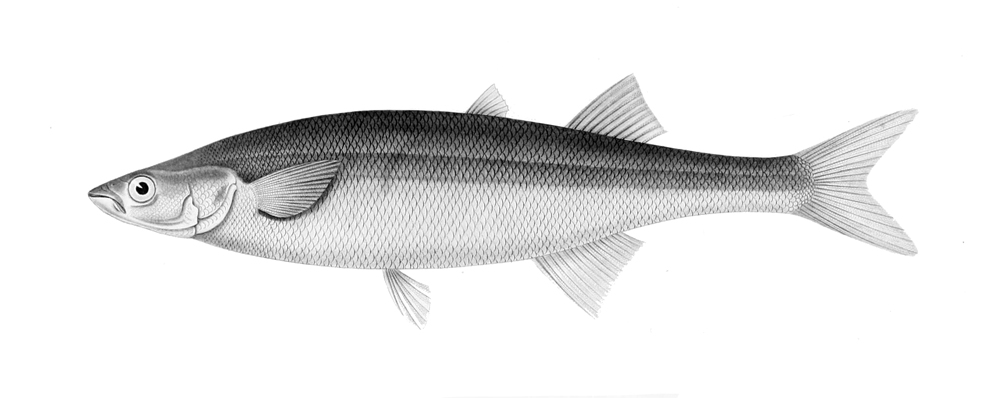
- B. microlepidotus

Scientific classification
- Kingdom: Animalia
- Phylum: Chordata
- Class: Actinopterygii
- Division: Teleostei
- Order: Atheriniformes
- Family: Atherinopsidae
- Tribe: Sorgentinini
- Genus: Basilichthys; Girard, 1855

Type species
- Atherina microlepidota Jenyns, 1841

= Basilichthys =

Genus of fishes

Basilichthys is a genus of Neotropical silversides native to freshwater habitats in Chile and Peru. Many species now placed in Odontesthes were formerly included in Basilichthys instead.

== Species ==
The currently recognized species in this genus are:

- Basilichthys archaeus (Cope, 1878)
- Basilichthys australis C. H. Eigenmann, 1928
- Basilichthys microlepidotus (Jenyns, 1841)
- Basilichthys semotilus (Cope, 1874)
