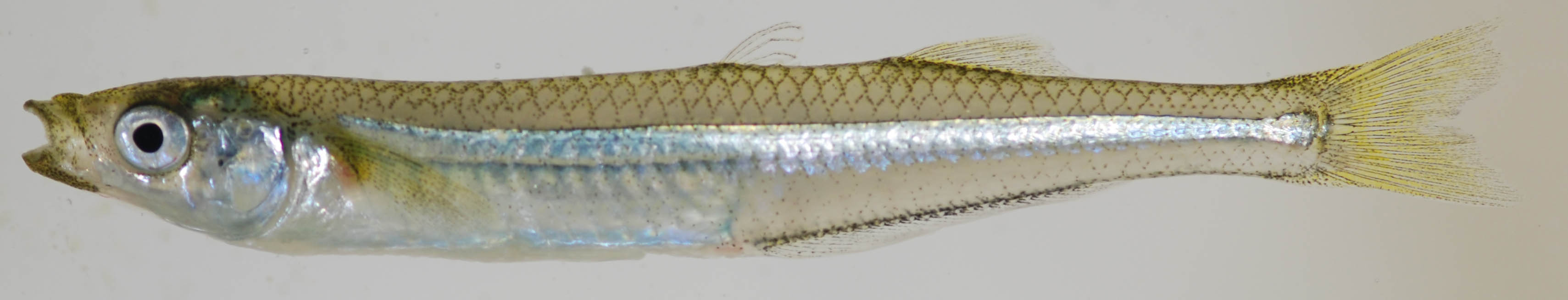
- Menidia menidia

Scientific classification
- Kingdom: Animalia
- Phylum: Chordata
- Class: Actinopterygii
- Order: Atheriniformes
- Family: Atherinopsidae
- Subfamily: Menidiinae; Schultz, 1948

= Menidiinae =

Subfamily of fishes

Menidiinae is a subfamily of the Neotropical silversides, part of the family Atherinopsidae. This subfamily is made up of two tribes, seven genera and around 80 species. They are primarily a tropical subfamily but there are some temperate species, this subfamily is found in both the Atlantic and Pacific Oceans.

== Tribes and genera ==
- Tribe Mendiniini
  - Genus Chirostoma Swainson, 1839
  - Genus Labidesthes Cope, 1870
  - Genus Menidia Bonaparte, 1836
  - Genus Poblana de Buen, 1945
- Tribe Membranini
  - Genus Atherinella Steindachner, 1875
  - Genus Melanorhinus Metzelaar, 1919
  - Genus Membras Bonaparte, 1836
