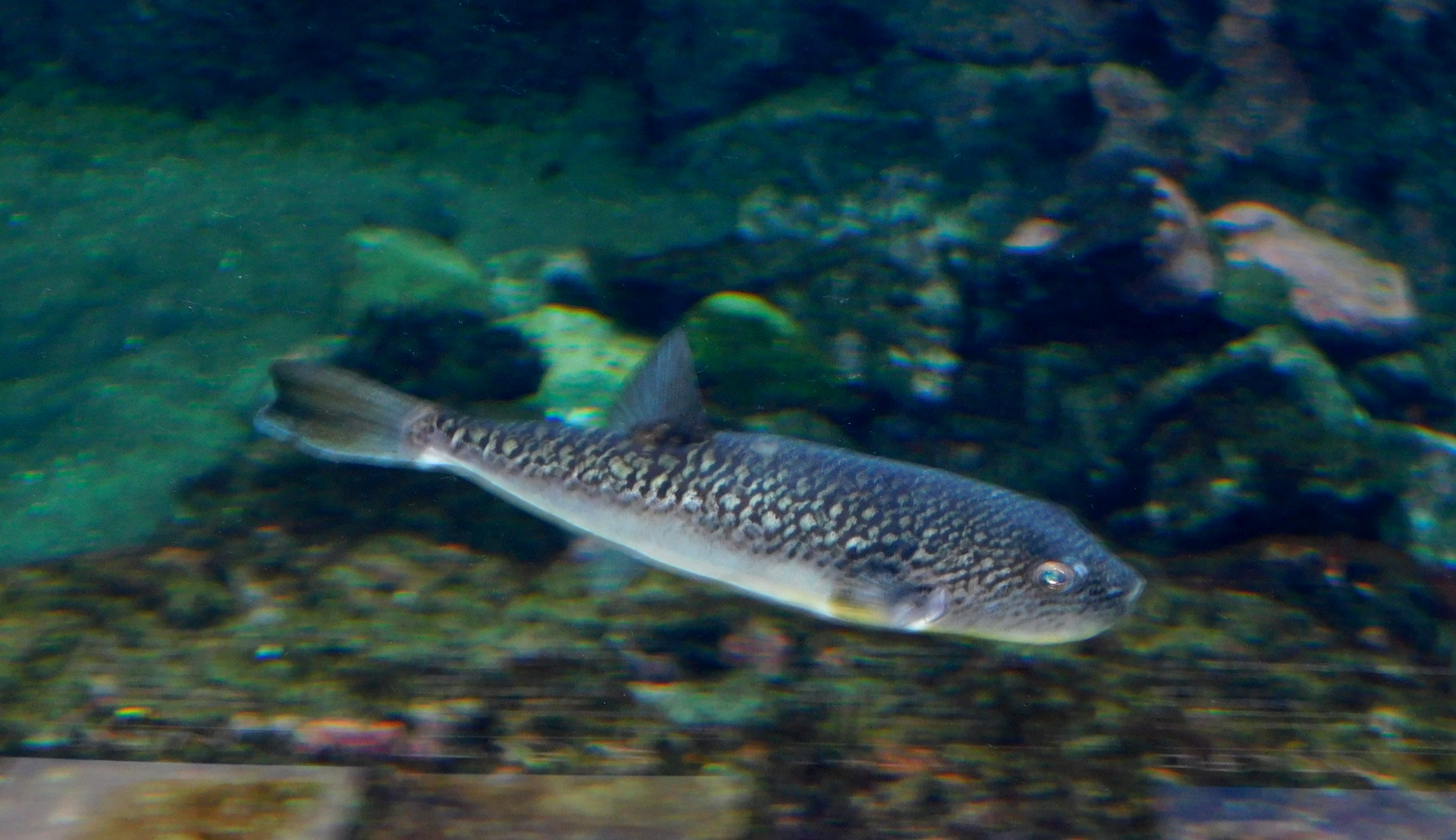

Conservation status
- Least Concern (IUCN 3.1)

Scientific classification
- Kingdom: Animalia
- Phylum: Chordata
- Class: Actinopterygii
- Order: Tetraodontiformes
- Family: Tetraodontidae
- Genus: Takifugu
- Species: T. poecilonotus

Binomial name
- Takifugu poecilonotus (Temminck & Schlegel, 1850)

= Takifugu poecilonotus =

Species of fish

Takifugu poecilonotus, the finepatterned puffer, or Komon-fugu (Japanese: 小紋河豚), is a species of pufferfish, one of 25 in the genus Takifugu. It is found in the northwest Pacific Ocean at shallow depths up to 20 m (66 ft). It contains tetrodotoxin like other members of Takifugu. This species is found in fresh, brackish and saltwater environments.

== See also ==
- Grass puffer
