= Colpichthys =

Scientific classification
- Kingdom: Animalia
- Phylum: Chordata
- Class: Actinopterygii
- Order: Atheriniformes
- Family: Atherinopsidae
- Tribe: Atherinopsini
- Genus: Colpichthys; C. L. Hubbs, 1918

Type species
- Atherinops regis Jenkins & Evermann, 1889

Genus of fishes

Colpichthys is a genus of Neotropical silverside endemic to the Gulf of California.

== Species ==
The currently recognized species in this genus are:

- Colpichthys hubbsi C. B. Crabtree, 1989 (delta silverside)
- Colpichthys regis (O. P. Jenkins & Evermann, 1889) (false grunion)
