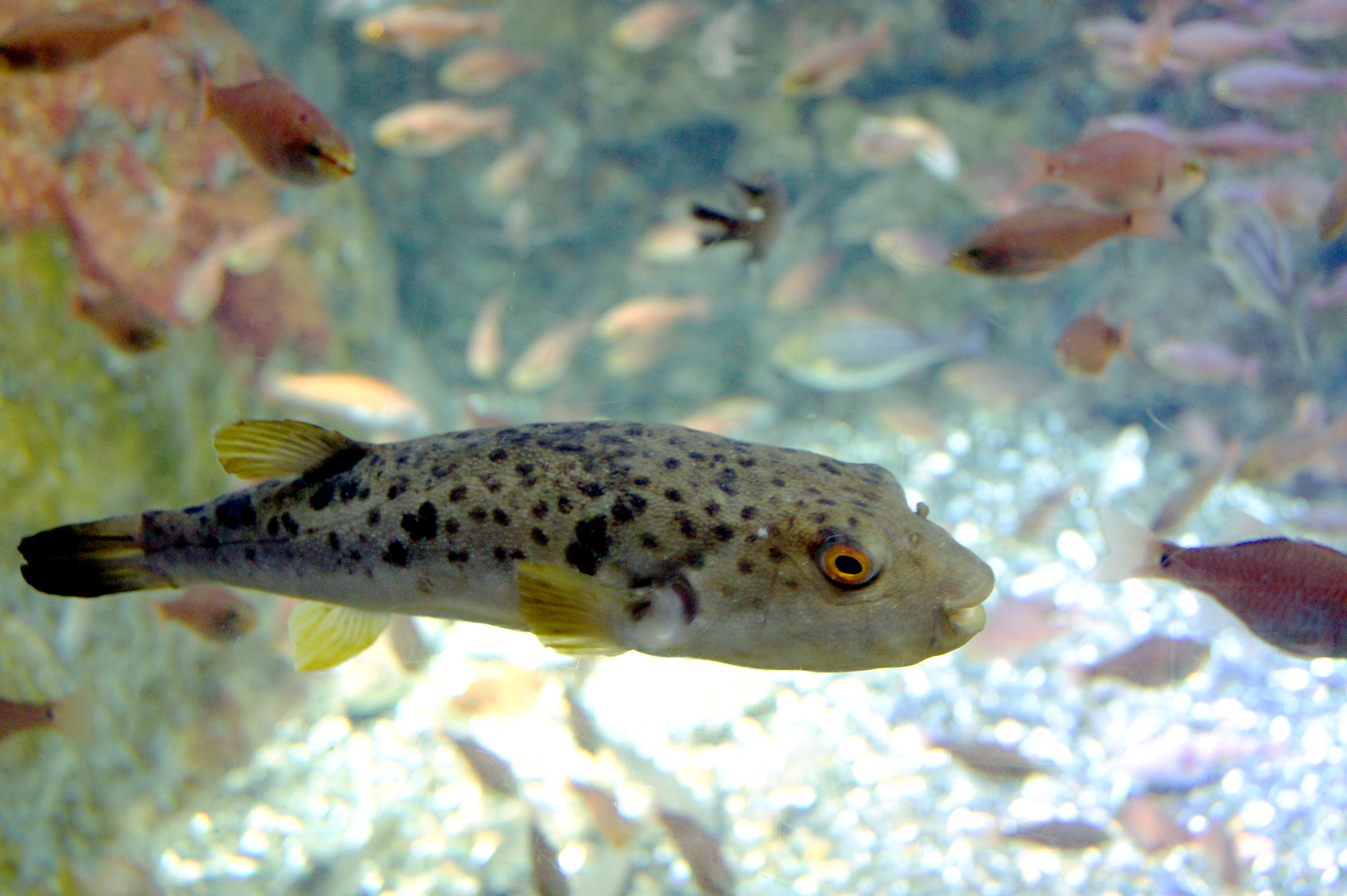

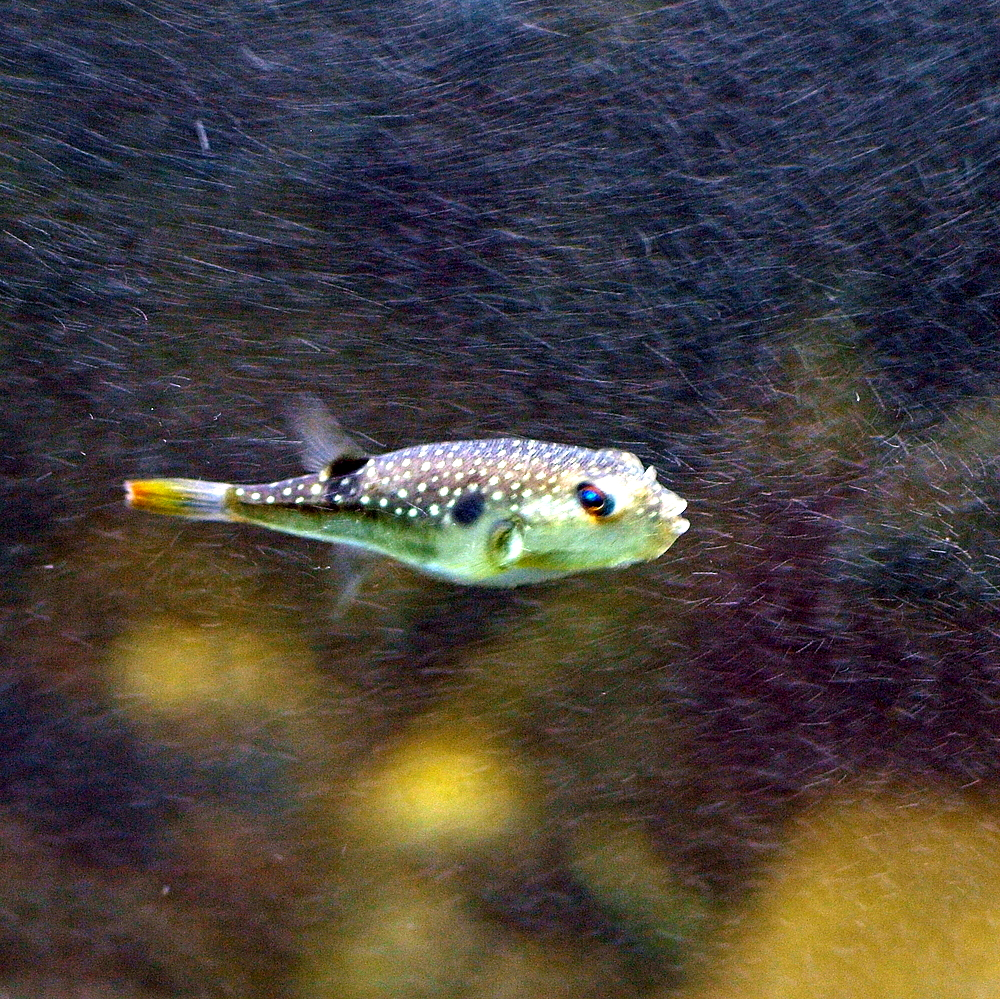

Conservation status
- Least Concern (IUCN 3.1)

Scientific classification
- Kingdom: Animalia
- Phylum: Chordata
- Class: Actinopterygii
- Order: Tetraodontiformes
- Family: Tetraodontidae
- Genus: Takifugu
- Species: T. niphobles

Binomial name
- Takifugu niphobles (D. S. Jordan & Snyder, 1901)

= Grass puffer =

Species of fish

The grass puffer (Takifugu niphobles), or Kusa-fugu (Japanese: 草河豚), is a species of fish in the pufferfish family (Tetraodontidae). This common to abundant species is found in the northwest Pacific Ocean in China (including Hong Kong and Taiwan), Japan, Korea, the Philippines and Vietnam. It is primarily found in coastal waters, ranging to depths of 20 m (66 ft), but is often seen in brackish water and has also been recorded briefly entering freshwater. The grass puffer reaches up to 15 cm (6 in) in length.

== Breeding ==
The grass puffer has a highly unusual breeding behavior where large groups gather seasonally in shallow water along certain beaches during high tide, throw themselves onto land (with the help of an incoming wave) where fertilization occurs, and then return to the water. The fertilized eggs may be swept back to the sea or stay on land under rocks for a period, but in the latter case they only hatch when submerged by water during a later high tide. Such a breeding behavior is not known from any other pufferfish, but is known from the unrelated capelin and grunion.

== Relationship with humans ==
The grass puffer is often caught off beaches, docks, and piers using various baits such as worms, shrimp, sea lice, or cut fish. They are popular for children to catch and even popular as pets, but their intestines contain the extremely potent pufferfish poison tetrodotoxin which is potentially lethal to humans. The species is not specifically targeted, but sometimes taken as part of the fugu fishery.

== See also ==
- finepatterned puffer
