= Barton Appler Bean =

American ichthyologist (1860–1947)

Barton Appler Bean (May 21, 1860, in Lancaster County, Pennsylvania – June 16, 1947, in Chemung, New York) was an American ichthyologist.

He was the brother of the ichthyologist Tarleton Hoffman Bean (1846–1916). He obtained a job at the National Museum of Natural History in Washington in 1881, where he worked for his brother. Barton became assistant in 1886 and assistant curator of the Division of Fishes in 1890. He retained this position until his retirement in 1932. Barton Bean also worked for the United States Fish Commission as an investigator. He died after falling from a bridge.

== See also ==
- Category:Taxa named by Barton Appler Bean

== Taxon named in his honor ==
- Chirostoma bartoni, the Alberca silverside, is a species of neotropical silverside endemic to the Lerma River basin of Mexico.
