= Thompson Van Hyning =

American physician and naturalist

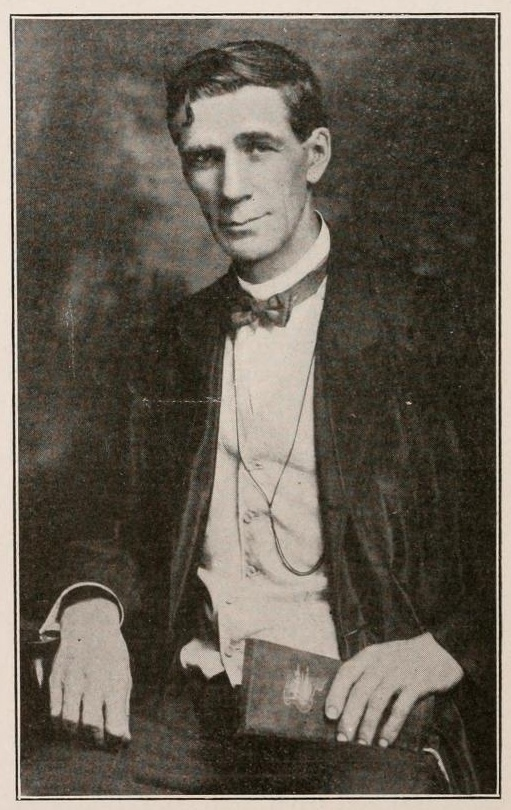
c. 1910

Thompson Van Hyning (24 June 1861 – 15 November 1948) was an American physician and naturalist who contributed to malacology. He helped found and directed the Iowa State Museum from 1910 to 1914 and then moved to Gainesville and directed the Florida State Museum from 1914 to 1947. He played a role in the passing of the bill in 1917 that established the Florida State Museum. He added nearly 15,000 mollusc specimens to the collection before his retirement in 1947. A number of mollusc species have been named from his collections.

Van Hyning worked on a Checklist of the molluscs of Florida but it was never published. Taxa named after Van Hyning include:

- Cerithiopsis vanhyningi Bartsch, 1918
- Conus verrucosus vanhyningi Rehder, 1944
- Cumingia tellinoides vanhyningi Rehder, 1939
- Dinocardium robustum vanhyningi Clench & L.C. Smith, 1944
- Lyogyrus vanhyningi Vanatta, 1934
- Orinella vanhyningi Bartsch, 1944
- Primovula (Pseudosimnia) vanhyningi Maxwell Smith, 1940

His son Oather C. Van Hyning (1901–1973) also became a naturalist with interests in the fishes and reptiles. Oather specialized in the reptiles of Florida and collected extensively, while a student, he was expelled for drinking alcohol from his laboratory and never completed his degree.
