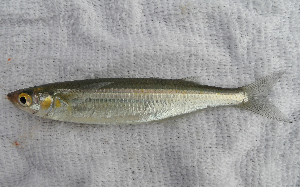

Conservation status
- Least Concern (IUCN 3.1)

Scientific classification
- Kingdom: Animalia
- Phylum: Chordata
- Class: Actinopterygii
- Order: Atheriniformes
- Family: Atherinopsidae
- Subfamily: Atherinopsinae
- Tribe: Atherinopsini
- Genus: Atherinops; Steindachner, 1876
- Species: A. affinis

Binomial name
- Atherinops affinis (Ayres, 1860)

Synonyms
- Atherinopsis affinis Ayres, 1860; Atherinops insularum Gilbert, 1891; Atherinops magdalenae Fowler, 1903; Atherinops oregonia Jordan & Snyder, 1913; Atherinops littoralis Hubbs, 1918; Atherinops cedroscensis Hubbs, 1918; Atherinops guadalupae Hubbs, 1918

= Topsmelt silverside =

Species of fish

The topsmelt silverside (Atherinops affinis), also known as the topsmelt, is a species of Neotropical silverside native to the eastern Pacific Ocean.

== Description ==
The topsmelt silverside is a small, slim fish with a dorsally flattened body which can grow up to a total length of 37 centimetres (15 in). It has two separate dorsal fins on its bright green back which contrasts with the silver to pale flanks and silvery underside. This species has a pointed head with small eyes and a rather rounded, blunt snout and an oblique mouth situated terminally with extendible jaws each equipped with a row of tiny forked teeth. Their gills are a golden-yellow. It has no lateral line but it has 63-65 scales where the lateral line would have been present. The first dorsal fine has 5-9 spines, the second dorsal fin has a single spine and 8-14 rays while the anal fin also has a single spine but has 19-25 rays and the pectoral fin has 13 rays. The juveniles are translucent and have three rows of pigmented scales on their back, becoming scattered on the caudal peduncle.

== Distribution ==
The topsmelt silverside is found in the eastern Pacific along the western coast of North America from Vancouver Island in British Columbia south to Baja California and the Gulf of California.

== Habitat and biology ==
The topsmelt silverside is a pelagic schooling fish which occurs in a wide variety of habitats at different times of the year. It is a common species in estuaries but it has also been recorded along the oceanic shoreline and in kelp forests, off sandy beaches, and sometimes in offshore waters. They can frequently be found in and around man-made structures such as pier pilings. They are frequently observed just below the surface and are most frequently found in the upper 9 metres (30 ft). During spring and summer months many of these fish move into estuaries while in the autumn and winter they move to more open coastlines where there are bays, rocky areas, and beds of kelp. They can tolerate higher salinities than seawater and have been recorded inhabiting in salt evaporation ponds, as high as 80 ppt.

The topsmelt silverside spawn in the warmer months, starting in March and ending in October, preferring to spawn where the salinity is around 30 ppt and the temperature ranges between 13–27 °C (55–81 °F). These fish prefer to spawn at night over submerged vegetation. After hatching in deeper water the larvae may move up the estuary. Juveniles, less than a year old, are the most frequent age class to occur in freshwater environments and as they age they move downstream towards more estuarine environments. The juveniles feed on zooplankton but the adults are more benthic foragers and food items can include algae, chironomid larvae and amphipods, the presence of sand and gravel in the stomach contents being taken to be an indicator of bottom feeding. This species is often recorded leaping out of the water to escape pursuit larger predatory fishes such as mackerel or jacks.
