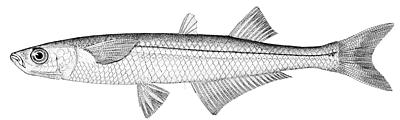
- Menidia sp.

Scientific classification
- Kingdom: Animalia
- Phylum: Chordata
- Class: Actinopterygii
- Order: Atheriniformes
- Family: Atherinopsidae; Fowler, 1903

Sub-families & Genera
- Subfamily Atherinopsinae; Atherinops; Atherinopsis; Basilichthys; Colpichthys; Leuresthes; Odontesthes; Subfamily Menidiinae; Atherinella; Chirostoma; Labidesthes; Melanorhinus; Membras; Menidia; Poblana

= Neotropical silverside =

Family of fishes

The neotropical silversides are a family, Atherinopsidae, of fishes in the order Atheriniformes. About 112 species in 13 genera are distributed throughout the tropical and temperate waters of the New World, including both marine and freshwater habitats. The familiar grunions and Atlantic silverside belong to this family.
