= Menidia audens =

Conservation status
- Least Concern (IUCN 3.1)

- Secure (NatureServe)

Scientific classification
- Kingdom: Animalia
- Phylum: Chordata
- Class: Actinopterygii
- Division: Teleostei
- Order: Atheriniformes
- Family: Atherinopsidae
- Genus: Menidia
- Species: M. audens

Binomial name
- Menidia audens (Hay, 1882)

Species of ray-finned fish

Menidia audens, the Mississippi silverside, is a neotropical silverside native to Central North America, where it is found in east Texas, eastern Mississippi, Oklahoma, Louisiana, Arkansas, Southeast Missouri, southwest Illinois, parts of western Kentucky and Tennessee, and South Central Kansas.

The species has been introduced to California, Central Oklahoma, parts of western Kentucky, much of Tennessee, northeast Mississippi, northern Alabama, northern Georgia, and western North Carolina. Throughout most of its introduced range it is considered invasive and has displaced many native fishes due to competition for food, particularly zooplankton. the Mississippi silverside alongside the Inland silverside likely played a role in the extinction of the Clear lake splittail (Pogonichthys ciscoides), a fish once found in California's Clear lake and its tributaries. The Mississippi silverside has led the decline in populations of several other California native fishes, and has even been found to feed on the young of the endangered Delta smelt (Hypomesus transpacificus). The introduced populations of Mississippi silverside in the Tennessee–Tombigbee Waterway (TTW) following its construction have led to a decline in Brook silverside (Labidesthes sicculus) populations in the area.

Menidia audens is morphologically very similar to the inland silverside (Menidia beryllina) and the tidewater silverside (Menidia peninsulae) and forms a species complex with them. However, it is genetically distinct and almost exclusively inhabitants freshwater unlike the M. beryllina (which usually prefers brackish water) and M. peninsulae (which is more marine).
