= Sacramento splittail =

Conservation status
- Least Concern (IUCN 3.1)

Scientific classification
- Kingdom: Animalia
- Phylum: Chordata
- Class: Actinopterygii
- Order: Cypriniformes
- Family: Leuciscidae
- Subfamily: Pogonichthyinae
- Genus: Pogonichthys
- Species: P. macrolepidotus

Binomial name
- Pogonichthys macrolepidotus (Ayres, 1854)

Synonyms
- Leuciscus macrolepidotus Ayres, 1854; Pogonichthys inaequilobus Baird & Girard, 1854; Pogonichthys argyreiosus Girard, 1854

Species of fish

The splittail (Pogonichthys macrolepidotus), also called Sacramento splittail, is a species of freshwater ray-finned fish belonging to the family Leuciscidae, the shiners, daces and minnows. This fish is native to the low-elevation waters of the Central Valley in California. It was first described by William O. Ayres in 1854. It is the sole living member of its genus, the Clear Lake splittail P. ciscoides having become extinct in the 1970s.

== Description ==
The distinctive feature of the splittail is the larger upper lobe of its caudal fin, which is almost twice as long as the head. The tail is deeply forked and very large. The head is slightly conical with a relatively large eye, and there are tiny barbels at the corners of the mouth. The lateral line is slightly decurved. The dorsal fin has 9–10 rays, while the pectoral fins have 16–19 rays, the pelvic fin 8–9 rays, and the anal fin 7–9 rays. The color is silver on the sides, with a dusky olive gray on the back. During the breeding season, the fins pick up a red-orange tinge, and the males become darker and develop white tubercles on the head and at the bases of the fins.

== Lifestyle ==
The Sacramento splittail is a semi-anadromous fish, meaning it spends parts of its life both in the ocean and in freshwater. In their adult lives, splittail spend summer and fall living in low-to-moderate salinity waters and migrate to freshwater rivers and floodplains in the winter and spring. Floodplains are important spawning locations for these fish, with larger floodplains providing more food resources and habitat availability. Splittail are relatively large and long-lived, averaging an 8-year lifespan. They act as prey for other predatory fishes, such as striped bass (Morone saxatilis), as well as aquatic birds.

Splittail rely on both their eyesight and lateral line to sense and avoid obstacles in the environment. They especially utilize their lateral line in low-light conditions.

== Diet ==
Splittail are bottom feeders, consuming bottom-dwelling invertebrates and detritus, generally in areas of low to moderate current. In Suisun Bay, opossum shrimp (mostly Neomysis mercedis), amphipods such as Corophium, and copepods are favorite foods, while in the Sacramento Delta they eat clams, crustaceans, and insect larvae. During periods of high water levels (February/March), splittails will move into flooded areas to look for earthworms.

== Reproductive biology ==
Both male and female Sacramento Splittail usually become sexually mature by their second winter. In some cases, males may mature earlier than females. Their gonads increase in size from autumn to spring, reaching their largest sizes around April. At this time, ovaries account for 18% of the body weight in females, while testes account for less than 2% of male body weight. Splittails are highly fecund, and fecundity increases with the length and width of the fish. Large females are capable of releasing over 100,000 eggs a season. Spawning occurs around April and May, with new, free-swimming fish developing in May and June. The fish may rely on increasing water temperatures and day length to determine when to begin spawning.

== Range ==
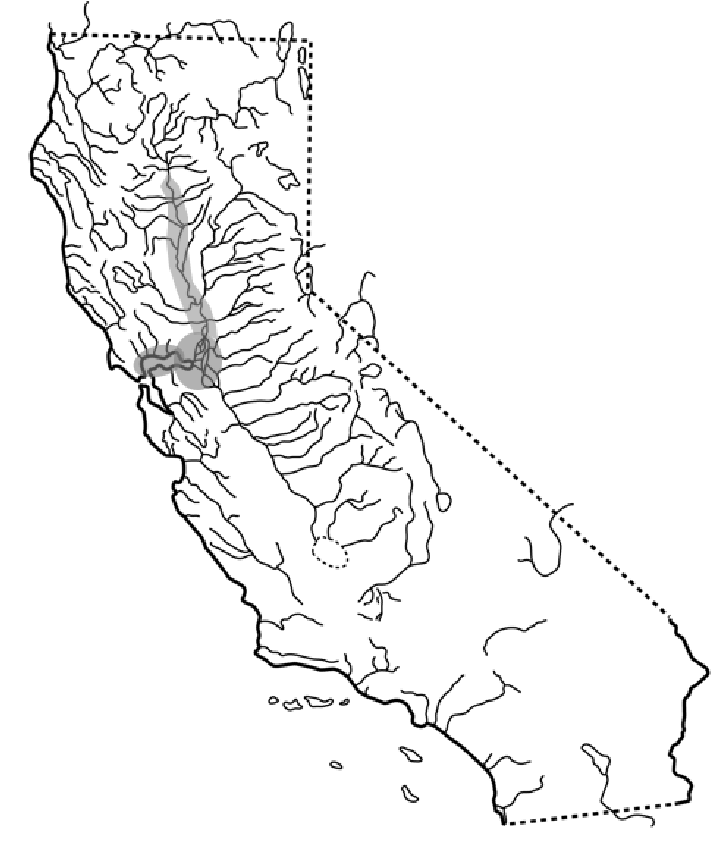
Figure shows the distribution of Sacramento splittail (Pogonichthys macrolepidotus)

Their range is the lower-elevation waters of the Central Valley, extending to San Francisco Bay. Although once found as far north as Redding, they are now only rarely seen in the upper Sacramento River. They were once caught from southern San Francisco Bay and in Coyote Creek (Santa Clara County), but are now restricted to the Sacramento Delta, Suisun Bay, and the lower parts of Sonoma Creek, Petaluma River and Napa River. They are tolerant of moderate levels of salinity and/or alkalinity, often being found in brackish sloughs. This distinguishes the splittail from most other cyprinids, which can only live in freshwater.

== Human use ==
Splittail are not highly sought-after, as they are not considered game nor are they readily abundant. However, because they are favored prey of striped bass, fishers will often use them as bait.

== Conservation concerns ==
=== Spawning ===
Sacramento splittail are found in the lower Sacramento-San Joaquin Delta and the Sacramento River, a small part of their original distribution. Their population sizes vary wildly between years depending on the amount of rainfall. Unfavorable environmental conditions, such as high salinity and low water levels, can greatly affect whether or not they spawn.

=== Distinct populations ===
The spittail has two distinct populations separated genetically, one in the Central Valley and one in the San Pablo area. The San Pablo splittail migrate through high salinity waters in the San Francisco Estuary to reach its spawning location, while Central Valley splittail only encounter relatively low salinity. Because of this, the Central Valley splittail may encounter more difficulty than the San Pablo splittail if their habitat were to become more saline, making whole-species management difficult.

=== Threats ===
There are various threats, both natural and human-caused, which affect splittail.

The cyanobacteria Microcystis is present in the San Francisco Estuary where populations of splittail occur. When cyanobacteria blooms occur, they release toxins that can be harmful to wildlife and humans. Although a direct connection with Microcystis's presence and the decline of splittail has not been established, their toxins were found to have a negative effect on splittail's nutritional status.

Agricultural pesticide use in the Central Valley, where the Sacramento-San Joaquin Delta is located, has been noted to lead to runoff contamination of water. This chemical runoff is toxic to animals that live in the delta, including splittail.

== Status ==
Splittail were reclassified as a species of special concern by the U.S. Fish and Wildlife Service on September 22, 2003, from their prior classification as threatened due to litigation. In 2010, the FWS found that the splittail did not warrant listing under the Endangered Species Act. The Central Valley's system of sloughs and backwaters maintained by annual flooding has greatly changed. The cause of the decline of this species is under investigation. IUCN previously classified the splittail as endangered, but the status was downgraded to least concern in 2013.
