= Atriplex depressa =

Conservation status
- Imperiled (NatureServe)

Scientific classification
- Kingdom: Plantae
- Clade: Tracheophytes
- Clade: Angiosperms
- Clade: Eudicots
- Order: Caryophyllales
- Family: Amaranthaceae
- Genus: Atriplex
- Species: A. depressa

Binomial name
- Atriplex depressa Jeps.

Species of flowering plant

Atriplex depressa is a species of saltbush known by the common names brittlescale and depressed orache. It is sometimes treated as a variety of Atriplex parishii.

It is endemic to the Central Valley of California, where it grows in areas with saline and alkaline soils.

This is a small annual herb producing low-lying stems up to about 20 centimeters long. It is whitish and scaly and brittle. The scaly white leaves are oval to heart-shaped, pointed, and less than a centimeter long each. The inflorescences hold male or female flowers, which are small, hard clusters of flowers. Can be found at elevations up to 320 meters, blooms between May and October.
