= Stockton Arch =

Geologic feature underlying the Central Valley in California

- Stratum
- Location: Central Valley in California

The Stockton Arch is a geologic feature underlying the Central Valley in California in the vicinity of the delta of the Sacramento and San Joaquin Rivers, near the city of Stockton. The Stockton Arch is an upwarping of the crust beneath the thick sediments of the Central Valley, and is regarded as the subsurface separation between the Sacramento River basin and the San Joaquin River basin.
