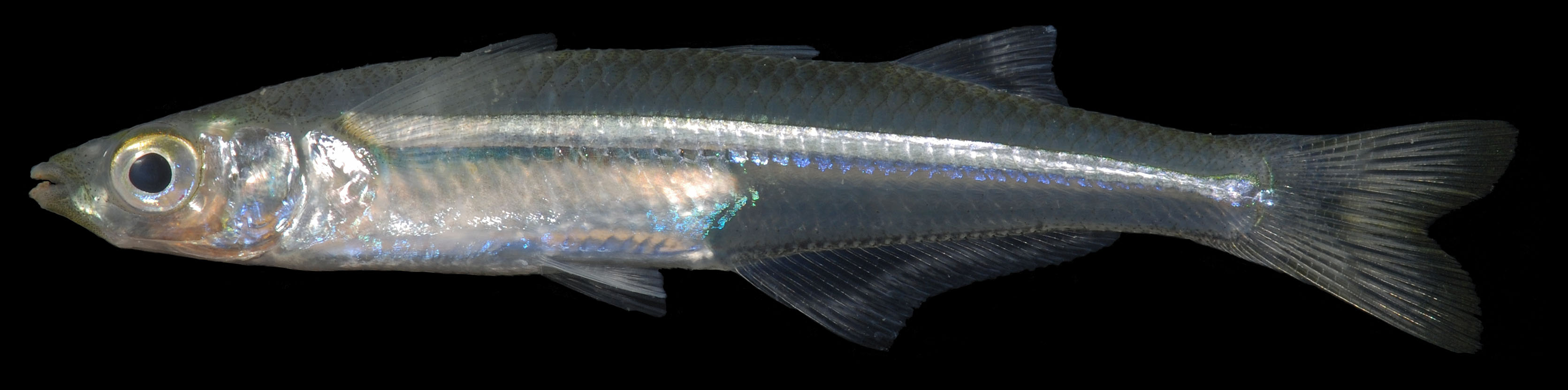

Conservation status
- Least Concern (IUCN 3.1)

Scientific classification
- Kingdom: Animalia
- Phylum: Chordata
- Class: Actinopterygii
- Division: Teleostei
- Order: Atheriniformes
- Family: Atherinopsidae
- Genus: Menidia
- Species: M. menidia

Binomial name
- Menidia menidia (Linnaeus, 1766)

Synonyms
- Atherina menidia Linnaeus, 1766; Atherina notata Mitchill, 1815; Menidia notata (Mitchill, 1815); Atherina viridescens Mitchill, 1815; Atherina boscii Valenciennes, 1835; Menidia dentex Goode & Bean, 1882; Phoxargyrea dayi Fowler, 1903

= Atlantic silverside =

Species of fish

The Atlantic silverside (Menidia menidia), also known as spearing in the northeastern United States, is a small species of fish that is one of the most abundant fish species present in estuarine habitats along the Atlantic coast of North America. It is a common subject of scientific research because of its sensitivity to environmental changes. According to the IUCN Red List, this species is stable and has no major threats to its populations, so it is marked Least Concern. Despite being an extremely common species, most individuals die after one year once they migrate offshore, but a few will make it to two years. The fish is mostly translucent, with white coloring on the anterior end of the body and brown speckling on the top of the head, the posterior scales on the back, and near the jaw. A distinctive silver band runs the length of the fish, next to the lateral line. Their mouths are large compared to other Menidia species, and their first dorsal fins are placed more posteriorly than other silversides.

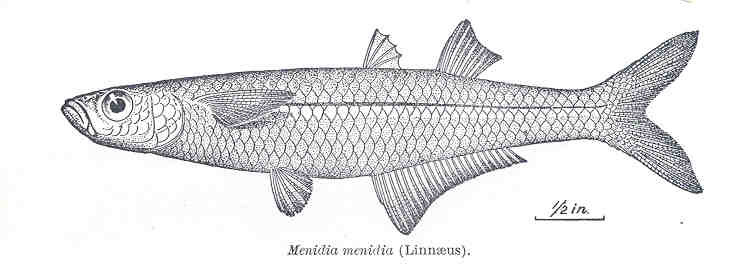
A scientific illustration of Menidia menidia.

== Taxonomy and evolution ==
Atlantic silversides belong to the Atherinopsidae family and the Menidia genus. These fishes are distinguished from other similar species by their rounder and less compressed bodies. Order Atheriniformes includes six families of similar smaller silver fishes, that range from freshwater to marine habitats. The genus Kirtlandia was previously thought to be a part of Menidia but has since been separated. Members of the Kirtlandia genus have thicker and glossier scales and are typically found in the Chesapeake Bay region. The genus Menidia is characterized by their broad silver stripe running down each side and has a similar appearance to Osmeridae. They are often mistaken as members of Osmeridae; however, silversides do not have an adipose fin and instead have one spiny and one soft dorsal fin.

== Distribution ==
The Atlantic silverside is found in the West Atlantic, ranging from the Gulf of St. Lawrence in Canada to northeastern Florida in the USA. It is one of the most common fish in the Chesapeake Bay and in the Barnegat Bay. Recent studies have found that their range may reach farther north than previously thought, as juvenile members of this species were found north of the Laurentian Channel in beach seines.

== Human uses ==
These small fish are a delicacy in some countries like Portugal and are either eaten raw or fried in batter. They are also a common bait fish used by fishermen. This species also serves as a great example of environmental sex determination (ESD) in juvenile fishes, and many studies have been conducted on the topic. While northern populations are controlled only by genetics, southern populations are influenced by environmental conditions.

== Habitat and diet ==
Silversides will eat a wide variety of prey items. Because of their smaller size (about 5–9 centimetres (2.0–3.5 in)), they are restricted to smaller prey such as copepods, mysids, cumaceans, barnacle larvae, and amphipods. Inshore and offshore silversides overall have a very similar diet, however offshore silversides tend to have a more diverse diet, likely due to availability of different types of prey. During the summer months when silversides are more present inshore, copepods are the dominant prey choice, and they tend to feed higher in the water column. However, in winter when silversides are farther out into the ocean, they tend to feed lower in the water column near the ocean floor. So offshore silversides predominately feed on epibenthic mysids.

The abiotic factors the Atlantic silverside needs to survive varies for populations of fish based on their geographical location. They can tolerate an average temperature of 70 °F (21 °C), a salt content of the water ranging from 0 to 37 parts per thousand (ppt), and a well-mixed body of water to prevent hypoxic conditions. Individuals have been found in salinities as low as two ppt, but they prefer salinities of at least twelve ppt. They are also eurythermal, meaning that they can tolerate a large range of temperatures.

The Atlantic silverside's habitat is generally near the water's edge. They are mostly found swimming in brackish waters, such as in the mouths of rivers and streams that connect to the ocean. These small schooling fish have been seen to gather in seagrass beds, which can harbor the nearly defenseless fish some form of shelter from predation as well as provide safe haven for spawning. During winter, most Atlantic silversides swim in deeper water to avoid low temperatures. During the summer, most are found in the shallows along the shoreline.

The major defense of this fish is to hide in seagrass beds. They are quick swimmers and their coloration of silver and a little white makes it confusing to predators to determine the direction the fish are heading. The silverside's strongest form of defense is the strength-in-numbers strategy, where fish will school in large numbers to reduce the likelihood of individual predation. The Atlantic silverside's predators are larger predatory fish – striped bass, blue fish, Atlantic mackerel – and many water birds, including egrets, terns, cormorants, and gulls. Some predators feed specifically on silverside larvae when they first emerge, including semipalmated sandpipers, ruddy turnstones, and blue crabs.

== Life cycle and reproduction ==
Atlantic silversides live most of their lives in brackish waters but will travel more inland toward freshwater and estuarine systems to reproduce and spawn. Cordgrass is the preferred spawning substrate, and spawning only occurs during daytime. Once they reach sexual maturity, both male and female Atlantic silversides will develop their gonads seasonally. Spawning occurs from April to June but can be as early as March and as late as August, depending on the latitude. Reproductive activity is influenced by water temperature, as they must be warm enough for spawning and egg development. 16 °C (61 °F) is the minimum temperature required for spawning, while the optimal temperatures for larvae and egg development are between 17 and 20 °C (63 and 68 °F), respectively. Eggs will incubate for about seven to fifteen days, depending on how warm the water is. Larval emergence occurs after incubation is complete, and larvae will emerge and travel downstream in large groups. To evade predation, larval silversides will emerge during nighttime high tides. In this species, the sex of larvae is determined both by genetics and the temperature of the water in which their eggs were laid in. Populations close to the equator tend to be affected by temperature, with higher proportions of males occurring at higher temperatures. Populations of Atlantic silversides in northern latitudes have evolved to not be affected by environmental sex determination, and thus sex is only driven by genetic factors.
