= Key silverside =

Conservation status
- Endangered (IUCN 3.1)

Scientific classification
- Kingdom: Animalia
- Phylum: Chordata
- Class: Actinopterygii
- Order: Atheriniformes
- Family: Atherinopsidae
- Genus: Menidia
- Species: M. conchorum

Binomial name
- Menidia conchorum Hildebrand & Ginsburg, 1927

Fish endemic to the Florida Keys

The Key silverside (Menidia conchorum) is a species of fish in the family Atherinopsidae: Menidiinae. It is endemic to the Florida Keys.

The American Fisheries Society (2023) and Eschmeyer's Catalog of Fishes (2023) both verify Menidia conchorum as a distinct species. Research by authorities such as Robins and Ray (1986), Gilbert (1992), Conover et al. (2000), and Musick et al. (2000) supports its classification, establishing it as genetically and morphologically unique from related species. Population genetics studies (O'Leary et al., 2016) further confirm its status as a valid species, distinguishing it through genetic and morphological analyses.

Since the 1980s, Menidia conchorum populations have faced a significant decline, predominantly due to the rapid disappearance of their habitat in the salt-ponded waters of the lower Florida Keys and, more importantly, due to the effect of rising sea levels. The Florida Fish and Wildlife Conservation Commission recently cataloged the species as threatened. The U.S. National Marine Fisheries Service has also identified the species as a Species of Concern.

== Species description ==
First documented comprehensively in Getter's 1981 survey of the Florida Keys, M. conchorum is confined to inland salt ponds and small lagoons. This distinctive habitat supports an assemblage of fishes, many of them rare or restricted to these environments.

The range extends from Long Key through the Lower Keys, with verified populations at Big Pine, Cudjoe, Sugarloaf, Saddle Bunch, and Boca Chica Keys (FWC, 2011a; FNAI, 2023). Historic Key West populations have been extirpated.

Morphologically, the Key silverside is the smallest Menidia: females reach up to ~58 mm standard length, males ~50 mm. Compared with the tidewater silverside (M. peninsulae), it exhibits a deeper body, yellow pigmentation, and strict restriction to inland salt ponds. Laboratory experiments also show a reduced cold tolerance, emphasizing its evolutionary confinement to subtropical waters.

== Conservation ==
=== Habitat loss and sea-level rise ===
Pond habitats are degrading rapidly due to development, hurricanes, and hydrological modification. Accelerated sea-level rise is projected to eliminate ~89% of transitional pond habitat by 2100 (Getter, 2011). Broader climate impact assessments highlight the Florida Keys as among the most vulnerable regions of the state (Stys et al., 2017).

=== Extirpation and fragmentation ===
Key West populations are gone, and fewer than two dozen ponds still support the species. Historically larger lagoon populations have collapsed, leaving scattered fragments (FNAI, 2023; Getter, in prep., 2025).

=== Genetic risks and interbreeding ===
O'Leary et al. (2016) documented reduced genetic diversity and drift in fragmented subpopulations. While interbreeding with M. peninsulae remains possible, it has not been demonstrated.

=== Detection and monitoring challenges ===
Salt ponds are often obscured by mangrove cover and are difficult to survey due to accessibility and jurisdictional constraints (Getter, 1981; FWC, 2011b).

== Reclassification Debate ==
Arguments for Critically Endangered: Near-total projected habitat loss, genetic bottlenecks, collapse of lagoon populations, and extirpations.

Counterarguments: Some researchers have noted lingering taxonomic uncertainty, suggesting that M. conchorum may represent an ecotype of M. peninsulae rather than a distinct species, though this interpretation remains debated (Baumann Lab, 2016). Other factors include low detectability and the abundance of related silversides in adjacent habitats.

Consensus: Irrespective of taxonomic debates, the pond-obligate form faces extreme extinction risk and requires urgent conservation.

== Status Reviews ==
Dr. Chuck Getter, who has been studying the species since the 1970s for his doctoral dissertation (Ecology and survival of the Key silverside, Menidia conchorum, an atherinid fish endemic to the Florida Keys, Ph.D., University of Miami, Rosenstiel School of Marine and Atmospheric Sciences), is currently conducting further research on this species (Getter 2009, 2010). This ongoing work involves updating his initial study with new data in preparation for publication in 2025. Despite challenges, the Key silverside plays an irreplaceable role in its ecosystem. As one of the few species adapted to the fluctuating salinity and temperatures of the Florida Keys' ponds and lagoons, it contributes to these unique habitats' biodiversity and ecological resilience. The Florida Fish and Wildlife Conservation Commission classifies the Key silverside as "Threatened," recommending it be prioritized for conservation efforts. The preservation of this species is not just a matter of preventing extinction but also of maintaining the ecological integrity of the Florida Keys' rare and fragile habitats.

Efforts to conserve the Key silverside align with broader conservation goals in the Florida Keys, where protecting unique species like M. conchorum is critical in the face of rising sea levels and other climate-related threats. The ongoing work by scientists and conservation organizations underscores the importance of proactive measures to protect this species, which, if successful, could serve as a model for preserving other threatened species in similarly vulnerable environments.

Institutional and policy constraints. Florida policymakers historically resisted integrating climate change into biodiversity policy (Korten, 2015). Federal agencies have delayed listing climate-threatened taxa such as the Keys mole skink, only reconsidering under litigation pressure (WLRN, 2020). NGOs, including the Center for Biological Diversity (CBD, 2025), continue to push for stronger federal action.

Thus, the Key silverside represents both a biological rarity and a test case for climate adaptation in conservation law.

== Conservation Recommendations ==
1. Secure remaining ponds through acquisition and conservation easements (FWC, 2011a).
2. Install culverts or barriers that sustain semi-isolation without tidal flushing (FWC, 2011b).
3. Prevent pond freshening to maintain salinity regimes (Getter, 1981).
4. Conduct systematic monitoring with repeat-station surveys (FNAI, 2023).
5. Pursue genetic rescue strategies, including propagation or translocation (O'Leary et al., 2016).
6. Establish inland pond refugia above projected sea-level thresholds (Stys et al., 2017).

== Concluding Recommendation for Refugia and Assisted Translocation ==
Carrying forward the discussion on conservation recommendation 6 above, and because the Key silverside (Menidia conchorum) is restricted to low-lying inland salt ponds of the lower Florida Keys, it is considered highly vulnerable to sea-level rise and saltwater intrusion. Modeling conducted by the Florida Fish and Wildlife Conservation Commission (FWC) projected an ~89% loss of suitable transition-zone habitat by the end of the 21st century, largely from pond breaching and subsequent invasion by predators and competitors.

Adaptation strategies for similarly restricted Keys endemics have included creating inland refugia above projected sea-level thresholds. Stys et al. (2017) noted that assisted relocation and engineered refugia are already being explored for rare plants such as the Key tree cactus and proposed that semi-isolated basins or constructed ponds at higher elevations could provide long-term refugia for narrowly distributed taxa. Within this framework, inland brackish pond refugia have been recommended as a potential conservation action for M. conchorum, complementing ongoing efforts to protect and manage its existing habitat.

== Annotated Bibliography ==
Collette, B., Grubbs, D., Pezold, F., Simons, J., Caruso, J., Carlson, J., McEachran, J.D., Brenner, J., Tornabene, L., Chakrabarty, P., Robertson, R., Chao, L., Vega-Cendejas, M., Tolan, J., Carpenter, K.E., Munroe, T., Jelks, H., & Espinosa-Perez, H. (2015). Menidia conchorum. IUCN Red List of Threatened Species. 2015: e.T13145A512306. https://doi.org/10.2305/IUCN.UK.2015-4.RLTS.T13145A512306.en.

→ This is the authoritative global conservation assessment for M. conchorum, classifying it as Endangered. It provides population data, habitat requirements, and threats, forming the baseline for conservation policy and research.

American Fisheries Society. (2023). Common and Scientific Names of Fishes from the United States, Canada, and Mexico (8th ed.). Bethesda, MD: AFS.

→ Provides standardized nomenclature for North American fishes. It affirms the taxonomic validity of M. conchorum, making it a critical reference for consistency in scientific and policy documents.

Baumann Environmental Fish Ecology Lab. (2016, January 19). Species or Ecotype? The curious case of the Key silverside (Menidia conchorum). University of Connecticut, Department of Marine Sciences. Retrieved from https://befel.marinesciences.uconn.edu/2016/01/19/new-publication-species-or-ecotype-the-curious-case-of-the-key-silverside-menidia-conchorum

→ This research group blog post summarizes O'Leary et al. (2016) and places it in the broader context of whether M. conchorum represents a distinct species or an ecotype of Menidia peninsulae. It is not peer-reviewed, but it provides accessible interpretation and discussion of the scientific debate. Useful as a secondary source to illustrate how the controversy is understood by the scientific community and communicated beyond academia.

Bloom, D. D., Egan, J. P., & Kinziger, A. P. (2009). Systematics and biogeography of Menidiini based on mitochondrial ND2 and nuclear S7 data. Copeia, 2009(3), 408–417.

→ Molecular phylogeny of the silverside tribe Menidiini. Demonstrates genetic divergence within the group, supporting the distinctiveness of M. conchorum relative to congeners.

Center for Biological Diversity. (2025). CBD lawsuit over Florida Keys species listings. Press release.

→ Advocacy source documenting legal action to compel federal protection of Florida Keys taxa. Illustrates institutional pressures driving recognition of M. conchorum as climate-vulnerable.

Conover, D. O., Munch, S., & Lankford, T. E. Jr. (2000). Current status of the Key silverside, Menidia conchorum, in southern Florida. U.S. Geological Survey report.

→ Field-based assessment of the species' distribution and habitat use in southern Florida. Highlights its restriction to inland salt ponds and threats from habitat modification.

Duggins, C. F. (1986). Systematics of the Key silverside, Menidia conchorum. Tulane Studies in Zoology and Botany, 25, 133–150.

→ Provides early taxonomic analysis of M. conchorum. Offers morphological distinctions from closely related silversides.

Florida Fish and Wildlife Conservation Commission (FWC). (2011a). Biological Status Review for the Key Silverside. Tallahassee, FL.

→ State-level assessment supporting the designation of M. conchorum as Threatened in Florida. Serves as the primary reference for state conservation actions.

Eschmeyer's Catalog of Fishes. (2023). California Academy of Sciences. Retrieved July 6, 2023. https://researcharchive.calacademy.org/research/ichthyology/catalog/fishcatmain.asp

→ Definitive global online catalog confirming taxonomic status of fish species, including M. conchorum. Used for taxonomic verification.

Florida Fish and Wildlife Conservation Commission (FWC). (2011b). Supplemental Information for the Key Silverside Biological Status Review Report. Tallahassee, FL.

→ Provides additional ecological and habitat details complementing the main Biological Status Review. Useful for conservation planning.

Florida Natural Areas Inventory (FNAI). (2023). Field Guide to the Key Silverside (Menidia conchorum). Tallahassee, FL.

→ Field identification guide with updated distribution records. Key resource for monitoring programs.

Getter, C. D. (1981). Ecology and survival of the Key silverside, Menidia conchorum, an atherinid fish endemic to the Florida Keys. Ph.D. Dissertation, University of Miami.

→ Foundational ecological study. Defines habitat use, population biology, and threats to M. conchorum.

Getter, C. D. (2009). Monitoring sea level rise impacts in mangroves and lagoonal ecosystems of the lower Florida Keys. Paper presented at the Florida Keys Sea Level Rise Conference, Duck Key, Florida.

→ An early assessment linked sea-level rise to habitat vulnerability. This provides regional context for pond ecosystems where M. conchorum occurs.

Getter, C. D. (2010). Fishes of transitional marine habitats of the lower Florida Keys: Projected impact of accelerated sea-level rise. Retrieved from ResearchGate.

→ Discusses projected ecological shifts in transitional habitats. Includes implications for species like M. conchorum.

Getter, C. D. (2011). Peer review and supplemental analysis for the Key silverside BSR. Florida Fish and Wildlife Conservation Commission.

→ Technical review of state-level status assessment. Offers refinements and validation of earlier findings.

Gilbert, C. R. (1992). Key Silverside Menidia conchorum. In Rare and Endangered Biota of Florida, Vol. II: Fishes, pp. 213–217. Gainesville: University Press of Florida.

→ Classic reference on rare Florida fishes. Offers an authoritative natural history description.

International Union for Conservation of Nature (IUCN). (2014). Menidia conchorum. The IUCN Red List of Threatened Species 2014.

→ Earlier global assessment preceding the 2015 version. Useful for tracing conservation status changes.

Korten, T. (2015, March 8). Rick Scott's ban on "climate change" language. Miami Herald.

→ Journalistic account of Florida's climate policy environment. Demonstrates institutional barriers to species protection.

Musick, J. A., Harbin, M. M., Berkeley, S. A., Burgess, G. H., Eklund, A. M., Findley, L., Gilmore, R. G., Godden, J. T., Ha, D. S., Huntsman, G. R., McGovern, J. C., Parker, S. J., Poss, S. G., Sala, E., Schmidt, T. W., Sedberry, G. R., Weeks, H., & Wright, S. G. (2000). Marine, estuarine, and diadromous fish stocks at risk of extinction in North America. Fisheries, 25(11), 6–30.

→ Comprehensive review identifying at-risk fish taxa in North America. Includes M. conchorum as a vulnerable species.

NatureServe. (2023). Menidia conchorum – NatureServe Explorer. Arlington, VA.

→ Database entry providing conservation status, distribution, and habitat information. Widely used in U.S. conservation assessments.

O'Leary, S. J., Martinez, C. M., Baumann, H., Abercrombie, D. L., et al. (2016). Population genetics and geometric morphometrics of the Key silverside, Menidia conchorum. Bulletin of Marine Science, 92(4), 453–470. https://doi.org/10.5343/bms.2016.1003

→ Key genetic study demonstrating low diversity and population fragmentation. Provides strong evidence for conservation urgency.

Page, L. M., Espinosa-Pérez, H., Findley, L. D., Gilbert, C. R., Lea, R. N., Mandrak, N. E., Mayden, R. L., & Nelson, J. S. (2013). Common and scientific names of fishes from the United States, Canada, and Mexico (7th ed.). Bethesda, MD: AFS.

→ Predecessor to the 2023 AFS edition. Confirms nomenclature and validates taxonomic placement.

Robins, C. R., & Ray, G. C. (1986). A field guide to Atlantic coast fishes of North America. Peterson Field Guide Series. Boston: Houghton Mifflin.

→ General field guide covering many species, including M. conchorum. Important for morphological comparison.

Ross, M. S., O'Brien, J. J., Ford, R. G., Zhang, K., & Morkill, A. (2009). Disturbance and the rising tide: The challenge of biodiversity management on low-island ecosystems. Frontiers in Ecology and the Environment, 7(9), 471–478. https://doi.org/10.1890/070221

→ Modeling study on sea-level rise impacts in Florida Keys ecosystems. Relevant to understanding long-term risks to pond specialists like M. conchorum.

Stys, B., Kautz, R., Langtimm, C. A., & Hipes, D. (2017). Climate change impacts on Florida's biodiversity and ecology. In J. W. Jones, V. Misra, & J. J. Obeysekera (Eds.), Florida's Climate: Changes, Variations, and Impacts (pp. 215–256). Gainesville: Florida Climate Institute.

→ Authoritative synthesis on biodiversity impacts from climate change in Florida. Provides context for threats to M. conchorum.

WLRN. (2020, January 15). Sea rise is threatening to wipe out the Keys mole skink. WLRN Public Media.

→ Regional news source illustrating the broader pattern of sea-level rise impacts on Florida Keys endemic species. Contextual support for conservation urgency.
