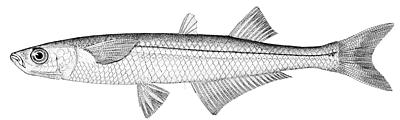
- Menidia menidia

Scientific classification
- Kingdom: Animalia
- Phylum: Chordata
- Class: Actinopterygii
- Order: Atheriniformes
- Family: Atherinopsidae
- Subfamily: Menidiinae
- Tribe: Mendiniini
- Genus: Menidia; Bonaparte, 1836

Type species
- Atherina menidia Linnaeus, 1766

Synonyms
- Argyrea De Kay, 1842; Ischnomembras Fowler, 1903; Menidiella Schultz, 1948; Phoxargyrea Fowler, 1903

= Menidia =

Menidia Temporal range: Pliocene to Present

Genus of fishes

Menidia is a genus of Neotropical silversides native to freshwater, brackish and marine habitats along the Atlantic and Gulf of Mexico coasts of North America, ranging from the Gulf of Saint Lawrence in Canada to the Yucatán Peninsula in Mexico. The species M. clarkhubbsi, an all-female species, reproduces asexually.

== Species ==
There are currently eight recognized species in this genus:

- Menidia audens Hay, 1882 (Mississippi silverside)
- Menidia beryllina (Cope, 1867) (Inland silverside)
- Menidia clarkhubbsi A. A. Echelle & Mosier, 1982 (Texas silverside)
- Menidia colei C. L. Hubbs, 1936 (Golden silverside)
- Menidia conchorum Hildebrand & Ginsburg, 1927 (Key silverside)
- Menidia extensa C. L. Hubbs & Raney, 1946 (Waccamaw silverside)
- Menidia menidia (Linnaeus, 1766) (Atlantic silverside)
- Menidia peninsulae (Goode & T. H. Bean, 1879) (Tidewater silverside)
