= Pogonichthys =

- Sacramento splittail (Pogonichthys macrolepidotus)

Scientific classification
- Kingdom: Animalia
- Phylum: Chordata
- Class: Actinopterygii
- Order: Cypriniformes
- Family: Leuciscidae
- Subfamily: Pogonichthyinae
- Genus: Pogonichthys; Girard, 1854

Type species
- Pogonichthys inaequilobus Baird & Girard, 1854

Synonyms
- Symmetrurus Jordan, 1878

Genus of fishes

Pogonichthys, the splitails, is a genus of freshwater ray-finned fish belonging to the family Leuciscidae, the shiners, daces and minnows. These fishes are native to western North America.

The common name is inspired by the distinctive appearance of the tail fin, in which the upper lobe is distinctly larger.

Of the two species, only the Sacramento splittail survives; the Clear Lake splittail became extinct in the mid-1970s.

== Species ==
Pogonichthys contains the following species:

- †Pogonichthys ciscoides Hopkirk, 1974 (Clear Lake splittail)
- Pogonichthys macrolepidotus (Ayres, 1854) (Sacramento splittail)
