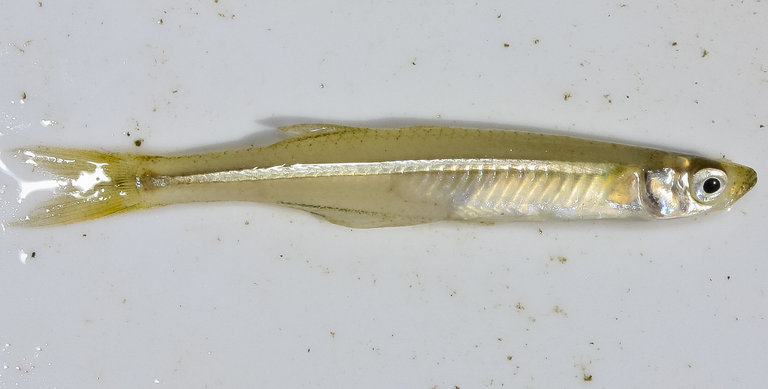

Conservation status
- Least Concern (IUCN 3.1)

Scientific classification
- Kingdom: Animalia
- Phylum: Chordata
- Class: Actinopterygii
- Order: Atheriniformes
- Family: Atherinopsidae
- Genus: Menidia
- Species: M. beryllina

Binomial name
- Menidia beryllina (Cope, 1867)

Synonyms
- Chirostoma beryllinum Cope, 1867; Atherinichthys gracilis Günther, 1861; Menidia beryllina cerea Kendall, 1902; Ischnomembras gabunensis Fowler, 1903

= Inland silverside =

Species of fish

The inland silverside (Menidia beryllina) is a neotropical silverside native to eastern North America, and introduced into California. It is a fish of estuaries and freshwater environments.

Inland silversides are quite elongate even for silverside, with lengths six to seven times depth. They have large eyes, a considerably upturned mouth, and a head noticeably flattened on top. Of the two widely separated dorsal fins, the anterior fin is small and has four to five weak spines, while the posterior fin is larger, with one spine and eight or nine rays. The lengthy anal fin is somewhat sickle-shaped, has one spine and 16 to 18 rays. As befits the name, they are silvery on the sides; the back is somewhat yellow, and the underside is a translucent green. These are small fish, with 15 cm recorded, but most adults 10 cm or less.

They primarily feed on zooplankton, moving in enormous schools capable of depleting populations of the small arthropods and crustaceans they favor. In turn, they are prey for a variety of fish and birds. The silversides congregate in the shallows, generally over sand or gravel bottoms with overhead cover if possible, but then move out to open water in search of additional food, which increases predation risk. They are often observed in a sort of daily migration pattern as a result.

The exact native range of the inland silverside is not known; they are widespread along the Atlantic coast from Maine to Florida, and along the Gulf of Mexico. In the Mississippi River they can be found in backwaters and reservoirs as far north as Missouri and Illinois, hundreds of miles inland.

They were introduced into Clear Lake and the Blue Lakes of California in 1967, in order to control the Clear Lake gnat Chaoborus asticopus and midges, and in lakes and reservoirs of Alameda County and Santa Clara County the following year. From there they spread into the San Francisco Bay and Central Valley, and have since become widespread in central California. In some areas, they are the most abundant fish of any species. Peter Moyle suggests that this fish may have contributed to the demise of the Clear Lake splittail, although the effect of the silversides' introduction on California ecosystems not been much studied.

Inland silversides are currently an EPA approved indicator species for acute marine aquatic toxicity testing and short-term chronic toxicity estimating of marine and estuarine organisms. Due to their susceptibility to stormwater and heavy metal pollution, inland silversides are often used as an indicator for watershed health, as a study of an introduced population in San Diego, CA found that even 5–10% effluent concentration of pollutants could cause abnormal embryo and larval development. Elevated levels of pollutants, often due to the inflow of stormwater, have been found to cause increased egg mortality. Furthermore, exposure to pollutants such as cadmium, chromium, and copper can cause abnormal inflation of the swim bladder leading to buoyancy and locomotion issues, affecting individual's ability to feed, which can lead to sharp declines in population. Other developmental consequences of exposure to heavy metals and other pollutants include spinal curvature, reduced body size, and different eye sizes. Compared to other species in the estuarine and river environments, inland silversides often display adverse effects to far lower concentrations of pollutants, emphasizing their susceptibility to the influx of chemical and heavy metal pollutants.

Along with their susceptibility to chemical pollutants, inland silverside embryos exhibit negative effects when exposed to pathogenic funguses, such as Beaveria bassiana. Beaveria bassiana is an insecticide pathogenic fungus used in agricultural pest control that is usually nontoxic to nontarget vertebrates. Beaveria bassiana has been found to degrade inland silverside embryos eventually leading to embryo deaths. Extracellular enzymes secreted by the fungus are able to digest proteins of the chorion, the outermost layer, of the embryo, eventually causing the chorion to rupture, instantly killing the embryo. Unlike exposure to chemical pollutants, exposure to the fungus led to immediate death rather than developmental abnormalities, as toxins secreted by fungus quickly digests the proteins of the embryos. These adverse reaction to Beaveria bassiana further indicate the sensitivity of inland silversides to foreign pollutants and microorganisms.

Inland silversides, Menidia beryllina, have distinct spawning behavior throughout their range, with individuals in the northern range exhibiting a unimodal spawning season between May and July and those in the southern range displaying either a bimodal spawning season, often spawning in the spring and again in the early fall. Inland silversides are dependent on water temperature for spawning, with both the initiation and cessation of spawning occurring within similar temperature ranges throughout their geographical range. Spawning is initiated when water temperatures are between 13.5 and 17.0 °C (56.3 and 62.6 °F) and spawning ends when water temperature rises to 27.0 to 32.4 °C (80.6 to 90.3 °F). Many populations, especially those in Texas and Florida, are r-strategists, producing high numbers of offspring, but displaying little if any parental care. Along with a lack of parental care, this strategy also includes rapid sexual maturation and reproduction at a young age. Growth rates in female individuals have been observed to be far greater than those of males with juvenile females growing between 0.31mm/day – 0.34mm/day and juvenile males growing between 0.20mm/day – 0.27mm/day.

== General references ==
- "Menidia beryllina". Integrated Taxonomic Information System.
- Moyle, P. B. Inland Fishes of California (University of California Press, 2002), pp. 307–311
- Froese, Rainer; Pauly, Daniel (eds.). "Menidia beryllina". FishBase. April 2006 version.
