= Central Valley (California) =

Flat valley that dominates central California

- Great Central Valley, Great Valley, Golden Empire
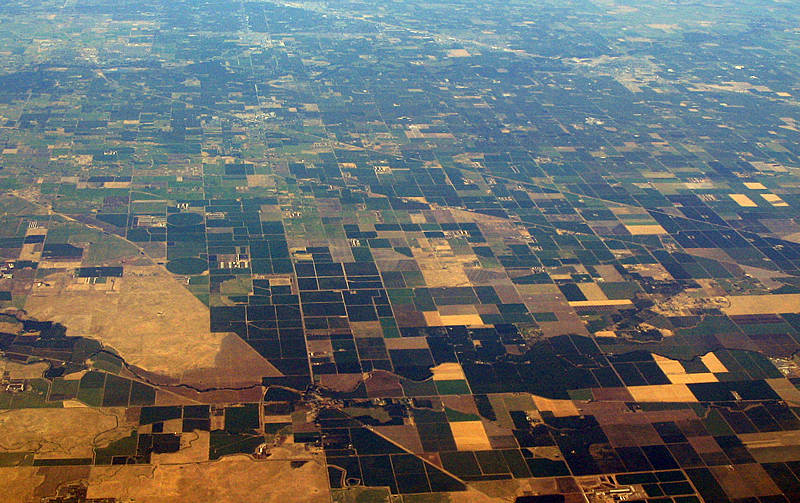
- Typical flat farmland of the Central Valley as seen from the air

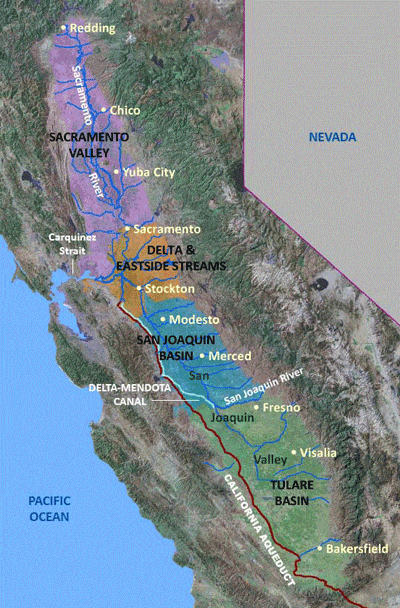
- United States Geological Survey map of their defined four major regions of the Central Valley
- Length: 450 mi (720 km)
- Width: 40 to 60 mi (64 to 97 km)
- Area: 18,000 mi^{2} (47,000 km^{2})
- Depth: 2,000 to 6,000 ft (610 to 1,830 m)

Geology
- Type: Alluvial
- Age: 2–3 million years

Geography
- Location: California, United States
- Population centers: Sacramento, Fresno, Bakersfield, Stockton and Modesto
- Borders on: Sierra Nevada (east), Cascade Range, Klamath Mountains (north), Coast Range, San Francisco Bay (west) and Tehachapi Mountains (south)
- Coordinates: 37°N 120.3°W
- Traversed by: Interstate 5 and Interstate 80
- Rivers: Sacramento River, San Joaquin River and Kings River

The Central Valley is a broad, elongated, flat valley that dominates the interior of California, United States. It is 40–60 mi (60–100 km) wide and runs approximately 450 mi (720 km) from north-northwest to south-southeast, inland from and parallel to the Pacific coast. It covers approximately 18,000 mi^{2} (47,000 km^{2}), about 11% of California's land area. The valley is bounded by the Coast Ranges to the west and the Sierra Nevada to the east.

The Central Valley is a region known for its agricultural productivity. It provides a large share of the food produced in California, which provides more than half of the fruits, vegetables, and nuts grown in the United States. More than 7,000,000 acres (28,000 km^{2}; 11,000 mi^{2}) of the valley are irrigated via reservoirs and canals. The valley hosts many cities, including the state capital Sacramento, as well as Redding, Chico, Yuba City, Woodland, Davis, Roseville, Elk Grove, Stockton, Modesto, Merced, Fresno, Visalia, Porterville, and Bakersfield.

The Central Valley watershed comprises 60,000 square miles (160,000 km^{2}), or over a third of California. It consists of three main drainage systems: the Sacramento Valley in the north, which receives over 20 inches (510 mm) of rain annually; the drier San Joaquin Valley in the south, and the Tulare Basin and its semi-arid desert climate at the southernmost end. The Sacramento and San Joaquin river systems drain their respective valleys and meet to form the Sacramento–San Joaquin River Delta, a large expanse of interconnected canals, stream beds, sloughs, marshes and peat islands. The delta empties into San Francisco Bay, and ultimately into the Pacific. The waters of the Tulare Basin essentially never reach the ocean (with the exception of Kings River waters diverted northward for irrigation), though they are connected by man-made canals to the San Joaquin.

The valley encompasses all or parts of 18 California counties: Butte, Colusa, Glenn, Fresno, Kern, Kings, Madera, Merced, Placer, San Joaquin, Sacramento, Shasta, Stanislaus, Sutter, Tehama, Tulare, Yolo and Yuba. The Central Valley has struggled to transform its economy beyond its role as an agricultural breadbasket. Although safety nets have drastically improved Central Valley poverty rates, the Central Valley still remains as one of the most impoverished regions of California.

Air pollution is a major issue, but it is mostly an issue in the San Joaquin Valley, rather than the Sacramento Valley.

== Name ==
Older names include "the Great Valley", a name still often seen in scientific references (notably Great Valley Sequence), as well as "Golden Empire", a booster name that is still referred to by some organizations (notably Golden Empire Transit, Golden Empire Council).

Ideas about what constitutes the "Central Valley" can vary from person-to-person. While almost all authoritative sources and external observers consider the Sacramento Valley to be part of the "Central Valley", many residents consider the Central Valley to consist of only the San Joaquin Valley. This is perhaps due to significant landscape and cultural differences between the two; the San Joaquin Valley is poorer and drier with more fertile soil, while the Sacramento Valley is wetter with poorer soils. The major presence of the Sacramento River and its tributaries in the Sacramento Valley, with its high year-round flow and wide waterways, has been compared to the small and seasonal rivers of the San Joaquin basin; this also contributes to different identities between the two regions.

== Population ==
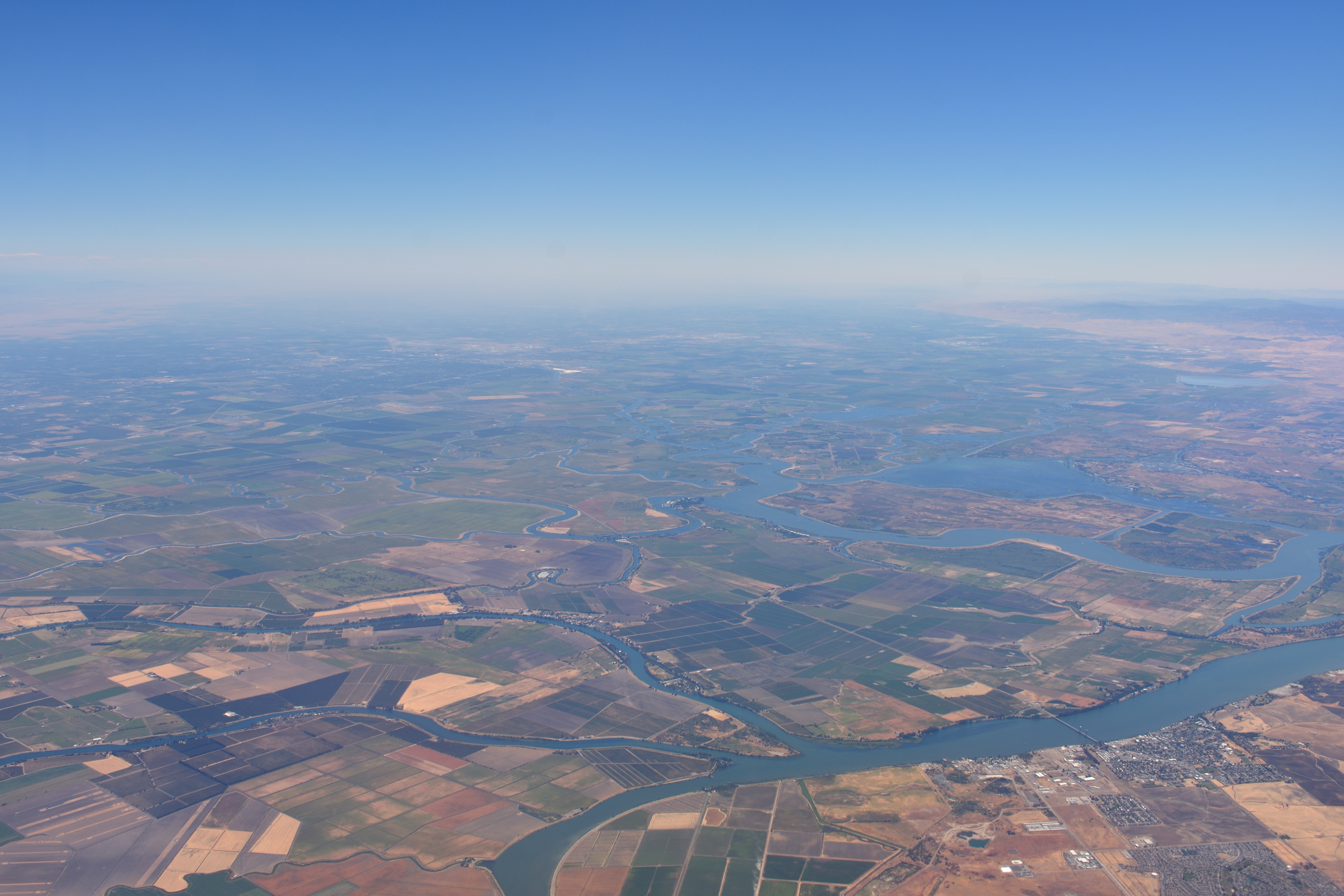
The Central Valley from the air, looking south from near Rio Vista

Subregions and their counties commonly associated with the valley include:

- North Sacramento Valley (all or parts of Shasta, Tehama, Glenn, Butte and Colusa counties)
- Sacramento Metropolitan area (all or parts of Sacramento, El Dorado, Sutter, Yuba, Yolo and Placer counties)
- North San Joaquin (all or parts of San Joaquin, Stanislaus and Merced counties)
- South San Joaquin (all or parts of Madera, Fresno, Kings, Tulare and Kern counties)

The four main population centers in the Central Valley area are roughly equidistant from each other. From south to north, they are Bakersfield, Fresno, Sacramento and Redding.

The table displays the counties of Central Valley and their respective population during the 2020 US Decennial Census. Total jobs for each county is from the U.S. Census Bureau, OnTheMap Application and LEHD Origin-Destination Employment Statistics (Beginning of Quarter Employment, 2nd Quarter of 2002–2020).

County	Population	Jobs
Butte County	211,632	73,219
Colusa County	21,839	7,834
Fresno County	1,008,654	374,478
Glenn County	28,917	9,314
Kern County	909,235	282,227
Kings County	152,486	43,542
Madera County	156,255	49,285
Merced County	281,202	74,470
Placer County	404,739	166,372
Sacramento County	1,585,055	669,429
San Joaquin County	779,233	247,406
Shasta County	182,155	61,665
Stanislaus County	552,878	184,916
Sutter County	99,633	29,951
Tehama County	65,829	17,735
Tulare County	473,117	157,971
Yolo County	216,403	106,643
Yuba County	81,575	16,937
Total	7,210,837	2,573,394

=== Metropolitan areas ===
As of 2020, some 7.2 million people lived in the Central Valley; it was the fastest-growing region in California. It includes 12 Metropolitan Statistical Areas (MSA) and 1 Micropolitan Statistical Area (μSA). Below, they are listed by MSA and μSA population. The largest city is Fresno followed by the state capital Sacramento. The following metropolitan and micropolitan statistical areas are listed from largest to smallest:

SMSA	Population
Sacramento Metropolitan Area	2,527,123
Fresno Metropolitan Area	930,450
Bakersfield Metropolitan Area	839,361
Stockton Metropolitan Area	696,214
Modesto Metropolitan Area	518,522
Visalia–Porterville Metropolitan Area	449,253
Merced Metropolitan Area	259,898
Chico Metropolitan Area	220,266
Redding Metropolitan Area	177,774
Yuba City Metropolitan Area	167,497
Hanford–Corcoran Metropolitan Area	153,765
Madera Metropolitan Area	152,925
Red Bluff Micropolitan Area	63,601

=== Ethnography ===
After English and Spanish, Punjabi is the third most commonly spoken language in the Central Valley. The valley has the largest Sikh population in the nation.

== Geology ==
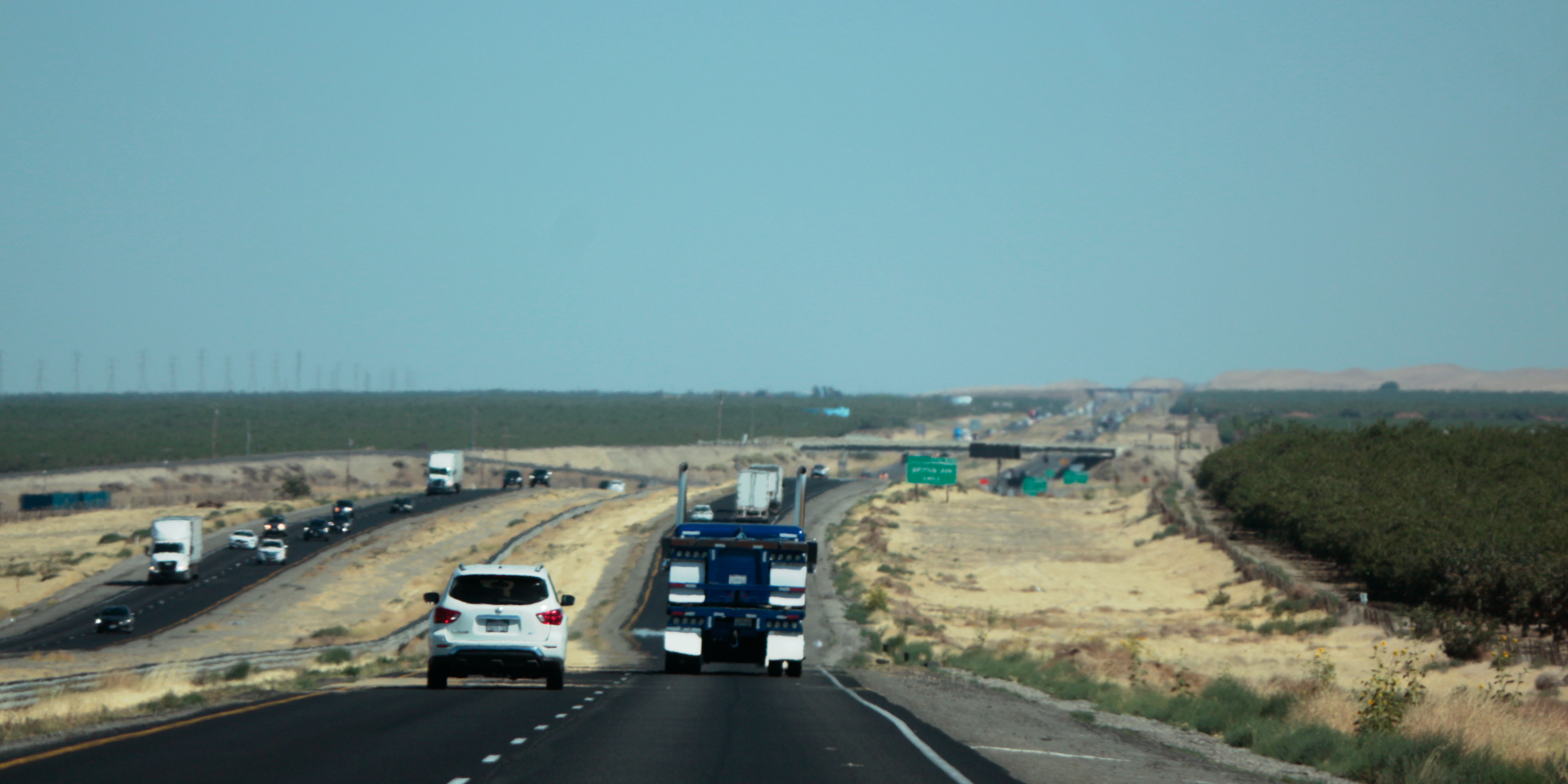
The valley as seen from Interstate 5, looking south near Derrick Avenue in Fresno County

The flatness of the valley floor contrasts with the rugged hills or gentle mountains that are typical of most of California's terrain. The valley is thought to have originated below sea level as an offshore area depressed by subduction of the Farallon Plate into a trench farther offshore. The valley has no earthquake faults of its own but is surrounded by faults to the east and west.

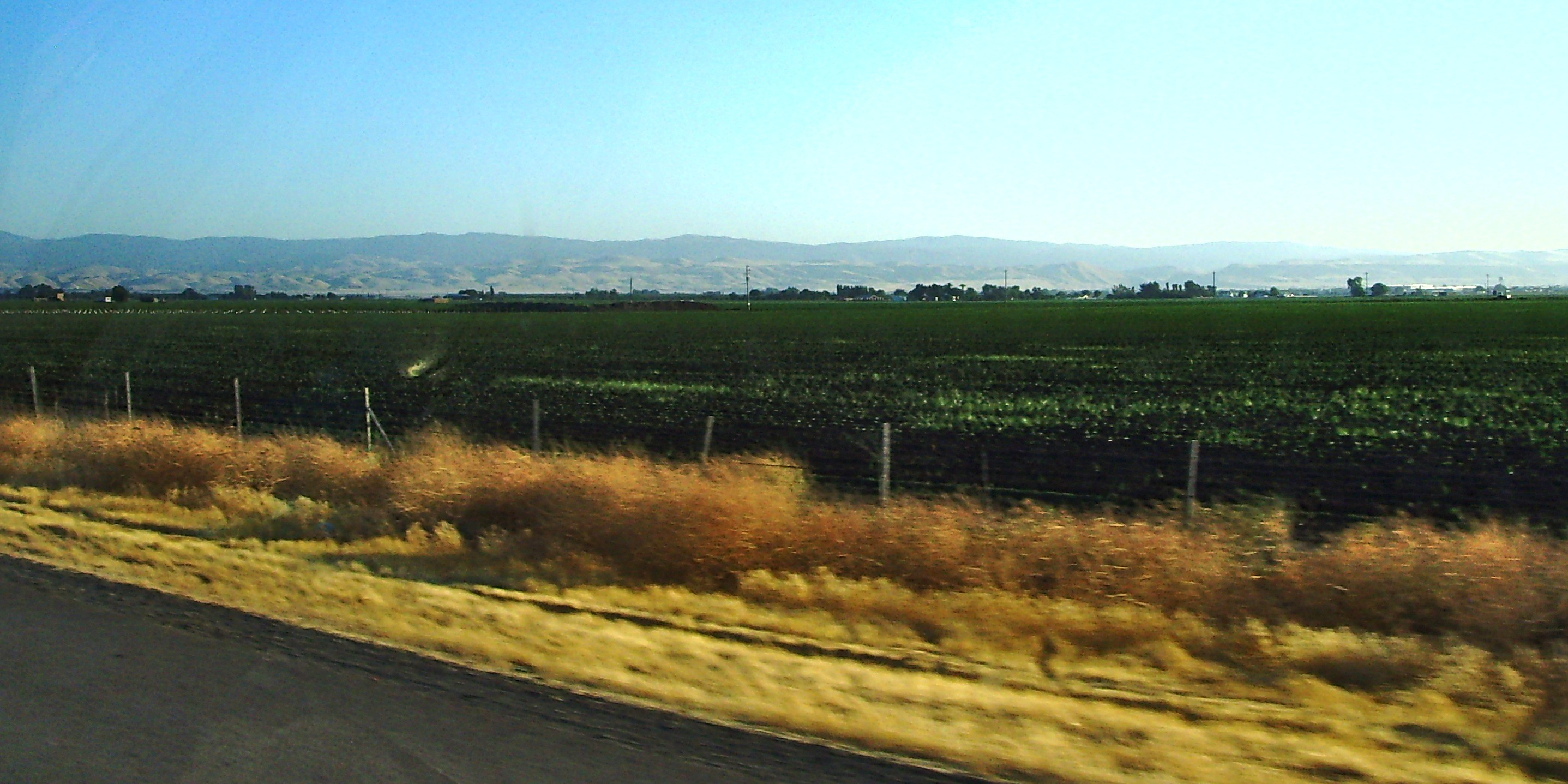
An example of the differences between the geology of the valley floor and that of the rugged hills of the Coast Ranges (Between Tracy and Patterson, CA:Interstate 5)

The valley was enclosed by the uplift of the Coast Ranges, with its original outlet into Monterey Bay. Faulting moved the Coast Ranges, and a new outlet developed near what is now San Francisco Bay. Over the millennia, the valley filled with the sediments of these same ranges, as well as the rising Sierra Nevada to the east; that filling eventually created an extraordinary flatness just barely above sea level. Before California's flood control and aqueduct system was built, annual snow melt turned much of the valley into an inland sea.

The one notable exception to the flat valley floor is Sutter Buttes, the remnants of an extinct volcano just to the northwest of Yuba City.

Another significant geologic feature of the Central Valley lies hidden beneath the delta. The Stockton Arch is an upwarping of the crust beneath the valley sediments that extends southwest to northeast across the valley.

The Central Valley lies within the California Trough physiographic section, which is part of the larger Pacific Border province, which in turn is part of the Pacific Mountain System.

Excessive groundwater pumping in Central Valley has caused measurable amounts of land subsidence in recent years.

== Environment ==
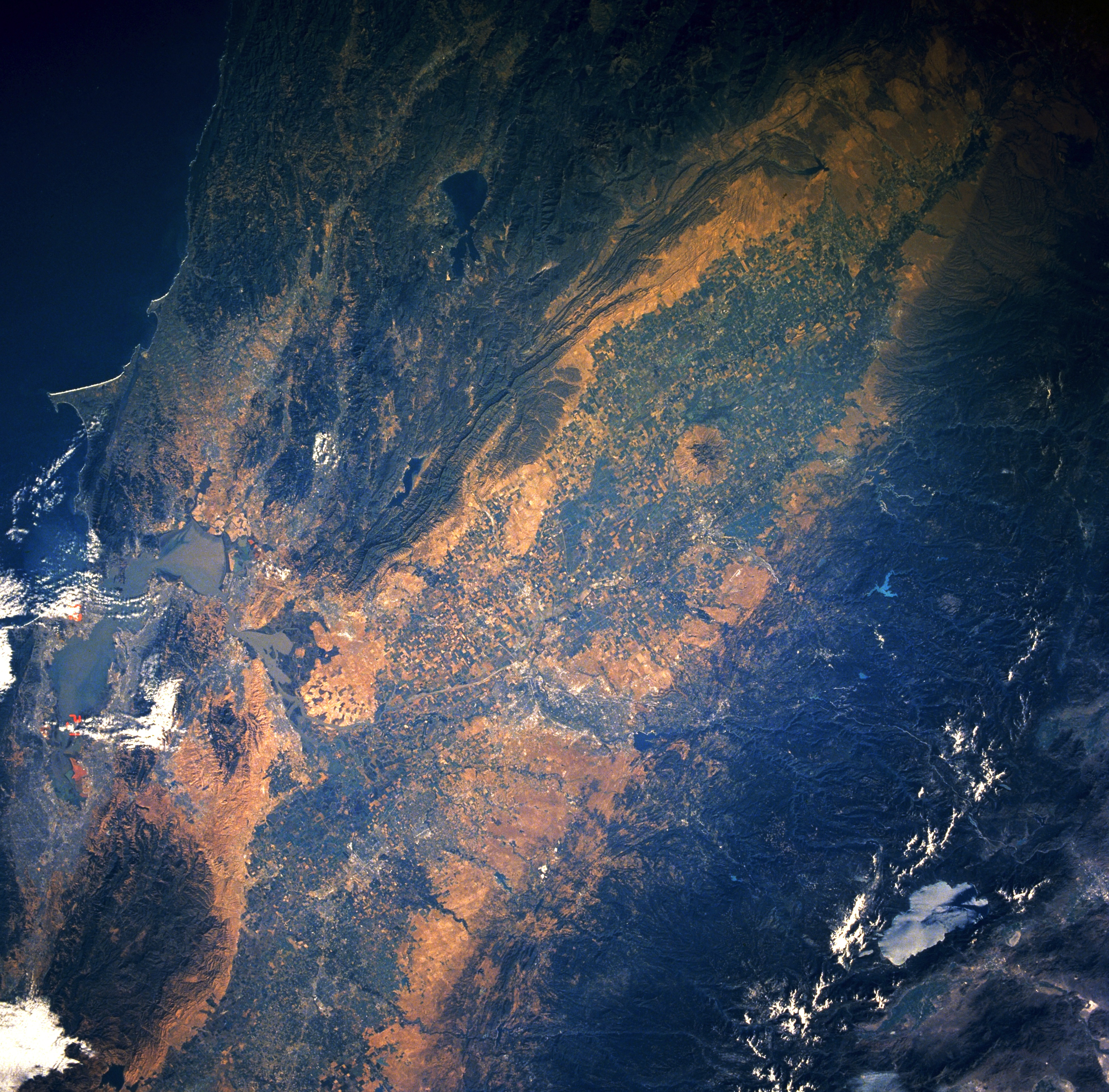
The Central Valley seen from space

=== Flora ===
The Central Valley was formerly a diverse expanse of grassland, containing areas of prairie, desert grassland (at the southern end), oak savanna, riparian forest, marsh, several types of seasonal vernal pools, and large lakes such as now-dry Tulare Lake (once the largest freshwater lake west of the Mississippi), Buena Vista Lake and Kern Lake. However, much of the Central Valley environment has been altered by human activity, including the introduction of exotic plants, notably grasses. The valley's grasslands, wetlands, and riparian forests constitute the California Central Valley grasslands, a temperate grasslands, savannas, and shrublands ecoregion. The foothill oak woodlands and chaparral that fringe the valley have been categorized as the California interior chaparral and woodlands ecoregion.

The dominant grass of the valley was Nassella pulchra mixed with other species, but today only 1% of the grassland in the valley is intact. Grassland flowers include California poppy (Eschscholzia californica), lupins, and purple owl's clover (Castilleja exserta), which can still be seen, especially in Antelope Valley in the Tehachapi Mountains. Riverside trees include willows, western sycamore (Platanus racemosa), box elder (Acer negundo), Fremont cottonwood (Populus fremontii), and the endemic valley oak (Quercus lobata). Another endemic species is brittlescale (Atriplex depressa) which grows in saline and alkali soils.

=== Fauna ===
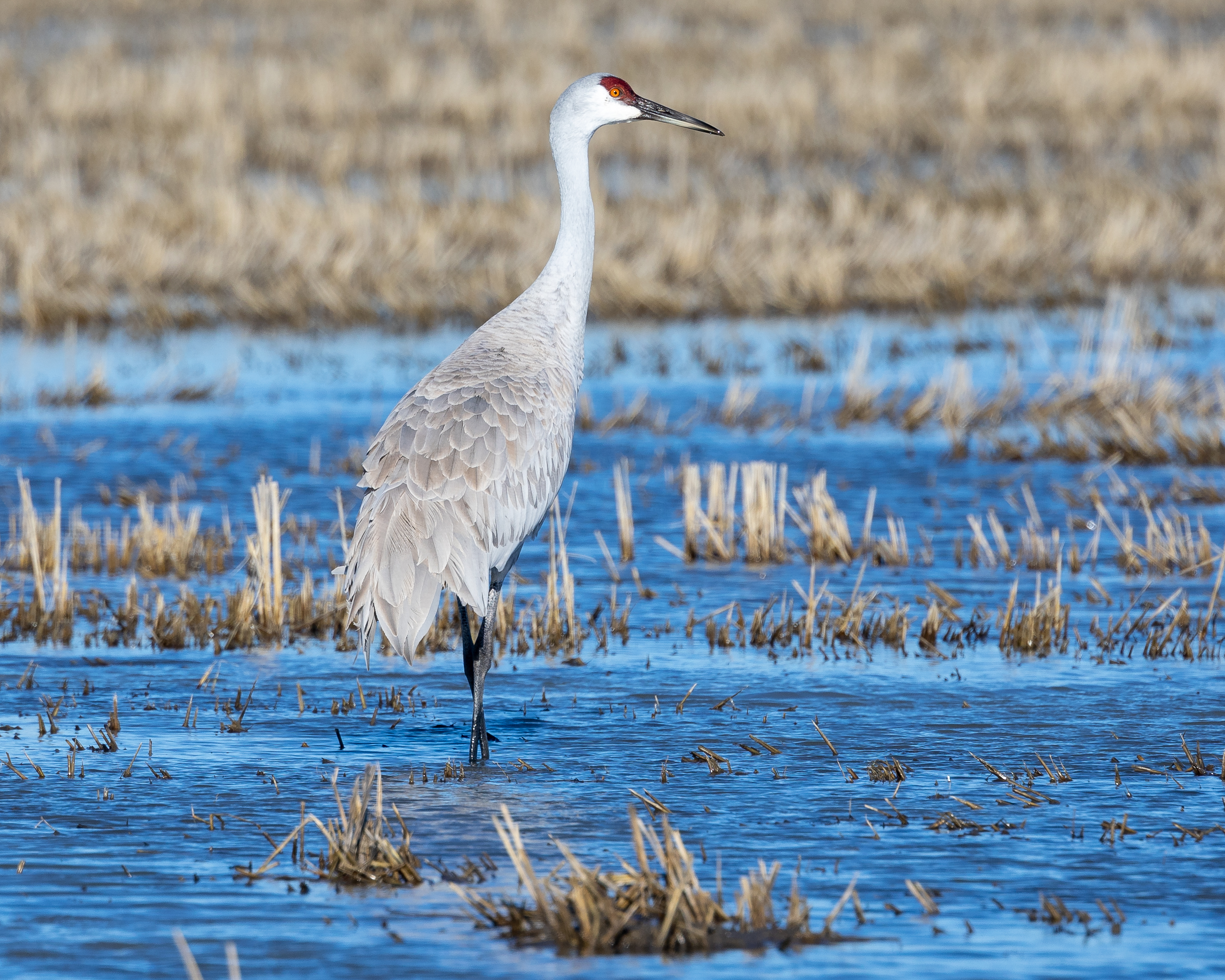
A sandhill crane (Antigone canadensis) in a flooded field in Butte County, California. On their wintering grounds in the Central Valley, sandhill cranes forage primarily on waste grain in corn, rice, and wheat fields.

The Central Valley was once home to large populations of pronghorn antelope (Antilocapra americana), elk including the endemic tule elk subspecies (Cervus elaphus nannodes), mule deer (Odocoileus hemionus), California ground squirrels, gophers, mice, hare, rabbits and kangaroo rats, along with their predators including the San Joaquin kit fox (an endangered subspecies surviving on the San Joaquin Valley's hillsides). The valley's wetlands were an important habitat for wintering waterbirds and migrating birds of other kinds. Reptiles and amphibians of the valley include the endemic San Joaquin coachwhip snake (Masticophis flagellum ruddocki), blunt-nosed leopard lizard (Gambelia sila), Gilbert's skink (Eumeces gilberti) and the western aquatic garter snake (Thamnophis couchii). Endemic invertebrates are present. The Central Valley is home to endemic fish species, including the Sacramento pikeminnow, Sacramento perch, Sacramento blackfish, and Sacramento splittail.

=== Protected areas ===
The Great Valley Grasslands State Park preserves an example of the valley's native grass habitat, while oak savanna habitats survive near Visalia. Areas of wetland and riverside woodland are found in the north, especially by the Sacramento River system, including the Nature Conservancy's Cosumnes River Preserve just south of Sacramento, Gray Lodge Wildlife Area, Butte Sink Wildlife Management Area, and other patches in the delta area. Remaining vernal pools include Pixley National Wildlife Refuge between Tulare, California, and Bakersfield and Jepson Prairie Preserve in the delta. Large blocks of desert scrubland exist in the southern San Joaquin Valley and the Carrizo Plain, just outside the valley, but offering a similar landscape.

The wetlands have been the target of rescue operations to restore areas replaced by agriculture.

These patches of natural habitat are disconnected, which is particularly damaging for wildlife that is used to migrating along the rivers. Agriculture, grazing land, and the draining of lakes and rivers have radically altered valley habitats. Most of the grassland has been overtaken by new species; most vernal pools have been destroyed, leaving only those on the higher slopes; the marshland has been drained, and the riverbank woodlands have nearly all been affected.

=== Health ===
The valley gives its name to Valley fever, which is primarily a disease of the lungs that is common in the southwestern United States and northwestern Mexico. It is caused by the fungus Coccidioides immitis, which grows in soils in areas of low rainfall, high summer temperatures, and moderate winter temperatures. These fungal spores become airborne when the soil is disturbed by winds, construction, or farming. This illness frequently takes weeks or months to resolve. Occasionally, Valley fever is fatal.

Due to the agricultural industry's significant presence in the Valley, pesticide drift and leaching have become concerns. Residents risk contamination when living in proximity to application sites.

=== Air pollution ===
Air pollution is a growing problem that affects all of the citizens in the Central Valley. Some reasons of poor air pollution in the Central Valley are due to agriculture and its geographical features, increasing the stagnation of automobile and other particulate pollution.

Since the Central Valley consists mostly of farming land in a wide, flat valley, the emissions from the soil that is used for growing produce are released into the air. The soil exudes nitrous oxide, an odorless and colorless gas that can be harmful when exposed to it for a long period of time, and incorporates itself into the ozone layer located at ground level. Production of nitrous oxide in California has shown that the addition of soil and fertilization can emit about 161,100 metric tons per year. Long term effects that nitrous oxide can have on a human being is loss of blood pressure, fainting, anemia, or lung cancer.

The physical geographical attributes can also contribute to the air pollution quality. The Central Valley is surrounded by mountain ranges which can capture the pollution coming from the agricultural farming, preventing it from dispersing from the other areas in California.

== Climate ==
Within a long period of groundwater depletion, short periods of recovery were mostly driven by extreme weather events that typically caused flooding and had negative social, environmental and economic consequences.

The northern Central Valley has a hot-summer Mediterranean climate (Köppen climate classification Csa); the more southerly parts in rainshadow zones are dry enough to be Mediterranean steppe or even low-latitude desert (BWh, as in areas around Bakersfield). It is very hot and dry during the summer and cool and damp in winter when frequent ground fog known regionally as "tule fog" can obscure vision. Summer daytime temperatures frequently surpass 100 °F (38 °C), and common heat waves might bring temperatures exceeding 115 °F (46 °C). Mid-autumn to mid-spring is the rainy season—although during the late summer, southeasterly winds can bring tropical thunderstorms, mainly in the southern half of the San Joaquin Valley but occasionally to the Sacramento Valley. The northern half of the Central Valley receives greater precipitation than the semidesert southern half. Frost occurs at times in the fall months, but snow is extremely rare.

=== Tule fog ===
Tule fog in Kern County

Tule fog /ˈtuːliː/ is a thick ground fog that settles along the valley's length. Tule fog forms during the late fall and winter (California's rainy season), after the first significant rainfall. The official season is from November 1 to March 31. This phenomenon is named after the valley's tule grass wetlands (tulares). Auto collisions caused by the tule fog are the leading cause of weather-related casualties in California.

=== Statistics for selected cities ===
Climate data for Sacramento, California (Sacramento Executive Airport), 1991–2020 normals, extremes 1941–present (Note: Official records for Sacramento were kept exclusively at the airport since 10 November 1941.)
Month	Jan	Feb	Mar	Apr	May	Jun	Jul	Aug	Sep	Oct	Nov	Dec	Year
Record high °F (°C)	76 (24)	78 (26)	88 (31)	95 (35)	105 (41)	115 (46)	114 (46)	112 (44)	114 (46)	104 (40)	87 (31)	74 (23)	115 (46)
Mean maximum °F (°C)	65.2 (18.4)	71.1 (21.7)	78.1 (25.6)	87.4 (30.8)	95.3 (35.2)	103.1 (39.5)	105.3 (40.7)	104.1 (40.1)	100.6 (38.1)	91.8 (33.2)	76.5 (24.7)	65.1 (18.4)	107.0 (41.7)
Mean daily maximum °F (°C)	56.0 (13.3)	61.3 (16.3)	66.3 (19.1)	72.1 (22.3)	80.3 (26.8)	87.9 (31.1)	92.6 (33.7)	91.9 (33.3)	88.5 (31.4)	78.8 (26.0)	65.0 (18.3)	56.0 (13.3)	74.7 (23.7)
Daily mean °F (°C)	47.6 (8.7)	51.4 (10.8)	55.4 (13.0)	59.5 (15.3)	66.1 (18.9)	72.2 (22.3)	75.9 (24.4)	75.3 (24.1)	72.5 (22.5)	64.5 (18.1)	53.9 (12.2)	47.3 (8.5)	61.8 (16.6)
Mean daily minimum °F (°C)	39.2 (4.0)	41.5 (5.3)	44.5 (6.9)	47.0 (8.3)	52.0 (11.1)	56.5 (13.6)	59.2 (15.1)	58.8 (14.9)	56.5 (13.6)	50.3 (10.2)	42.7 (5.9)	38.5 (3.6)	48.9 (9.4)
Mean minimum °F (°C)	29.1 (−1.6)	31.7 (−0.2)	35.1 (1.7)	37.9 (3.3)	44.1 (6.7)	49.5 (9.7)	54.1 (12.3)	53.8 (12.1)	49.6 (9.8)	41.7 (5.4)	32.7 (0.4)	28.7 (−1.8)	26.9 (−2.8)
Record low °F (°C)	20 (−7)	23 (−5)	26 (−3)	31 (−1)	34 (1)	41 (5)	48 (9)	48 (9)	42 (6)	35 (2)	26 (−3)	18 (−8)	18 (−8)
Average precipitation inches (mm)	3.66 (93)	3.49 (89)	2.68 (68)	1.26 (32)	0.75 (19)	0.23 (5.8)	0.00 (0.00)	0.04 (1.0)	0.09 (2.3)	0.85 (22)	1.66 (42)	3.43 (87)	18.14 (461)
Average precipitation days (≥ 0.01 in)	10.0	9.1	9.0	5.1	3.6	1.1	0.1	0.2	0.7	3.1	6.1	9.6	57.7
Average relative humidity (%)	83.3	76.8	71.6	64.5	58.9	55.0	53.2	55.7	57.0	63.1	75.6	82.9	66.5
Average dew point °F (°C)	39.4 (4.1)	42.1 (5.6)	42.8 (6.0)	43.7 (6.5)	46.9 (8.3)	50.4 (10.2)	53.1 (11.7)	53.4 (11.9)	50.9 (10.5)	47.5 (8.6)	43.7 (6.5)	39.2 (4.0)	46.1 (7.8)
Mean monthly sunshine hours	145.5	201.3	278.0	329.6	406.3	419.5	440.2	406.9	347.8	296.7	194.9	141.1	3,607.8
Percentage possible sunshine	48	67	75	83	92	94	98	96	93	86	64	48	81
Source: NOAA (relative humidity, dew point and sun 1961–1990)

Climate data for Sacramento 5 ESE, California (Sacramento State), 1991–2020 normals, extremes 1877–present
Month	Jan	Feb	Mar	Apr	May	Jun	Jul	Aug	Sep	Oct	Nov	Dec	Year
Record high °F (°C)	79 (26)	80 (27)	90 (32)	98 (37)	107 (42)	112 (44)	114 (46)	112 (44)	116 (47)	102 (39)	86 (30)	72 (22)	116 (47)
Mean maximum °F (°C)	66.4 (19.1)	72.5 (22.5)	80.6 (27.0)	89.5 (31.9)	97.1 (36.2)	104.4 (40.2)	106.7 (41.5)	105.5 (40.8)	102.0 (38.9)	92.3 (33.5)	77.3 (25.2)	65.9 (18.8)	108.1 (42.3)
Mean daily maximum °F (°C)	56.5 (13.6)	62.2 (16.8)	67.8 (19.9)	73.5 (23.1)	81.3 (27.4)	89.0 (31.7)	94.4 (34.7)	93.5 (34.2)	89.3 (31.8)	78.9 (26.1)	65.3 (18.5)	56.4 (13.6)	75.7 (24.3)
Daily mean °F (°C)	48.8 (9.3)	52.9 (11.6)	57.2 (14.0)	61.4 (16.3)	67.7 (19.8)	73.9 (23.3)	77.9 (25.5)	77.3 (25.2)	74.0 (23.3)	65.9 (18.8)	55.3 (12.9)	48.5 (9.2)	63.4 (17.4)
Mean daily minimum °F (°C)	41.1 (5.1)	43.7 (6.5)	46.7 (8.2)	49.3 (9.6)	54.0 (12.2)	58.7 (14.8)	61.4 (16.3)	61.0 (16.1)	58.8 (14.9)	52.9 (11.6)	45.3 (7.4)	40.7 (4.8)	51.1 (10.6)
Mean minimum °F (°C)	32.5 (0.3)	35.4 (1.9)	38.8 (3.8)	41.6 (5.3)	47.2 (8.4)	51.9 (11.1)	55.9 (13.3)	55.9 (13.3)	52.4 (11.3)	45.1 (7.3)	36.2 (2.3)	31.9 (−0.1)	30.5 (−0.8)
Record low °F (°C)	19 (−7)	21 (−6)	29 (−2)	34 (1)	37 (3)	43 (6)	47 (8)	48 (9)	44 (7)	34 (1)	27 (−3)	17 (−8)	17 (−8)
Average precipitation inches (mm)	3.87 (98)	3.63 (92)	2.82 (72)	1.44 (37)	0.86 (22)	0.21 (5.3)	0.00 (0.00)	0.02 (0.51)	0.15 (3.8)	0.93 (24)	1.78 (45)	3.49 (89)	19.20 (488)
Average precipitation days (≥ 0.01 in)	10.8	9.6	9.2	5.3	3.7	1.2	0.1	0.2	0.8	3.1	6.8	10.1	60.9
Source: NOAA, Western Regional Climate Center

Climate data for Fresno, California (Fresno Airport), 1991–2020 normals, (Note: Mean maxima and minima (i.e., the highest and lowest temperature readings during an entire month or year) calculated based on data at said location from 1991 to 2020.) extremes 1881–present (Note: Official records for Fresno kept September 1881 to 15 August 1887 at downtown, 16 August 1887 to June 1939 at Fresno City Offices, July 1939 to 20 August 1949 at Chandler Field, and at Fresno Yosemite Int'l since 21 August 1949. For more information, see Threadex)
Month	Jan	Feb	Mar	Apr	May	Jun	Jul	Aug	Sep	Oct	Nov	Dec	Year
Record high °F (°C)	78 (26)	84 (29)	93 (34)	101 (38)	110 (43)	112 (44)	115 (46)	113 (45)	114 (46)	105 (41)	90 (32)	77 (25)	115 (46)
Mean maximum °F (°C)	68.1 (20.1)	73.7 (23.2)	81.9 (27.7)	90.8 (32.7)	99.0 (37.2)	105.9 (41.1)	107.7 (42.1)	107.1 (41.7)	103.1 (39.5)	93.2 (34.0)	79.6 (26.4)	67.4 (19.7)	109.2 (42.9)
Mean daily maximum °F (°C)	55.4 (13.0)	61.3 (16.3)	67.5 (19.7)	73.7 (23.2)	82.7 (28.2)	91.4 (33.0)	97.7 (36.5)	96.5 (35.8)	90.7 (32.6)	78.7 (25.9)	64.9 (18.3)	55.3 (12.9)	76.3 (24.6)
Daily mean °F (°C)	48.0 (8.9)	52.3 (11.3)	57.4 (14.1)	62.3 (16.8)	70.2 (21.2)	77.6 (25.3)	83.5 (28.6)	82.2 (27.9)	77.1 (25.1)	66.7 (19.3)	55.1 (12.8)	47.5 (8.6)	65.0 (18.3)
Mean daily minimum °F (°C)	40.6 (4.8)	43.3 (6.3)	47.3 (8.5)	50.9 (10.5)	57.6 (14.2)	63.9 (17.7)	69.3 (20.7)	67.9 (19.9)	63.4 (17.4)	54.6 (12.6)	45.4 (7.4)	39.8 (4.3)	53.7 (12.1)
Mean minimum °F (°C)	30.5 (−0.8)	33.4 (0.8)	37.2 (2.9)	40.4 (4.7)	47.7 (8.7)	52.9 (11.6)	60.1 (15.6)	59.7 (15.4)	53.8 (12.1)	44.6 (7.0)	34.7 (1.5)	30.2 (−1.0)	28.8 (−1.8)
Record low °F (°C)	17 (−8)	24 (−4)	26 (−3)	32 (0)	36 (2)	42 (6)	50 (10)	49 (9)	37 (3)	27 (−3)	26 (−3)	18 (−8)	17 (−8)
Average precipitation inches (mm)	2.16 (55)	1.93 (49)	1.90 (48)	1.04 (26)	0.42 (11)	0.24 (6.1)	0.03 (0.76)	0.00 (0.00)	0.05 (1.3)	0.56 (14)	0.87 (22)	1.79 (45)	10.99 (279)
Average precipitation days (≥ 0.01 in)	7.7	8.5	7.2	4.5	2.7	0.7	0.3	0.1	0.6	2.2	4.7	7.3	46.5
Average relative humidity (%)	83.3	77.2	68.9	57.4	47.3	41.9	39.2	44.7	50.0	58.5	74.1	84.2	60.6
Average dew point °F (°C)	39.4 (4.1)	42.4 (5.8)	43.2 (6.2)	43.2 (6.2)	45.3 (7.4)	48.9 (9.4)	52.3 (11.3)	54.1 (12.3)	51.6 (10.9)	47.3 (8.5)	43.2 (6.2)	39.6 (4.2)	45.9 (7.7)
Mean monthly sunshine hours	141.5	196.9	286.2	335.5	398.9	412.2	428.2	399.6	345.9	302.3	189.9	127.1	3,564.2
Percentage possible sunshine	46	65	77	85	91	94	96	95	93	87	62	42	80
Source: NOAA (relative humidity, dew points and sun 1961–1990)

== Hydrography ==
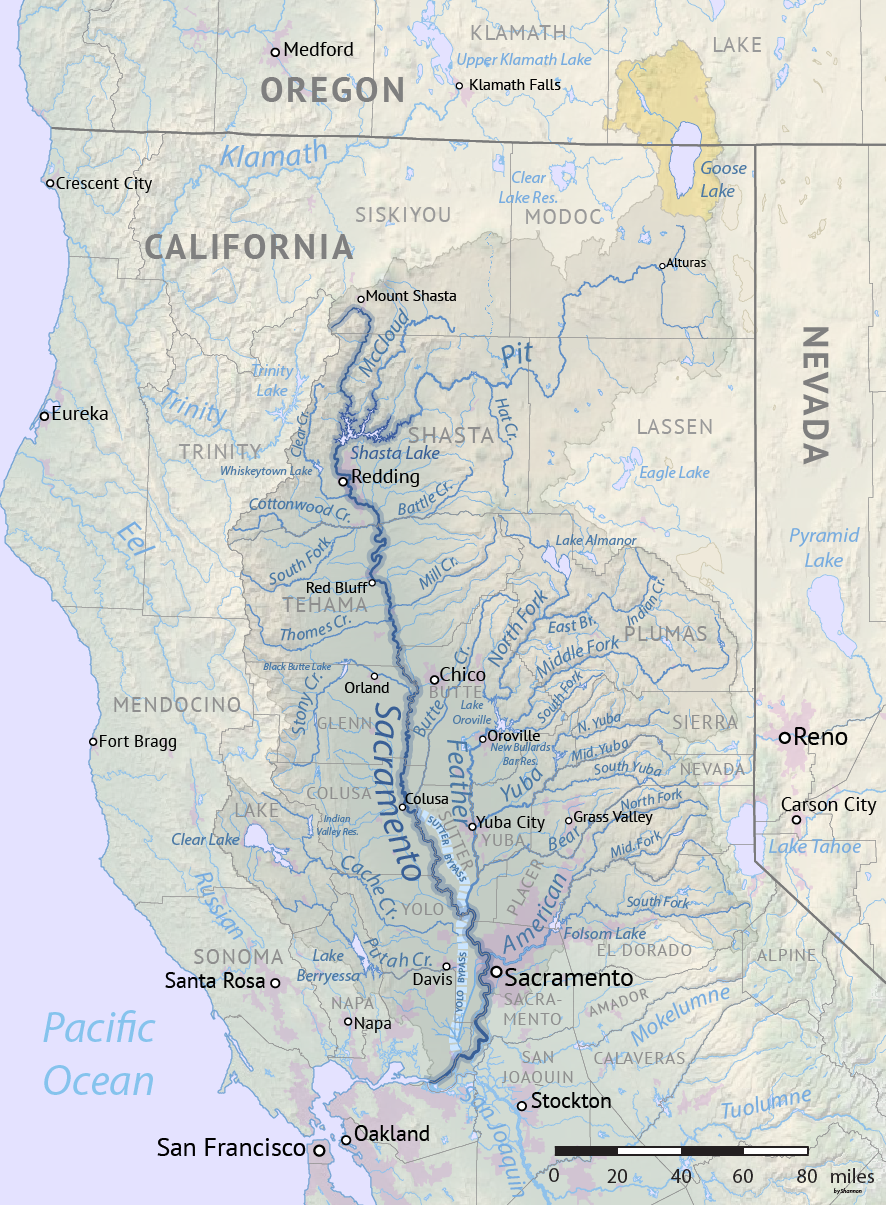
Sacramento River watershed

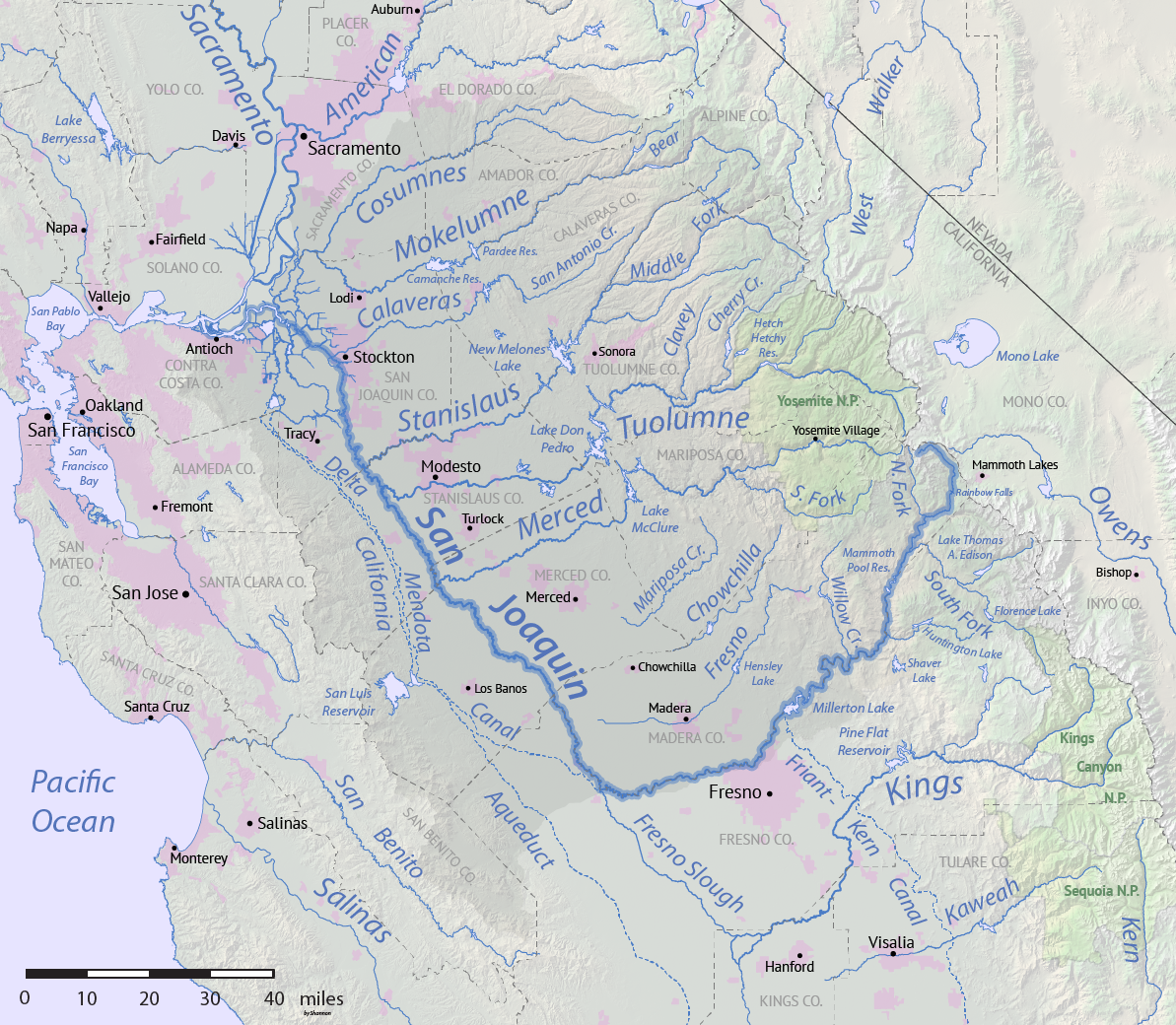
San Joaquin River watershed

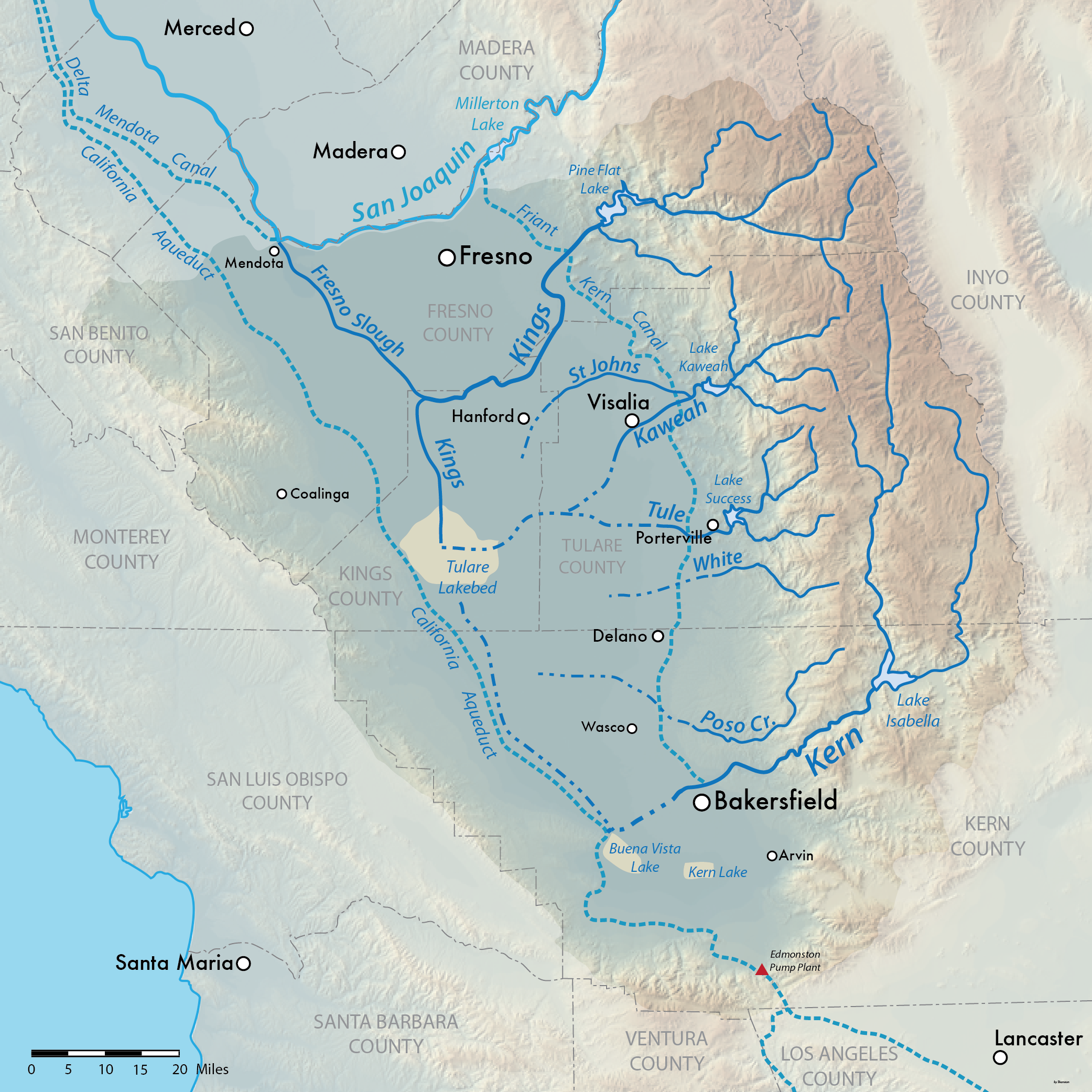
Tulare Basin watershed

Two river systems drain and define the two parts of the Central Valley. The Sacramento River, along with its tributaries the Feather River and American River, flows southwards through the Sacramento Valley for about 447 miles (719 km). In the San Joaquin Valley, the San Joaquin River flows roughly northwest for 365 miles (587 km), picking up tributaries such as the Merced River, Tuolumne River, Stanislaus River and Mokelumne River. The Central Valley watershed encompasses over a third of California at 60,000 square miles (160,000 km^{2}), with 46 percent draining into the Sacramento River, 26 percent into the San Joaquin, and 27 percent into Tulare Lake.

In the southern part of the San Joaquin Valley, the alluvial fan of the Kings River and another from Coast Ranges streams have created a divide. The dry Tulare basin of the Central Valley receives flow from four major Sierra Nevada rivers, the Kings, Kaweah, Tule, and Kern. This basin, usually endorheic, formerly filled during snowmelt and spilled out into the San Joaquin River. Called Tulare Lake, it is usually dry because the rivers feeding it have been diverted for agricultural purposes.

Central Valley rivers converge in the Sacramento-San Joaquin Delta, a network of marshy channels, distributaries, and sloughs that wind around islands mainly used for agriculture. There the rivers merge with tidewater, and eventually reach the ocean after passing through Suisun Bay, San Pablo Bay, upper San Francisco Bay, and finally the Golden Gate. Many of the islands lie below sea level because of intensive agriculture, and face a high risk of flooding, which would allow salt water to rush back into the delta, especially when too little fresh water is flowing in from the Valley.

The Sacramento River carries far more water than the San Joaquin, with an estimated 22 million acre-feet (27 km^{3}) of virgin annual runoff, as compared to the San Joaquin's approximately 6 million acre-feet (7.4 km^{3}). Intensive agricultural and municipal water consumption decreased the rate of outflow to about 17 million acre-feet (21 km^{3}) for the Sacramento and 3 million acre-feet (3.7 km^{3}) for the San Joaquin. These figures vary widely from year to year. Over 25 million people, living in the valley and other regions of the state, rely on the water carried by these rivers.

=== River engineering ===
Sierra Nevada runoff provides one of California's largest water resources. The Sacramento River is the second largest river to empty into the Pacific from the contiguous United States, behind only the Columbia River and greater than the Colorado River. Combined with the fertile and expansive area of the Central Valley's floor, the Central Valley is ideal for agriculture.

The Central Valley is one of the United States' most productive growing regions. This is made possible by engineering the watercourses to prevent flooding during the spring snowmelt and drying up in the summer and autumn. Many dams, including Shasta Dam, Oroville Dam, Folsom Dam, New Melones Dam, Don Pedro Dam, Hetch Hetchy Dam, Friant Dam, Pine Flat Dam and Isabella Dam, were constructed on the rivers, with many of them being part of the Central Valley Project. These dams impact physical, economic, cultural, and ecological resources: for example, enabling the development of its vast agricultural resources but leading to the loss of the Chinook salmon.

Post-World War II demand for urban development, most notably the San Francisco Bay Area and the Los Angeles/Inland Empire/San Diego, required water resources. Moreover, agriculture in the southern Central Valley required far more water than was available locally. The Feather River in the Sacramento Valley was looked to as a water source, leading to the California State Water Project. This transports water to the southern San Joaquin Valley and urban areas south of the Tehachapi Mountains.

Runoff from the Sacramento and San Joaquin Rivers is intercepted in the delta through a series of pumps that divert water into the California Aqueduct, which runs south along the length of the San Joaquin Valley. In parallel, pumps divert water into the Delta–Mendota Canal. The flow of the Sacramento River is further supplemented by a tunnel from the Trinity River (a tributary of the Klamath River, northwest of the Sacramento Valley) near Redding. Cities of the San Francisco Bay Area, also needing water, built aqueducts from the Mokelumne River and Tuolumne River that run east to west across the middle part of the Central Valley.

=== Flooding ===
Most valley lowlands are prone to flooding, especially in the old Tulare Lake, Buena Vista Lake, and Kern Lake rivers. The Kings, Kaweah, Tule and Kern rivers originally flowed into these seasonal lakes, which would expand each spring to flood large parts of the southern San Joaquin Valley. Farms, towns, and infrastructure in these lakebeds are protected with levee systems, while the risk of floods damaging properties increased greatly.

The Great Flood of 1862 was the valley's worst flood in recorded history, flooding most of the valley and putting some places as much as 20 feet (6.1 m) under water.

In 2003, it was determined that Sacramento had both the least protection against and nearly the highest risk of flooding. Congress then granted a $220 million loan for upgrades in Sacramento County. Other counties in the valley that often face flooding are Yuba, Stanislaus, and San Joaquin.

=== Landslides ===
A very strong positive correlation exists between rainfall and slow-moving landslides in Northern California, especially in the Central Valley region. Changes in climate and precipitation levels have shown that consistent average rainfall has increased the number and intensity of landslides within the past 5–6 years. This information was shown in a study that focused on the behavior of these slow-moving landslides and how their nature changed with years of extreme average rainfall versus minimal average rainfall. In 2016, the average annual precipitation levels were lower because of a drought that was coming to an end at that time. The minimal rainfall in that year showed that 119 landslides had been moving. Comparatively, in 2017, there were very extreme levels of precipitation in the Central Valley, which cause 312 landslides to move that year. Slow-moving landslides are impacted even if the intensity of the rainfall is not as severe.

Consistent, moderately intense rainfall increases the saturation of water in the ground. This over-saturation is what causes the movement of a slow-moving landslide, rather than the more quick-moving and rigorous landslides that also occur in this region of California. Quick-moving landslides are caused by very intense rain, or sometimes earthquakes, that make a greater difference in the land in a shorter amount of time. According to a survey paper written in 1988 about a storm that occurred in 1982 in the Central Valley region, rainstorms that can cause that type of landslide to happen about every 5 years. Landslides to higher degrees, such as the ones that happened due to the 1982 storm, only occur every 20 to 100+ years. This intense storm in the San Francisco Bay area caused a lot of damage as a result of moving debris and landslides. They caused damage to the land and put people living in these areas that are susceptible to these disasters in great harm. The aftermath of this storm involved millions of dollars in retributions to restore the land and surrounding areas. It also led people to make greater efforts into planning around the danger of these landslides, as in how to manipulate the land to accommodate the consequences.

=== Droughts ===
Out of the past twenty-two years, California has experienced significant drought conditions for thirteen years. From 2000 to 2018 was the second driest period that California has ever experienced. The driest three-year period ever in California was from 2012 to 2014. Three-quarters of the state of California is experiencing extreme drought conditions. There are also multiple types of droughts such as agricultural droughts, meteorological droughts, snow droughts, and hydrological droughts. All of these droughts affect California in different ways. Droughts can damage forests and can cause wildfires. Droughts cause forests to become dry which causes trees to die. Dead trees result in wildfires. The U.S. drought monitor is released every Thursday, showing which parts of the U.S. are in a drought. It started in 2000, and since then the longest duration of a drought in California lasted a total of 376 weeks. It started on December 11, 2011, and ended on March 5, 2019. The most intense period captured on the drought monitor was on the week of July 29, 2014. It showed that 58.41% of California's land was affected by a drought. In 2014–2015, farm-related losses in California totaled $5 billion and 20,000 farmers also lost their jobs.

== Economy ==
Agriculture is the primary industry in most of the Central Valley. A notable exception is the Sacramento area, which hosts a large and stable workforce of government employees. Despite state hiring cutbacks and the closure of several military bases, Sacramento's economy has continued to expand and diversify and now more closely resembles that of the San Francisco Bay Area. Primary sources of population growth are Bay Area migrants seeking lower housing costs, augmented by immigration from Asia, Central America, Mexico, Ukraine, and the rest of the former Soviet Union. The Central Valley's high rates of poverty, asthma, and air pollution have impeded the Valley from transforming its economy into relevance beyond its role as an agricultural breadbasket.

=== Agriculture ===
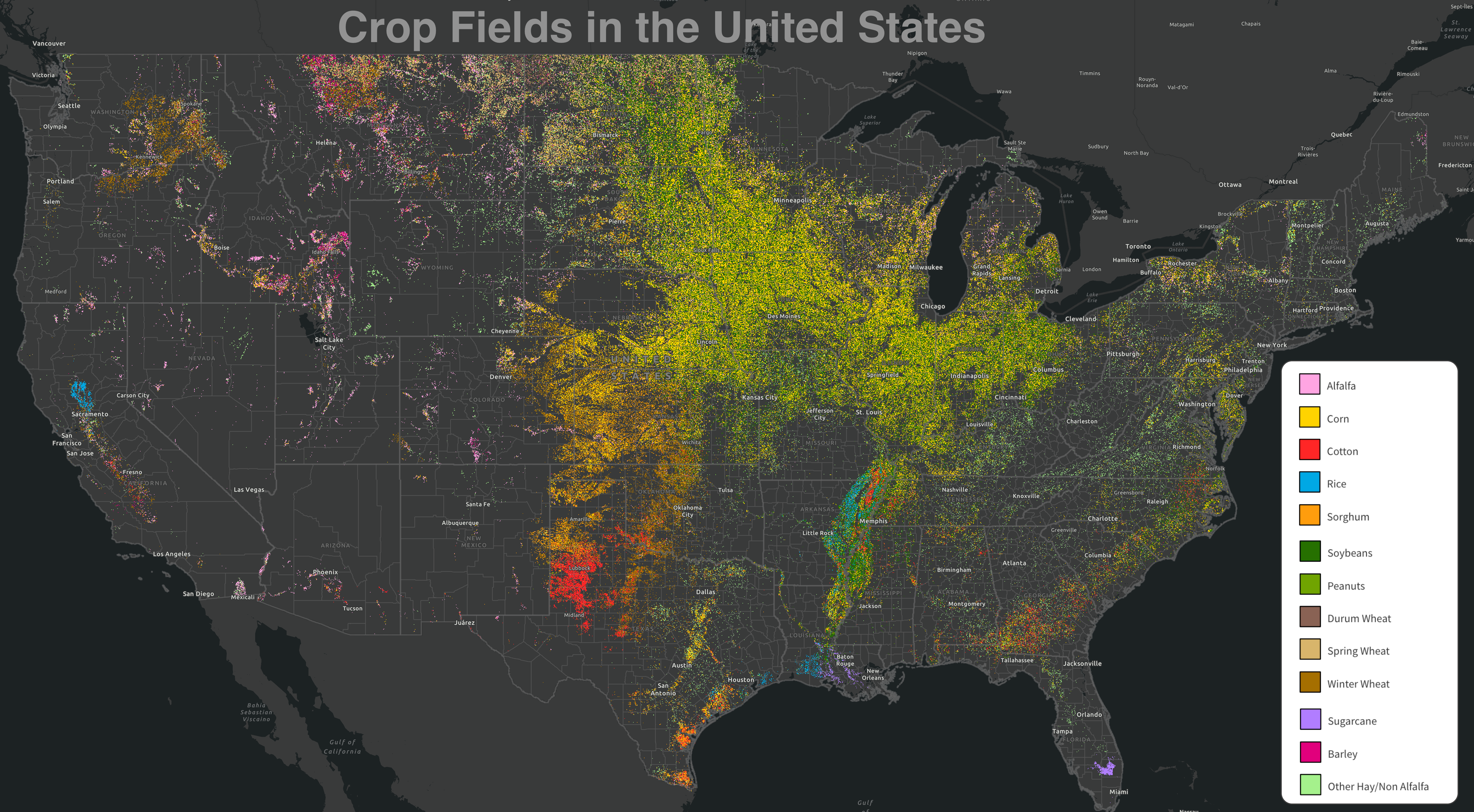
Crop fields in the United States

The Central Valley is one of the world's most productive agricultural regions. More than 230 crops are grown there. On less than 1 percent of the total farmland in the United States, the Central Valley produces 8 percent of the nation's agricultural output by value: US$43.5 billion in 2013. California's farms and ranches earned almost $50 billion in 2018. The valley's productivity relies on irrigation from surface water and badly depleted underground aquifers. About one-sixth of the US' irrigated land is in the Central Valley.

Virtually all non-tropical crops are grown in the Central Valley, which is the primary source for produce throughout the United States, including tomatoes, grapes, cotton, apricots, and asparagus. Six thousand almond growers produced more than 600 million pounds (270×10^{6} kg) in 2000, about 70 percent of the world's supply and nearly 100 percent of domestic production.

The US' top four counties in agricultural sales are in the Central Valley (2007 Data).

County	Sales
Fresno County	$3.731B
Tulare County	$3.335B
Kern County	$3.204B
Merced County	$2.330B

Early farming was concentrated close to the Sacramento-San Joaquin Delta, where the water table was high year-round and water transport was readily available. Subsequent irrigation projects brought many more parts of the valley into productive use. The even larger California State Water Project was formed in the 1950s and construction continued over the following decades.

=== National Farmworkers Association (NFWA) ===
In the 1960s, farm labor leaders Cesar Chavez and Dolores Huerta organized Mexican American grape pickers into a union, the National Farmworkers Association (NFWA), to improve their working conditions. This organizing took place primarily in the Central Valley because of the extensive agriculture, especially in and around Delano.

== Utilities ==
The state water project's Oroville Dam in the Sacramento Valley provides water and power for the California Aqueduct in the San Joaquin Valley. The aqueduct runs from Clifton Court Forebay in the Delta southwards across the Transverse Ranges. The Central Valley Project includes numerous facilities between Shasta Dam in the north and Bakersfield in the south. Pacific Gas and Electric, Western Area Power Administration, and Southern California Edison built an interconnected electric grid connecting the north and south ends of the Central Valley.

== See also ==
- List of regions of California
- Central Valley groundwater pollution
- Lake Corcoran
- Orland Buttes
