= Clear Lake splittail =

Conservation status
- Extinct (yes) (IUCN 3.1)

Scientific classification
- Kingdom: Animalia
- Phylum: Chordata
- Class: Actinopterygii
- Division: Teleostei
- Order: Cypriniformes
- Family: Leuciscidae
- Subfamily: Pogonichthyinae
- Genus: Pogonichthys
- Species: †P. ciscoides

Binomial name
- †Pogonichthys ciscoides Hopkirk, 1974

Species of fish

The Clear Lake splittail (Pogonichthys ciscoides) is an extinct species of freshwater ray-finned fish belonging to the family Leuciscidae, the shiners, daces and minnows. This species was endemic to California's Clear Lake and its tributaries until its numbers severely declined due to competition from the introduced bluegill and alterations to the flow of inlet streams. In greatly reduced numbers, the Clear Lake Splittail barely persisted until the 1967 introduction to surrounding lakes of the inland silverside as an experiment by the Department of Fish & Game. A fisherman supposedly introduced the silverside via bait bucket into Clear Lake. This dealt the final blow to the Clear Lake splittail, which had similar feeding habits. All of the splittails were taken by fishermen or have been eaten by catfish and large mouth bass. No Clear Lake splittails have been captured since the early 1970s, and the species is presumed to be extinct.
