= List of North American species extinct in the Holocene =

Map of North America

This is a list of North American animals extinct in the Holocene that covers extinctions from the Holocene epoch, a geologic epoch that began about 11,650 years before present (about 9700 BCE) (Note: The source gives "11,700 calendar yr b2k (before CE 2000)". But "BP" means "before CE 1950". Therefore, the Holocene began 11,650 BP. Doing the math, that is c. 9700 BCE.) and continues to the present day.

Recently extinct animals in the West Indies and Hawaii are in their own respective lists. The Florida Keys and Cozumel are included in this list due to their geographic and geological proximity to the continent.

Many extinction dates are unknown due to a lack of relevant information.

== Mammals (class Mammalia) ==
=== Armadillos, pampatheres, and glyptodonts (order Cingulata) ===
==== Chlamyphorid armadillos and glyptodonts (family Chlamyphoridae) ====
Common name	Scientific name	Range	Comments	Pictures
North American glyptodont	Glyptotherium cylindricum	Gulf of Mexico coast to northeastern Brazil	Most recent remains at Quetzaltenango, Guatemala dated to 9948-9306 BCE.	

=== Anteaters and sloths (order Pilosa) ===
==== Megalonychid ground sloths (family Megalonychidae) ====
Common name	Scientific name	Range	Comments	Pictures
Jefferson's ground sloth	Megalonyx jeffersonii	Alaska to northern Mexico	Most recent remains dated to 9540-9420 BCE.	
	Xibalbaonyx oviceps	Puerto Morelos, Mexico	Most recent remains at El Zapote cenote dated to 8697-8355 BCE.	

==== Mylodonts (family Mylodontidae) ====
Common name	Scientific name	Range	Comments	Pictures
Harlan's ground sloth	Paramylodon harlani	Mexico, Southern and Western United States	Most recent remains dated to 9880-8280 BCE.	

==== Nothrotheriid ground sloths (family Nothrotheriidae) ====
Common name	Scientific name	Range	Comments	Pictures
Shasta ground sloth	Nothrotheriops shastensis	California to Yucatan	Most recent remains dated to 8725-8175 BCE.	

=== Elephant-like mammals (order Proboscidea) ===
==== Gomphotheres (family Gomphotheriidae) ====
Common name	Scientific name	Range	Comments	Pictures
Cuvier's gomphothere	Cuvieronius hyodon	Central America, northern and central Andes	Most recent remains at Estanzuela, Guatemala dated to 9117-8793 BCE.	

==== Mastodons (family Mammutidae) ====
Common name	Scientific name	Range	Comments	Pictures
American mastodon	Mammut americanum	North America	Most recent remains dated to 7110-6810 BCE.	

==== Elephants and mammoths (family Elephantidae) ====
Common name	Scientific name	Range	Comments	Pictures
Columbian mammoth	Mammuthus columbi	Southern and Western United States, and northern Mexico	Most recent remains dated to 8080-7700 BCE.	
Pygmy mammoth	Mammuthus exilis	Santa Rosae island, California	Most recent remains dated to 9130-9030 BCE.	
Woolly mammoth	Mammuthus primigenius	Northern Eurasia and North America	Most recent remains at St. Paul, Alaska dated to 3635-3580 BCE.	

=== Sea cows (order Sirenia) ===
==== Dugongs (family Dugongidae) ====
Common name	Scientific name	Range	Comments	Pictures
Steller's sea cow	Hydrodamalis gigas	Bering Sea	Most recent remains at Kiska, Alaska dated to 1710-1785 CE.	

=== Lagomorphs (order Lagomorpha) ===
==== Pikas (family Ochotonidae) ====
Common name	Scientific name	Range	Comments
Giant pika	Ochotona whartoni	Northern North America and possibly northeastern Siberia	Most recent remains dated to 8301-7190 BCE.

=== Rodents (order Rodentia) ===
==== Beavers (family Castoridae) ====
Common name	Scientific name	Range	Comments	Pictures
Giant beaver	Castoroides ohioensis	North America	Most recent remains at Wayne County, New York dated to 10050-9550 BCE.	

==== Hamsters, voles, lemmings, muskrats, and New World rats and mice (family Cricetidae) ====
Common name	Scientific name	Range	Comments	Pictures
Gull Island vole	Microtus pennsylvanicus nesophilus	Great Gull Island, New York	Last collected in 1897. Disappeared when the Harbor Defenses of Long Island Sound were built.	
Anthony's woodrat	Neotoma bryanti anthonyi	Isla Todos Santos, Mexico	Last recorded in 1926. Extinct due to predation by introduced feral cats.	
Bunker's woodrat	Neotoma bryanti bunkeri	Coronados Islands, Mexico	Last recorded in 1931. Likely extinct due to depletion of food sources and predation by introduced cats.	
San Martín Island woodrat	Neotoma bryanti martinensis	Isla San Martín, Mexico	Last recorded in the 1950s. Extinct due to predation by introduced cats.	
Nelson's rice rat	Oryzomys nelsoni	María Madre Island, Mexico	Last recorded in 1897. Possibly extinct due to introduced black rats.	
Giant island deer mouse	Peromyscus nesodytes	Channel Islands of California	Most recent remains at Cave of the Chimneys, San Miguel Island, dated to around 950 CE. If the species survived into colonial times it might have become extinct due to overgrazing, increased wind and water erosion destroying its natural habitat.	
Pemberton's deer mouse	Peromyscus pembertoni	San Pedro Nolasco Island, Mexico	Last collected in 1931.	
Pallid beach mouse	Peromyscus polionotus decoloratus	Coastal Florida	Last recorded in 1946. Extinct due to extensive habitat loss.	

===== Possibly extinct =====
Common name	Scientific name	Range	Comments
Angel Island mouse	Peromyscus guardia	Isla Ángel de la Guarda, Mexico and nearby islets	Last collected on Ángel de la Guarda in 1993. Declined due to competition with introduced rodents, and predation by cats.
Puebla deer mouse	Peromyscus mekisturus	Southeast Puebla, Mexico	Last recorded in 1957. Possibly extinct due to habitat degradation caused by agriculture or climate change.

==== Gophers (family Geomyidae) ====
Common name	Scientific name	Range	Comments
Goff's pocket gopher	Geomys pinetis goffi	Pineda Ridge, Florida	Last recorded in 1955.
Tacoma pocket gopher	Thomomys mazama tacomensis	Tacoma-Steilacoom, Washington area	Last collected in 1962. Extinct due to habitat alteration through residential development and gravel mining.

=== Carnivorans (order Carnivora) ===
==== Cats (family Felidae) ====
Common name	Scientific name	Range	Comments	Pictures
North American sabertooth cat	Smilodon fatalis	Southern Alberta to northwestern South America	Most recent remains dated to 7615-7305 BCE.	

===== Locally extinct =====
Common name	Scientific name	Range	Comments	Pictures
Eastern cougar	Population of the North American cougar (Puma concolor couguar)	Eastern North America	Last confirmed individual trapped in Somerset County, Maine in 1938. Though named as a distinct subspecies in 1946, genetic research indicates that no population of North American cougars is different enough to warrant subspecies status.	

==== Dogs (family Canidae) ====
Common name	Scientific name	Range	Comments	Pictures
Dire wolf	Aenocyon dirus	North America and western South America	Most recent remains at Rancho La Brea, California dated to 10208-8718 BCE. Also dated in Cutler Hammock, Florida to the Greenlandian stage of the Holocene.	
Kenai Peninsula wolf	Canis lupus alces	Kenai Peninsula, Alaska	Exterminated through hunting, trapping, and poisoning by 1915. Wolves recolonized the Peninsula in 1962, a decade after predator eradication efforts were reduced.	
Newfoundland wolf	Canis lupus beothucus	Newfoundland	Last known individual killed in 1896.	
Banks Island wolf	Canis lupus bernardi	Banks Island, Northwest Territories	Last recorded between 1918 and 1952. Considered a synonym of the arctic wolf (C. l. arctos) by some authors on morphological grounds.	
Cascade Mountains wolf	Canis lupus fuscus	Pacific Northwest	Last recorded in 1940. Considered a synonym of the Great Plains wolf (C. l. nubilus) by some authors.	
Mogollon mountain wolf	Canis lupus mogollonensis	Arizona	Last recorded in 1935. Considered a synonym of the Great Plains wolf (C. l. nubilus) or the Mexican wolf (C. l. baileyi) by different authors.	
Texas gray wolf	Canis lupus monstrabilis	Texas	Last recorded in 1942. Considered a synonym of the Mexican wolf (C. l. baileyi) by some authors.	
Southern Rocky Mountain wolf	Canis lupus youngi	Southern Rocky Mountains	Last recorded in 1935.	
Florida black wolf	Canis rufus floridanus	Southeastern United States	Extinct by 1920 as a result of deliberate eradication efforts, habitat destruction, and loss of prey.	
Gregory's wolf	Canis rufus gregoryi	Lower Mississippi Valley	The last individuals may have hybridized with coyotes, whose post-1930 expansion eastward was facilitated by deforestation.	
Southern California kit fox	Vulpes macrotis macrotis	Southern California coast	Last collected in 1903.	

===== Extinct in the wild =====
Common name	Scientific name	Range	Comments	Pictures
Mexican wolf	Canis lupus baileyi	Southwestern United States and northern Mexico	Extirpated from the wild in the early 1970s and reintroduced in 1998.	
Texas red wolf	Canis rufus rufus	Central Texas to southern Louisiana	Extinct in the wild by 1980 and introduced (in lieu of the extinct subspecies) to eastern North Carolina in 1987. The species is threatened by human persecution and hybridization with coyotes. Declined as a result of deliberate eradication efforts, habitat destruction, and hybridization with the coyote.	

==== Bears (family Ursidae) ====
Common name	Scientific name	Range	Comments	Pictures
Giant short-faced bear	Arctodus simus	North America	Most recent remains dated to 8995-8845 BCE.	

===== Locally extinct =====
Common name	Scientific name	Range	Comments	Pictures
California grizzly bear	Population of the grizzly bear (Ursus arctos horribilis)	California	Last recorded at Sequoia National Park in 1924. Though once named as the subspecies U. a. californicus, DNA evidence shows that it is not different enough to warrant separate status.	
Mexican grizzly bear	Population of the grizzly bear (Ursus arctos horribilis)	Aridoamerica	Last known individual killed in northern Sonora in 1976. Though once named as the subspecies U. a. nelsoni, DNA evidence shows that it is not different enough to warrant separate status.	
Ungava brown bear	Population of the grizzly bear (Ursus arctos horribilis)	Ungava Peninsula, Quebec	Known from subfossil remains, indigenous folklore and sporadic hunting records of the 18th and 19th centuries. Possible last sighting in 1942, but it could also have been a brown morph of the American black bear.	

==== Earless seals (family Phocidae) ====
Common name	Scientific name	Range	Comments	Pictures
Caribbean monk seal	Neomonachus tropicalis	Caribbean Sea, Bahamas, and the Gulf of Mexico	Last recorded in southern Florida in 1922 and Yucatan in 1950. It was intensely hunted for its skin and oil, and persecuted as a competitor by fishermen in later times.	

==== Martens, polecats, otters, badgers, and weasels (family Mustelidae) ====
Common name	Scientific name	Range	Comments	Pictures
Sea mink	Neogale macrodon	Atlantic coast of Canada and New England	Hunted to extinction by fur traders by about 1860. Later records up to 1894 are actually references to the American mink.	

===== Extinct in the wild (formerly) =====
Common name	Scientific name	Range	Comments	Pictures
Black-footed ferret	Mustela nigripes	Great Plains	Declared extinct in 1979, a small population was rediscovered in 1981, but was considered extinct in the wild by 1987. Declined due to persecution as agricultural pest of its main prey, the prairie dog; introduced diseases like canine distemper and plague, and conversion of grasslands to agriculture. In 1996, a population was reintroduced to the Buffalo Gap National Grassland and Badlands National Park in South Dakota, where Forest Service rangers and non-profit organizations help to protect the population from ongoing threats. It remains the only wild breeding population for the species, which is still critically endangered according to the IUCN red list.	

=== Odd-toed ungulates (order Perissodactyla) ===
==== Horses, asses, and zebras (family Equidae) ====
Common name	Scientific name	Range	Comments	Pictures
Mexican horse	Equus conversidens	Western North America	A small non-caballine species that coexisted in North America with the caballine horse. The most recent remains were dated to 8965-8875 BCE.	
Fraternal horse	Equus fraternus	Eastern North America	Most recent remains at Cutler Hammock, Florida dated to the Greenlandian stage of the Holocene.	
Yukon horse	Equus lambei	Northwestern North America	Environmental DNA last detected in permafrost of central Yukon dated to 3979-2640 BCE. Identified at times as a wild ass (both Equus hemionus and Equus africanus) on morphological grounds, but ancient mtDNA studies confirm caballine affiliation and possible synonymity with Equus ferus. Domestic horses were introduced to the Americas by the Spanish in 1493 and a feral population was established in Querétaro, Mexico by 1553.	

=== Even-toed ungulates (order Artiodactyla) ===
==== Camels and llamas (family Camelidae) ====
Common name	Scientific name	Range	Comments	Pictures
Western camel	Camelops hesternus	Western North America	Most recent remains dated to 8170-7840 BCE.	
Large-headed llama	Hemiauchenia macrocephala	North and Central America	Most recent remains at Cutler Hammock, Florida dated to the Greenlandian stage of the Holocene, with signs of human hunting.	

==== Peccaries (family Tayassuidae) ====
Common name	Scientific name	Range	Comments	Pictures
Long-nosed peccary	Mylohyus fossilis	Southern and eastern United States	Most recent remains at Cutler Hammock, Florida dated to the Greenlandian stage of the Holocene.	
Flat-headed peccary	Platygonus compressus	Northwestern Mexico to northern Yukon	Most recent remains dated to 8990-8690 BCE.	

==== Gray whales (family Eschrichtiidae) ====
===== Locally extinct =====
Common name	Scientific name	Range	Comments	Pictures
Atlantic gray whale	Population of the gray whale (Eschrichtius robustus)	North Atlantic Ocean and Mediterranean Sea	Last recorded in 1760. The same species survives on the Pacific Ocean. A single individual, presumably dispersed over the Arctic, was observed off Florida in 2023 and Nantucket, Massachusetts in 2024.	

==== True deer (family Cervidae) ====
Common name	Scientific name	Range	Comments	Pictures
Stag-moose	Cervalces scotti	Great Lakes Region	Most recent remains dated to 9230-8930 BCE.	
Pedro González dwarf deer	Mazama sp.	Pedro González, Panama	Most recent remains dated to 2342 BCE. Archaeological remains indicate that this species was commonly hunted after humans first moved into the island, and also that their diet changed to include more abrasive material as a result of humans clearing the island's forests, before it went extinct.	
Toronto subway deer	Torontoceros hypogaeus	Toronto, Ontario	Known from a single individual dated to 9350 BCE.	

===== Locally extinct =====
Common name	Scientific name	Range	Comments	Pictures
Eastern elk	Population of the North American wapiti (Cervus canadensis canadensis)	Eastern North America	Traditionally considered the nominate subspecies, but genetic research indicates that there are not enough differences to consider separate subspecies of C. canadensis in North America, and the taxon C. c. canadensis is not extinct as a result. The last confirmed individual was killed near the Clarion River of central Pennsylvania in 1867, though there were unconfirmed sightings in 1869-1870, and ten claimed killings in northern Pennsylvania in 1878. Western elk were reintroduced for hunting purposes in the same state in 1912.	
Merriam's elk	Population of the North American wapiti (Cervus canadensis canadensis)	New Mexico, Arizona, and West Texas	Named as the species Cervus merriami in 1902 on the basis of a single skull; in 1978, an anatomical review of a dozen individuals found just enough of a case to consider it a subspecies of Cervus elaphus (later C. canadensis). Further anatomical and genetic research suggest that all American wapiti likely belong to the same subspecies and that the taxon C. c. merriami is a synonym of C. c. canadensis. Wapiti from other regions have been reintroduced to the purported distribution area of Merriam's elk.	
Queen Charlotte Islands caribou	Population of the caribou (Rangifer tarandus)	Graham Island, British Columbia	Described as the subspecies R. t. dawsoni in 1900 due to its isolated location and anatomical differences, but mtDNA studies in 2002 showed not enough differences to warrant separate status. The last known herd was found in 1908, comprising two adult males, one female, and one calf; all but the calf were killed.	

==== Cattle, goats, antelopes, and others (family Bovidae) ====
Common name	Scientific name	Range	Comments	Pictures
Ancient bison	Bison antiquus	North America	A transitional form between steppe bison and modern American bison whose more recent remains date to the early Holocene of Valsequillo basin in Puebla, Mexico. However the direct dating to 5271-5131 BCE is not calibrated and the remains could be older. Other remains in North America have been dated to 8640-8500 BCE.	
Western bison	Bison occidentalis	Eastern Beringia	Another transitional form to American bison that originated in a second dispersal of steppe bison across Beringia, and persisted in Alaska until around 220 CE.	
Steppe bison	Bison priscus	Northern Eurasia and North America	Most recent remains at Whitehorse, Yukon dated to 3628-3377 BCE.	
Woodland muskox	Bootherium bombifrons	North America	Most recent remains dated to 9110-8950 BCE.	
Shrub-ox	Euceratherium collinum	Western United States and Mexico	Most recent remains dated to 9830-9530 BCE.	
Harrington's mountain goat	Oreamnos harringtoni	Southern Rocky Mountains	Most recent remains at Rampart Cave, Arizona dated to 10490-9136 BCE.	

===== Locally extinct =====
Common name	Scientific name	Range	Comments	Pictures
Wild yak	Bos mutus	Tibet to eastern Siberia and Beringia	Environmental DNA last detected in permafrost of central Yukon dated to 8231-7959 BCE.	

== Birds (class Aves) ==
=== Landfowl (order Galliformes) ===
==== Pheasants and allies (family Phasianidae) ====
Common name	Scientific name	Range	Comments	Pictures
Californian turkey	Meleagris californica	California	Most recent remains dated to 9100-8380 BCE. However this date was not calibrated and the remains could be older.	
Southwestern turkey	Meleagris crassipes	New Mexico	Most recent remains dated to 11510-8770 BCE (uncalibrated date).	
Heath hen	Tympanuchus cupido cupido	East coast of the United States	Last individual, a male, died in Martha's Vineyard in 1932.	
New Mexico sharp-tailed grouse	Tympanuchus phasianellus hueyi	New Mexico and possibly Colorado	Last individual killed in Colfax County, New Mexico in 1952.	

=== Waterfowl (order Anseriformes) ===
==== Ducks, geese, and swans (family Anatidae) ====
Common name	Scientific name	Range	Comments	Pictures
Newfoundland duck	Anas fuscescens	Newfoundland	Only known from historical descriptions, the most recent from 1824.	
Schneider's teal	Anas schneideri	Little Box Elder Cave, Wyoming	Most recent remains dated to 8800-8300 BCE (uncalibrated date).	
Labrador duck	Camptorhynchus labradorius	Atlantic coast of Canada and New England	Last confirmed individual killed in 1875; unconfirmed in 1878.	
Law's diving-goose	Chendytes lawi	Coastal California and Oregon	Most recent remains at Ventura County, California dated to 770-400 BCE.	

=== Grebes (order Podicipediformes) ===
==== Grebes (family Podicipedidae) ====
Common name	Scientific name	Range	Comments	Pictures
Atitlán grebe	Podilymbus gigas	Lake Atitlán, Guatemala	Extinct in 1983-1986 due to competition and predation by introduced largemouth bass, reed-cutting for tourism development, falling water levels after the 1976 Guatemala earthquake, drowning in gill nets and disturbance by boat traffic.	

=== Swifts, treeswifts, and hummingbirds (order Apodiformes) ===
==== Hummingbirds (family Trochillidae) ====
===== Possibly extinct =====
Common name	Scientific name	Range	Comments
Guanacaste hummingbird	Amazilia alfaroana	Miravalles Volcano, Costa Rica	Only known from the holotype collected in 1895. The cause of extinction is unknown, but could be related to habitat loss caused by agriculture.

=== Pigeons and doves (order Columbiformes) ===
==== Pigeons and doves (family Columbidae) ====
Common name	Scientific name	Range	Comments	Pictures
Passenger pigeon	Ectopistes migratorius	Eastern North America	One of the most numerous birds at the beginning of the 19th century, it declined dramatically as a result of hunting, Newcastle disease, and the clearance of hardwood trees in which it fed, until the last individual in the wild was shot in 1900. The last captive individual, Martha, died at Cincinnati Zoo in 1914.	

===== Extinct in the wild =====
Common name	Scientific name	Range	Comments	Pictures
Socorro dove	Zenaida graysoni	Socorro Island, Mexico	Last recorded in the wild in 1972. It declined as a result of predation by introduced cats, hunting, and habitat degradation caused by feral goats and Central American locusts. Individuals survive in captivity in the United States, though several are hybridized with the mourning dove (Z. macroura).	

=== Rails and cranes (order Gruiformes) ===
==== Rails (family Rallidae) ====
===== Possibly extinct =====
Common name	Scientific name	Range	Comments
Goldman's yellow rail	Coturnicops noveboracensis goldmani	Lerma River, Mexico	Last recorded in 1964.

==== Cranes (family Gruidae) ====
Common name	Scientific name	Range	Comments
Page's crane	Grus pagei	Rancho La Brea, California	Most recent remains dated to 10250-9180 BCE (uncalibrated date).

=== Shorebirds (order Charadriiformes) ===
==== Plovers, dotterels, and lapwings (family Charadriidae) ====
Scientific name	Range	Comments
Vanellus downsi	Rancho La Brea, California	Most recent remains dated to 38050-8050 BCE (uncalibrated date).

==== Sandpipers (family Scolopacidae) ====
===== Possibly extinct =====
Common name	Scientific name	Range	Comments	Pictures
Eskimo curlew	Numenius borealis	Americas	Last confirmed record in Nebraska in 1987; an unconfirmed sighting happened in Manitoba in 1996. Declined due to hunting, conversion of prairies for agriculture, and the suppression of the fire regime. The breeding grounds in the Arctic have since been taken over by the larger Hudsonian whimbrel. Another factor may have been the extinction of the Rocky Mountain locust.	

==== Auks (family Alcidae) ====
Common name	Scientific name	Range	Comments	Pictures
Great auk	Pinguinus impennis	Northern Atlantic and western Mediterranean. North American range included breeding in Canada and Greenland, and wintering in New England.	Last recorded off the Newfoundland Banks in 1852. It was hunted to extinction.	

=== Albatrosses and petrels (order Procellariiformes) ===
==== Northern storm petrels (family Hydrobatidae) ====
===== Possibly extinct =====
Common name	Scientific name	Range	Comments	Pictures
Guadalupe storm-petrel	Hydrobates macrodactylus	Guadalupe Island, Mexico	Last recorded in 1912. Likely extinct due to breeding habitat degradation by introduced feral goats and predation by feral cats and dogs; however the natural difficulty of its detection, lack of thorough surveys in the breeding season after 1906 and reports of unidentified storm-petrel calls at night may indicate that it is still extant.	

=== Storks and allies (order Ciconiiformes) ===
==== Storks (family Ciconiidae) ====
Common name	Scientific name	Range	Comments	Pictures
Asphalt stork	Ciconia maltha	Americas	Most recent remains dated to 9050-8050 BCE (uncalibrated date).	

=== New World vultures (order Cathartiformes) ===
==== New World vultures and condors (family Cathartidae) ====
Common name	Scientific name	Range	Comments	Pictures
Painted vulture	Sarcoramphus sacra	Florida	Hypothetical species known from a 1774 description by William Bartram. Though traditionally dismissed as a hoax or incorrect description of a king vulture from Central and South America (S. papa), which it resembled in everything except the tail's coloration and more predatory behavior, a 1734 account of the same bird and painting by Eleazar Albin, and a 1786 depiction of the tail feathers as part of a standard used by the Muscogee king Mico Chlucco suggest that it was an actual extirpated Floridan population of the king vulture, subspecies, or related species.	

===== Extinct in the wild =====
Common name	Scientific name	Range	Comments	Pictures
California condor	Gymnogyps californianus	North America	Extinct in the wild in 1987 and reintroduced in 1992.	

==== Teratorns (family Teratornithidae) ====
Common name	Scientific name	Range	Comments	Pictures
Slender teratorn	Cathartornis gracilis	Southern California	Most recent remains dated to 38050-8050 BCE (uncalibrated date).	
Merriam's teratorn	Teratornis merriami	Southern California to northern Arizona	Most recent remains dated to 9050-8050 BCE (uncalibrated date).	

=== Hawks and relatives (order Accipitriformes) ===
==== Hawks, eagles, kites, harriers and Old World vultures (family Accipitridae) ====
Common name	Scientific name	Range	Comments	Pictures
Daggett's eagle	Buteogallus daggetti	Southwestern United States and Nuevo León, Mexico	Most recent remains dated to 10250-9180 BCE (uncalibrated date).	
Woodward's eagle	Buteogallus woodwardi	California to Florida and the Caribbean	Most recent remains dated to 38050-8050 BCE (uncalibrated date).	
American Neophron	Neophrontops americanus	Rancho La Brea, California	Most recent remains dated to 10230-7630 BCE (uncalibrated date).	
Grinnell's hawk-eagle	Spizaetus grinnelli	Rancho La Brea, California	Most recent remains dated to 10250-9180 BCE (uncalibrated date).	

=== Owls (order Strigiformes) ===
==== True owls (family Strigidae) ====
Common name	Scientific name	Range	Comments	Pictures
Socorro elf owl	Micrathene whitneyi graysoni	Socorro Island, Mexico	Last recorded around 1970. Likely extinct due to predation by introduced cats.	
La Brea owl	Oraristrix brea	Southern California	Most recent remains dated to 10250-9180 BCE (uncalibrated date).	(center)

=== Falcons (order Falconiformes) ===
==== Falcons and caracaras (family Falconidae) ====
Common name	Scientific name	Range	Comments	Pictures
Guadalupe caracara	Caracara lutosa	Guadalupe Island, Mexico	Deliberately exterminated by settlers in 1903.	

=== Woodpeckers and allies (order Piciformes) ===
==== Woodpeckers (family Picidae) ====
Common name	Scientific name	Range	Comments	Pictures
Guadalupe flicker	Colaptes auratus rufipileus	Guadalupe Island, Mexico	Last collected in 1906. Extinct due to habitat destruction by introduced goats and predation by cats.	

===== Possibly extinct =====
Common name	Scientific name	Range	Comments	Pictures
Imperial woodpecker	Campephilus imperialis	North-central Mexico	Last confirmed record in Durango in 1956, but unconfirmed sightings continued until 2005 in the Copper Canyon of Chihuahua. Declined due to habitat destruction and poisoning by loggers, along with hunting for sport, food, and traditional medicine.	
American ivory-billed woodpecker	Campephilus principalis principalis	Southern United States	Last confirmed record in north-eastern Louisiana in 1944. Several unconfirmed sightings, video and sound records were made in eastern Arkansas in 2004, the Choctawhatchee River in Florida in 2005-2007, and 2006-2007 in Louisiana. Declined due to hunting, logging and forest clearance for agriculture.	

=== Parrots (order Psittaciformes) ===
==== Holotropical parrots (family Psittacidae) ====
Common name	Scientific name	Range	Comments	Pictures
Carolina parakeet	Conuropsis carolinensis	Eastern and Central United States	Last collected in the wild near Lake Okeechobee, Florida in 1904 though unconfirmed reports continued until the 1930s. The last captive individual died in Cincinnati Zoo in 1918. Declined due to hunting, persecution by crop farmers, deforestation, and competition with introduced bees.	

=== Perching birds (order Passeriformes) ===
==== True finches (family Fringillidae) ====
Common name	Scientific name	Range	Comments
McGregor's house finch	Carpodacus mexicanus mcgregori	San Benito and Cedros Islands, Mexico	Last recorded in 1938.

==== Thrashers, mockingbirds, tremblers, and New World catbirds (family Mimidae) ====
===== Possibly extinct =====
Common name	Scientific name	Range	Comments	Pictures
Cozumel thrasher	Toxostoma guttatum	Cozumel, Mexico	Last recorded in 2004.	

==== New World blackbirds (family Icteridae) ====
Common name	Scientific name	Range	Comments	Pictures
Large-billed black bird	Euphagus magnirostris	California to Venezuela and Peru	Most recent remains dated to 8800-8300 BCE (uncalibrated date).	
Convex-billed cowbird	Pandanaris convexa	California and Florida to Peru	Most recent remains dated to 38050-8050 BCE (uncalibrated date).	
Thick-billed cowbird	Pyelorhamphus molothroides	Shelter Cave, New Mexico	Most recent remains dated to 29300-9380 BCE (uncalibrated date).	
Slender-billed grackle	Quiscalus palustris	Lerma River and Xochimilco, Mexico	Last collected in 1910. Extinct due to the draining of its marsh habitat.	

==== New World sparrows (family Passerellidae) ====
Common name	Scientific name	Range	Comments	Pictures
Todos Santos rufous-crowned sparrow	Aimophila ruficeps sanctorum	Todos Santos Island, Mexico	Last recorded in the 1970s. Extinct due to habitat destruction by introduced rabbits and predation by introduced cats.	
Dusky seaside sparrow	Ammospiza maritima nigrescens	Merritt Island and Titusville, Florida	Declined due to DDT use in marshes and habitat loss caused by dam construction. In 1981 the last five individuals, all male, were captured and taken into captivity. However, a proposed plan to hybridize them with Scott's seaside sparrow and select the offspring with most dusky ancestry wasn't allowed because of legal restrictions against hybridizing endangered taxa. The last individual died in Walt Disney World's Discovery Island Zoological Park in Orlando, Florida in 1987.	
Los Angeles towhee	Pipilo angelensis	Rancho La Brea, California	Most recent remains dated to 38050-8050 BCE (uncalibrated date).	
Guadalupe towhee	Pipilo maculatus consobrinus	Guadalupe Island, Mexico	Last recorded in 1897. Extinct due to destruction of nesting habitat by introduced goats, and predation by cats.	
Zacatecas Worthen's sparrow	Spizella wortheni browni	Northwest Zacatecas, Mexico	Last recorded in 1961. Extinct due to habitat loss to agriculture, overgrazing and erosion by cattle herding, and decline of native herbivores which maintained the bird's habitat.	

==== Wrens (family Troglodytidae) ====
Common name	Scientific name	Range	Comments
San Benedicto rock wren	Salpinctes obsoletus exsul	San Benedicto Island, Mexico	Wiped out by the eruption of El Boquerón volcano in 1952.
Guadalupe wren	Thryomanes bewickii brevicauda	Guadalupe Island, Mexico	Last recorded in 1897. Extinct due to habitat destruction by introduced goats.
San Clemente wren	Thryomanes bewickii leucophrys	San Clemente Island, California	Last recorded in 1968. Extinct due to habitat destruction by introduced goats and sheep.

==== New World warblers (family Parulidae) ====
===== Possibly extinct =====
Common name	Scientific name	Range	Comments	Pictures
Bachman's warbler	Vermivora bachmanii	Southeastern United States and Cuba	Last recorded in Louisiana in 1988. Declined due to habitat loss caused by deforestation and marshland draining, followed by intensive hunting by bird collectionists as it became rare.	

== Reptiles (class Reptilia) ==
=== Turtles and tortoises (order Testudines) ===
==== Mud and musk turtles (family Kinosternidae) ====
Common name	Scientific name	Range	Comments
Viesca mud turtle	Kinosternon hirtipes megacephalum	Viesca Lake, southwestern Coahuila, Mexico	Only known from the type series collected in 1961. The lake has since been drained by humans.

==== Tortoises (family Testudinidae) ====
Common name	Scientific name	Range	Comments	Picture
Southeastern giant tortoise	Hesperotestudo crassiscutata	Southern United States	Most recent remains dated to around 9515 BCE.	
Wilson's tortoise	Hesperotestudo wilsoni	Southwestern United States	Most recent remains dated to around 9050 BCE.	

== Amphibians (class Amphibia) ==
=== Toads and frogs (order Anura) ===
==== True toads (family Bufonidae) ====
Common name	Scientific name	Range	Comments	Pictures
Chiriqui harlequin frog	Atelopus chiriquiensis	Talamanca-Chiriqui Mountains, Costa Rica	Last recorded in 1996. Extinct due to chytridiomycosis caused by the fungus Batrachochytrium dendrobatidis.	
Pass stubfoot toad	Atelopus senex	Central Costa Rica	Last recorded in 1986. Extinct due to chytridiomycosis.	
Golden toad	Incilius periglenes	Monteverde Cloud Forest Reserve, Costa Rica	Last recorded in 1989. Probably extinct due to climate change, chytridiomycosis, and airborne pollution.	

===== Extinct in the wild =====
Common name	Scientific name	Range	Comments	Pictures
Wyoming toad	Anaxyrus baxteri	Laramie Basin, Wyoming	Survives only at the four-times impounded Mortenson Lake National Wildlife Refuge, where it last reproduced naturally in 1991 and is re-stocked annually with captive born toadlets. The species is affected by chytridiomycosis, bacteria, pesticides, irrigation practices, lack of genetic diversity, predation by mustelids, drought, increased salinity, and expansion of the salt cedar which reduces habitat suitability.	
Panamanian golden frog	Atelopus zeteki	El Valle de Antón and Cerro Campana, Panama	Last recorded in the wild in 2009. The species is mainly threatened by chytridiomycosis, but also deforestation, water pollution, collection for the pet trade, and increased sedimentation of streams caused by road construction.	

==== Freshbelly frogs (family Craugastoridae) ====
Scientific name	Range	Comments
Craugastor myllomyllon	Finca Volcán, Alta Verapaz, Guatemala	Last recorded in 1978. Its natural habitat was destroyed by agriculture.

===== Possibly extinct =====
Common name	Scientific name	Range	Comments
McCranie's robber frog	Craugastor chrysozetetes	La Ceiba, Atlántida Department, Honduras	Last recorded in 1989. Possibly extinct due to catastrophic landslides caused by Hurricane Mitch, or chytridiomycosis.

==== Poison dart frogs (family Dendrobatidae) ====
Common name	Scientific name	Range	Comments	Pictures
Splendid poison frog	Oophaga speciosa	Western Panama	Last recorded in 1992. Extinct due to chytridiomycosis.	

==== Tree frogs and allies (family Hylidae) ====
===== Possibly extinct =====
Common name	Scientific name	Range	Comments	Pictures
Rabbs' fringe-limbed treefrog	Ecnomiohyla rabborum	El Valle de Antón, Panama	Last recorded in the wild in 2008, two years after chytridiomycosis invaded its natural habitat. The last captive animal, a male named Toughie, died at the Atlanta Botanical Garden in 2016.	

=== Salamanders and newts (order Urodela) ===
==== Lungless salamanders (family Plethodontidae) ====
Common name	Scientific name	Range	Comments
Ainsworth's salamander	Plethodon ainsworthi	Jasper County, Mississippi	Last recorded in 1964. Possibly extinct due to deforestation.
Jalpa false brook salamander	Pseudoeurycea exspectata	Cerro Miramundo, Jalapa, Guatemala	Last recorded in 1976. Possibly extinct due to habitat loss to farming and logging.

== Ray-finned fish (class Actinopterygii) ==
=== Carps, barbs, minnows, and allies (order Cypriniformes) ===
==== Suckers (family Catostomidae) ====
Common name	Scientific name	Range	Comments	Pictures
Snake River sucker	Chasmistes muriei	Jackson Lake, Wyoming and possibly the Snake River	Only known from the holotype collected in 1927. Likely extinct due to hybridization with the Utah sucker after the Jackson Lake Dam was built and blocked spawning migration.	
Harelip sucker	Lagochila lacera	Southeastern United States	Last collected in 1893. Though originally abundant and widely spread, the species inhabited only deep clearwater pools and fed almost entirely on molluscs. It likely became extinct due to increased siltation and turbidity caused by agriculture practices, which both reduced the number of molluscs and made them more difficult to find.	

==== Carps, barbs, and barbels (family Cyprinidae) ====
Common name	Scientific name	Range	Comments	Pictures
Maravillas red shiner	Cyprinella lutrensis blairi	Maravillas Creek, Texas	Last collected in 1954. Exterminated by introduced plains killifish.	
Mexican dace	Evarra bustamantei	Xochimilco-Tlahuac channels in the Valley of Mexico	Last collected in 1970. Likely extinct due to habitat destruction through pollution and water extraction.	
Plateau chub	Evarra eigenmanni	Chalco and Xochimilco-Tlahuac channels	Last collected in 1954. Likely extinct due to habitat destruction through pollution and water extraction.	
Endorheic chub	Evarra tlahuacensis	Lake Chalco in the Valley of Mexico	Last collected in 1970. Extinct due to habitat destruction and water pollution.	
Thicktail chub	Gila crassicauda	California Central Valley and San Francisco Bay	Last collected in 1957. Extinct due to the conversion of the Central Valley to intensive agriculture, marsh draining, channelization of rivers and introduction of extotic fish species.	
Pahranagat spinedace	Lepidomeda altivelis	Pahranagat Valley, Nevada	Last collected in 1938. Extinct due to predation by, and competition with the mosquitofish and other introduced species.	
Durango shiner	Notropis aulidion	Tunal River, Durango, Mexico	Last collected in 1961. Possibly extinct due to pollution, competition and predation by the largemouth bass and other introduced species.	
Salado shiner	Notropis saladonis	Salado River, Mexico	Not found in any sampling expeditions launched since 1988. The reasons of extinction are unknown.	
Rio Grande bluntnose shiner	Notropis simus simus	Upper Rio Grande and the Pecos River	Last collected in 1964. Possibly extinct due to changes in the water flow caused by dams, irrigation, and channelization, along with competition from introduced species.	
Phantom shiner	Notropis orca	Rio Grande	The only pure individual known is the holotype taken in 1975, though hybrids with the bluntnose shiner are known as far as 1891. Possibly extinct due to changes to the water flow (which increased hybridization), increased salinity caused by irrigation, and introduced fish species.	
Clear Lake splittail	Pogonichthys ciscoides	Clear Lake and its tributaries, California	Last collected in 1970. Extinct due to extreme eutrophication of the lake caused by agriculture.	
Banff longnose dace	Rhinichthys cataractae smithi	Banff National Park, Alberta	Extinct since 1986. Declined after the introduction of several exotic species including mosquitofishes, sailfin mollies, guppies, convict cichlids, and green swordtails, followed by the alteration of water flows related to the use of hotsprings as public baths and sewage spillage. As numbers fell the subspecies became more vulnerable to hybridization with R. c. cataractae, which caused its final extinction.	
Las Vegas dace	Rhinichthys deaconi	Las Vegas Valley, Nevada	Last collected in 1940. The springs it inhabited were destroyed during the urban development of Las Vegas.	
Grass Valley speckled dace	Rhinichthys osculus reliquus	Lander County, Nevada	Known only from the type series of 474 specimens collected in 1938. Though abundant in this time, it was completely gone and replaced by introduced rainbow trout and brook trout when a second collection attempt was made in 1969.	
Stumptooth minnow	Stypodon signifer	Southern Coahuila, Mexico	Last collected in 1903. It was a mollusc-eating specialist, and molluscs were greatly affected by habitat modification and pollution caused by agriculture.	

===== Extinct in the wild =====
Common name	Scientific name	Range	Comments
Ameca shiner	Notropis amecae	Ameca River, Jalisco, Mexico	Last found in the wild in 2008. Captive individuals were reintroduced in 2016, but it is unclear if the new population is viable. The exact cause of extinction is unknown, but habitat loss due to water extraction has been suggested.

=== Catfishes (order Siluriformes) ===
==== Ictalurids (family Ictaluridae) ====
Common name	Scientific name	Range	Comments
Scioto madtom	Noturus trautmani	Big Darby Creek, Ohio	Last collected in 1957. The cause of extinction is unknown.

=== Salmon, trout and relatives (order Salmoniformes) ===
==== Salmon, trout and relatives (family Salmonidae) ====
Common name	Scientific name	Range	Comments	Pictures
Longjaw cisco	Coregonus alpenae	Lakes Erie, Michigan, and Huron	Last collected in Lake Erie in 1957, in Lake Michigan in 1967, and in Lake Huron in 1975. Extinct due to overfishing, predation by the sea lamprey which colonized the lakes in the 1940s, and hybridization with other ciscoes.	
Deepwater cisco	Coregonus johannae	Lakes Michigan and Huron	Last collected in Lake Michigan in 1951, and in Lake Huron in 1952. Extinct due to overfishing, sea lamprey predation, and hybridization with other ciscoes.	
Lake Ontario kiyi	Coregonus kiyi orientalis	Lake Ontario	Last collected in 1964. Extinct due to overfishing, introduced fishes, and deterioration of water quality caused by eutrophication and chemical pollution.	
Blackfin cisco	Coregonus nigripinnis	Lakes Michigan and Huron	Last collected in 1923 in Lake Huron, and 1969 in Lake Michigan. Extinct due to overfishing, sea lamprey predation, and hybridization with other ciscoes.	
Yellowfin cutthroat trout	Oncorhynchus clarkii macdonaldi	Twin Lakes, Colorado	Extinct around 1910 as a result of competition and hybridization with introduced fishes.	
Alvord cutthroat trout	Oncorhynchus clarki ssp.	Alvord Basin in Oregon and Nevada	Only known from individuals hybridized with the rainbow trout, which was introduced to the area in the early 1930s.	
Silver trout	Salvelinus agassizi	Dublin Pond and Christine Lake, New Hampshire	Last recorded in Christine Lake in 1926 and in Dublin Pond in 1930. Extinct due to overfishing and several exotic fish introductions.	

===== Possibly extinct =====
Common name	Scientific name	Range	Comments	Pictures
Shortnose cisco	Coregonus reighardi	Lakes Michigan, Ontario, and Huron	Last collected in 1985. Declined due to overfishing and sea lamprey predation.	

=== Silversides (order Atheriniformes) ===
==== Neotropical silversides (family Atherinopsidae) ====
===== Possibly extinct =====
Common name	Scientific name	Range	Comments
Alberca silverside	Chirostoma bartoni	La Alberca caldera, Lerma River basin, Mexico	Not recorded after the crater lake dried during a drought in 2006.
Least silverside	Chirostoma charari	La Mintzita spring, Michoacan, Mexico	Last recorded in 1957. Declined due to overuse of water resources, deforestation of gallery forests, pollution, hypereutophication, and hybridization with other Chirostoma species.

=== Toothcarps (order Cyprinodontiformes) ===
==== Pupfishes (family Cyprinodontidae) ====
Common name	Scientific name	Range	Comments	Pictures
Santa Cruz pupfish	Cyprinodon arcuatus	Santa Cruz River, Arizona	Last recorded at Monkey Spring in 1971. Extinct due to predation by introduced largemouth bass.	
Villa Lopez pupfish	Cyprinodon ceciliae	Bolsón de Sandía, Nuevo León, Mexico	Last recorded in 1988. The spring it was endemic dried completely in 1991 as a consequence of water extraction for agriculture use.	
Cachorrito de la Trinidad	Cyprinodon inmemoriam	Ojo La Trinidad, northern Mexico	Only known from the holotype collected in 1984. The spring it was found in was destroyed by water extraction.	
Tecopa pupfish	Cyprinodon nevadensis calidae	Tecopa Hot Springs, California	Last recorded before 1972.	
Catarina pupfish	Megupsilon aporus	El Potosí, Galeana, Nuevo León, Mexico	Started declining in the 1980s due to predation by introduced Florida bass and water extraction, until total disappearance from the wild by 1994. In 1995, the El Potosí spring dried completely due to water extraction. A captive population of several hundred survived in Mexico, the United States, Spain, and Germany, but crashed in 2011 due to the death of most individuals from mycobacteriosis. In 2012, the last two males were hybridized with Potosi pupfish in the Children's Aquarium at Fair Park, Dallas, Texas, but all individuals born were females with mycobacteriosis. The last fish died in 2014.	

===== Possibly extinct =====
Common name	Scientific name	Range	Comments
Parras pupfish	Cyprinodon latifasciatus	Parras drainage basin, Coahuila, Mexico	Last collected in 2012. Declined due to pollution, introduced guppies and green swordtails.

===== Extinct in the wild =====
Common name	Scientific name	Range	Comments
Potosi pupfish	Cyprinodon alvarezi	Potosí Spring, Galeana, Nuevo León, Mexico	Last recorded in the wild in 1994. Declined due to near total habitat loss as a result of groundwater extraction, predation and competition with introduced species.
La Palma pupfish	Cyprinodon longidorsalis	Bolsón de Sandía, Nuevo León, Mexico	Last recorded in the wild in 1994, as a result of groundwater extraction.
Charco Palma pupfish	Cyprinodon veronicae	Bolsón de Sandía, Nuevo León, Mexico	Disappeared from the wild in 1995 as a result of groundwater extraction, which caused in 1997 the complete drying of the spring it was endemic to.

==== Topminnows and North American killifishes (family Fundulidae) ====
Common name	Scientific name	Range	Comments	Pictures
Whiteline topminnow	Fundulus albolineatus	Spring Creek, Huntsville, Alabama	Last collected in 1889. Probably extinct due to habitat degradation through channelization and construction, water extraction for urban use, or introduced common carp and goldfish.	

==== Splitfins (family Goodeidae) ====
Common name	Scientific name	Range	Comments	Pictures
Parras characodon	Characodon garmani	Southern Coahuila, Mexico	Known only from the holotype collected around the 1880s. Likely extinct due to habitat alteration.	
Raycraft Ranch killifish	Empetrichthys latos concavus	Pahrump Valley, Nevada	Last collected in 1953. Likely extinct due to introduced carp and bullfrogs; after its probable extinction, the spring it was endemic to was filled to eliminate mosquitos.	
Pahrump Ranch poolfish	Empetrichthys latos pahrump	Nye County, Nevada	Last recorded in 1958. Likely extinct due to excessive water extraction, introduced carp and bullfrogs.	
Ash Meadows killifish	Empetrichthys merriami	Ash Meadows, Nevada	Last collected in 1948. Likely extinct due to habitat alteration and predation by introduced bullfrogs and crayfish.	

===== Extinct in the wild =====
Common name	Scientific name	Range	Comments	Pictures
Banded allotoca	Allotoca goslinei	Jalisco, Mexico	Last recorded in the wild in 2004. Declined rapidly from 2000 after green swordtails were introduced in its last known location.	
Golden skiffia	Skiffia francesae	Teuchitlan River and Laguna de Sayula, Jalisco, Mexico	Declined due to habitat degradation and exotic fish introductions. The last known wild population disappeared when the El Molino pond dried during a drought in 2010.	

==== Poeciliids (family Poeciliidae) ====
Common name	Scientific name	Range	Comments
Amistad gambusia	Gambusia amistadensis	Goodenough Spring, Texas	Endemic to a spring flooded by a dam in 1969. In anticipation, several individuals were collected and kept in captivity, but all were found to be hybridized with mosquitofish after 1974.
San Marcos gambusia	Gambusia georgei	San Marcos River and spring, Texas	Last recorded in 1983. Extinct due to reduced spring flows, pollution, introduced fishes and ornamental plants, and hybridization with mosquitofish.

===== Possibly extinct =====
Common name	Scientific name	Range	Comments
Graceful priapella	Priapella bonita	Motzorongo River, Veracruz, Mexico	Last recorded in 1965. The cause of extinction is unknown.

===== Extinct in the wild =====
Common name	Scientific name	Range	Comments	Pictures
Monterrey platyfish	Xiphophorus couchianus	Atlantic slope of Mexico	Last collected in the wild in 1967. Declined due to habitat destruction, pollution, predation and competition with introduced species.	
Marbled swordtail	Xiphophorus meyeri	Melchor Muzquiz, Coahuila, Mexico	Last recorded in the wild in 1997. Declined due to water abstraction for mining activities.	

=== Lionfishes and sculpins (order Scorpaeniformes) ===
==== Cottids (family Cottidae) ====
Common name	Scientific name	Range	Comments
Utah Lake sculpin	Cottus echinatus	Utah Lake	Last collected in 1928. Extinct due to pollution, increased salinity, and decreasing water level caused by agriculture, as well as introduced fish species.

==== Sticklebacks (family Gasterosteidae) ====
Common name	Scientific name	Range	Comments
Hadley Lake sticklebacks	Gasterosteus spp.	Hadley Lake, British Columbia	Two undescribed species extinct in 1999. Other species of the same genus survive in the lake.

=== Perchs and allies (order Perciformes) ===
==== Perchs (family Percidae) ====
Common name	Scientific name	Range	Comments	Pictures
Maryland darter	Etheostoma sellare	Lower Susquehanna River, United States	Last confirmed record in 1986 and a possible one in 1988. Its range contracted after the damming of the Susquehanna; the last known location has degraded water quality caused by agriculture.	
Blue walleye	Sander vitreus glaucus	Lakes Ontario and Erie, and Niagara River	Population began to fluctuate wildly in 1915 as a result of over-fishing before it collapsed in 1958. The final individuals may have hybridized with walleye.	

== Malacostracans (class Malacostraca) ==
=== Isopods (order Isopoda) ===
==== Marine pillbugs (family Sphaeromatidae) ====
===== Extinct in the wild =====
Common name	Scientific name	Range	Comments	Pictures
Socorro isopod	Thermosphaeroma thermophilum	Sedillo Spring, Socorro County, New Mexico	The wild population died out in 1988 after a valve control system for surface discharge was installed in the spring and subsequently closed. Captive-bred animals were released in the same place in 1989, and further introduced to locations in New Mexico beginning in 1990.	

=== Decapods (order Decapoda) ===
==== Family Atyidae ====
Common name	Scientific name	Range	Comments
Pasadena freshwater shrimp	Syncaris pasadenae	Los Angeles River drainage basin, California	Last collected in 1933. Its habitat was destroyed by urbanization.

==== Family Astacidae ====
Common name	Scientific name	Range	Comments	Pictures
Sooty crayfish	Pacifastacus nigrescens	San Francisco Bay, California	Not recorded since the signal crayfish was introduced in the late 19th century.	

==== Family Cambaridae ====
Common name	Scientific name	Range	Comments
Alvarez's dwarf crayfish	Cambarellus alvarezi	Potosí Spring, Nuevo León, Mexico	Endemic to a spring that was drained by pumping groundwater in 1994.
Sandhills crayfish	Procambarus angustatus	Sand Hills, Georgia	Only known from the holotype collected in around 1856.

===== Possibly extinct =====
Common name	Scientific name	Range	Comments
White Spring cave crayfish	Cambarus veitchorum	White Spring Cave, Limestone County, Alabama	Last collected in 1968.
Bigcheek cave crayfish	Procambarus delicatus	Ocala National Forest, Lake County, Florida	Last recorded in 1976. Declined due to disturbance and pollution caused by tourism.

=== Amphipods (order Amphipoda) ===
==== Whale lice (family Cyamidae) ====
Scientific name	Range	Comments
Cyamus rhytinae	Bering Sea	Parasite of Steller's sea cow.

== Insects (class Insecta) ==
=== Mayflies (order Ephemeroptera) ===
==== Spiny-headed burrowing mayflies (family Palingeniidae) ====
Common name	Scientific name	Range	Comments
Robust burrowing mayfly	Pentagenia robusta	Ohio River area	Only known from the holotype collected in 1926. Likely sensitive to changes in water flow, quality, and sedimentation.

==== Family Acanthametropodidae ====
Common name	Scientific name	Range	Comments
Pecatonica River mayfly	Acanthometropus pecatonica	United States	Last recorded in 1927.

=== Stoneflies (order Plecoptera) ===
==== Green stoneflies (family Chloroperlidae) ====
Common name	Scientific name	Range
Robert's stonefly	Alloperla roberti	Illinois

=== Grasshoppers, crickets, and katydids (order Orthoptera) ===
==== Short-horned grasshoppers (family Acrididae) ====
Common name	Scientific name	Range	Comments	Pictures
Central Valley grasshopper	Conozoa hyalina	Central Valley, California	Last recorded before 1953.	
Rocky Mountain locust	Melanoplus spretus	Western and central Canada and United States	Last collected in 1902. Possibly extinct due to destruction of its riparian breeding habitat in the northern Rocky Mountains.	

==== Katydids (family Tettigoniidae) ====
Common name	Scientific name	Range	Comments
Antioch Dunes shieldback katydid	Neduba extincta	United States	Last recorded in 1937.

=== Book lice, bark lice, and sucking lice (order Psocodea) ===
==== Chicken body lice (family Menoponidae) ====
Common name	Scientific name	Range	Comments
California condor louse	Colpocephalum californici	North America	Conservation-induced extinctions produced when the last California condors were taken into captivity and deloused in the mid-1980s.
Second unnamed species of California condor lice	Colpocephalum sp. nov.	North America	Conservation-induced extinctions produced when the last California condors were taken into captivity and deloused in the mid-1980s.
Guadalupe storm petrel louse	Longimenopon dominicanum	Guadalupe Island, Mexico	Parasite of the Guadalupe storm petrel.

===== Possibly extinct =====
Scientific name	Range	Comments
Austromenopon confine	Americas	Parasite of the slender-billed curlew.

==== Bird chewing lice (family Philopteridae) ====
Scientific name	Range	Comments
Acutifrons caracarensis	Guadalupe Island, Mexico	Parasite of the Guadalupe caracara, co-extinct with its host.

===== Possibly extinct =====
Scientific name	Range	Comments
Cummingsiella breviclypeata	Americas	Parasite of the slender-billed curlew.

==== Mammal lice (family Trichodectidae) ====
===== Possibly extinct =====
Common name	Scientific name	Range	Comments
Ferret louse	Neotrichodectes sp.	Great Plains	Possibly a related, but different species to the weasel louse (N. minutus), disappeared when the last black-footed ferrets were taken into captivity and deloused.

=== Beetles (order Coleoptera) ===
==== True weevils (family Curculionidae) ====
Common name	Scientific name	Range	Comments
Fort Ross weevil	Trigonoscuta rossi	Fort Ross, California	Last recorded in 1975. The cause of extinction is unknown.
Yorba Linda weevil	Trigonoscuta yorbalindae	Yorba Linda desert dunes, California	Last recorded in 1975. Its habitat was destroyed by urbanization.

=== Butterflies and moths (order Lepidoptera) ===
==== Pygmy moths and midget moths (family Nepticulidae) ====
Common name	Scientific name	Range	Comments
Phleophagan chestnut moth	Ectoedemia phleophaga	United States	Last recorded in the 1900s.

==== Trumpet leaf-miner moths (family Tischeriidae) ====
Common name	Scientific name	Range
Chestnut clearwing moth	Tischeria perplexa	United States

==== Shiny head-standing moths (family Argyresthiidae) ====
Common name	Scientific name	Range	Comments
Chestnut ermine moth	Argyresthia castaneella	United States	Last recorded in 1923.

==== Gossamer-winged butterflies (family Lycaenidae) ====
Common name	Scientific name	Range	Comments	Pictures
Xerces blue	Glaucopsyche xerces	San Francisco, California, United States	Last collected in 1941.	

==== Grass moths (family Crambidae) ====
Scientific name	Range	Comments
Oeobia sp. nov.	United States	Last recorded in 1911.

=== Caddisflies (order Trichoptera) ===
==== Long-horned caddisflies (family Leptoceridae) ====
Common name	Scientific name	Range	Comments
Athens caddisfly	Triaenodes phalacris	United States	
Three-toothed caddisfly	Triaenodes tridontus	United States	Last recorded in 1991.

==== Family Rhyacophilidae ====
Common name	Scientific name	Range
Castle Lake caddisfly	Rhyacophila amabilis	United States

== Arachnids (class Arachnida) ==
=== Order Mesostigmata ===
==== Family Halarachnidae ====
Common name	Scientific name	Range	Comments	Pictures
Caribbean monk seal nasal mite	Halarachne americana	Caribbean Sea	Extinct with its host.	

=== Order Sarcoptiformes ===
==== Family Analgidae ====
Scientific name	Range	Comments
Diplaegidia gladiator	Eastern North America	Parasite of the passenger pigeon which is coextinct.

==== Family Psoroptoididae ====
Scientific name	Range	Comments
Chiasmalges carolinensis	Eastern and central United States	Parasite of the Carolina parakeet.

==== Family Pterolichidae ====
Scientific name	Range	Comments
Genoprotolichus simplex	Eastern and central United States	Parasites of the Carolina parakeet.
Lopharalichus beckeri	Eastern and central United States	Parasites of the Carolina parakeet.
Neorhytidelasma conuropsis	Eastern and central United States	Parasites of the Carolina parakeet.

==== Family Pteronyssidae ====
Scientific name	Range	Comments
Pterotrogus principalis	Southern United States and Cuba	Parasite of the ivory-billed woodpecker which is coextinct.

==== Family Xolalgidae ====
Scientific name	Range	Comments
Fainalges gracilitarsus	Eastern and central United States	Parasites of the Carolina parakeet.
Protonyssus proctorae	Eastern and central United States	Parasites of the Carolina parakeet.

== Snails and slugs (class Gastropoda) ==
=== Mud snails (family Hydrobiidae) ===
Common name	Scientific name	Range	Comments	Pictures
Beaver pond marstonia	Marstonia castor	Lake Blackshear, Georgia	Pollution and urban development.	
Olive marstonia	Marstonia olivacea	Big Spring Creek, Madison County, Alabama	Extinct in the 1960s due to impoundment in the Tennessee Valley.	
Corded pyrg	Pyrgulopsis nevadensis	Nevada	Believed to be found exclusively in Pyramid Lake Nevada.	

=== Family Lithoglyphidae ===
Common name	Scientific name	Range	Comments	Pictures
Cahaba pebblesnail	Clappia cahabensis	Cahaba River, Alabama	Unconfirmed last record in 2005.	
Umbilicate pebblesnail	Clappia umbilicata	Alabama		
Oachita pebblesnail	Somatogyrus amnicoloides	Arkansas		
Thick-lipped pebblesnail	Somatogyrus crassilabris	White River, Baxter County, Arkansas	Only known from the holotype collected in 1915.	
Tennessee pebblesnail	Somatogyrus currierianus	Alabama		
Channeled pebblesnail	Somatogyrus wheeleri	Arkansas		

=== Family Lottiidae ===
Common name	Scientific name	Range	Comments
Eelgrass limpet	Lottia alveus	Atlantic Canada and the United States	Went extinct in 1929 after wasting disease killed it's only food source.
Rocky shore limpet	Lottia edmitchelli	San Nicolas Island and Los Angeles, California	Last recorded in 1861. Extinct due to habitat loss.

=== Bladder snails (family Physidae) ===
Common name	Scientific name	Range
Fish Lake physa	Physella microstriata	Utah

=== Ramshorn snails (family Planorbidae) ===
Common name	Scientific name	Range	Comments	Pictures
Shoal sprite	Amphigyra alabamensis	Alabama		
Boulder snail	Athearnia crassa	Alabama, Georgia, Tennessee, and Virginia		
Carinate flat-top snail	Neoplanorbis carinatus	Alabama		
Angled flat-top snail	Neoplanorbis smithii	Alabama		
Little flat-top snail	Neoplanorbis tantillus	Coosa River, Alabama	Extinct due to several impoundments between 1914 and 1967.	
Umbilicate flat-top snail	Neoplanorbis umbilicatus	Alabama		
Acorn ramshell	Planorbella multivolvis	Michigan		

=== Pleurocerids (family Pleuroceridae) ===
Common name	Scientific name	Range
Short-spired elimia	Elimia brevis	Alabama
Closed elimia	Elimia clausa	St. Clair County, Alabama
Fusiform elimia	Elimia fusiformis	Coosa River, Alabama
Shouldered elimia	Elimia gibbera	Alabama
High-spired elimia	Elimia hartmaniana	United States
Constricted elimia	Elimia impressa	Alabama
Hearty elimia	Elimia jonesi	Coosa River, Alabama
Ribbed elimia	Elimia laeta	Alabama
Wrinkled elimia	Elimia macglameriana	Alabama and Georgia
Pupa elimia	Elimia pupaeformis	Alabama
Pygmy elimia	Elimia pygmaea	Alabama
Rough-lined elimia	Elimia pilsbryi	Coosa River, Alabama
Excised slitshell	Gyrotoma excisa	Last recorded in 1924.
Striate slitshell	Gyrotoma lewisii	Last recorded in 1924.
Pagoda slitshell	Gyrotoma pagoda	Last recorded in 1924.
Ribbed slitshell	Gyrotoma pumila	Last recorded in 1924.
Pyramid slitshell	Gyrotoma pyramidata	Last recorded in 1924.
Round slitshell	Gyrotoma walkeri	
Agate rocksnail	Leptoxis clipeata	Alabama
Maiden rocksnail	Leptoxis formosa	Alabama and Georgia
Rotund rocksnail	Leptoxis ligata	Alabama
Lyrate rocksnail	Leptoxis lirata	Alabama
Bigmouth rocksnail	Leptoxis occultata	Alabama
Coosa rocksnail	Leptoxis showalterii	United States
Squat rocksnail	Leptoxis torrefacta	United States
Striped rocksnail	Leptoxis vittata	United States

=== Horn snails (family Potamididae) ===
Scientific name	Range	Comments
Cerithidea fuscata	Northeast Pacific Ocean	Last recorded in 1935. Extinct due to overexploitation.

== Bivalves (class Bivalvia) ==
=== Order Unionida ===
==== Family Unionidae ====
Common name	Scientific name	Range	Comments	Pictures
Coosa elktoe	Alasmidonta mccordi	Coosa River, Alabama	Only known from the holotype collected in 1956. Presumed extinct when the Coosa River was impounded in 1964.	
Carolina elktoe	Alasmidonta robusta	North and South Carolina	Taxonomic status uncertain.	
Ochlockonee arcmussel	Alasmidonta wrightiana	Ochlockonee River, Florida	Extinct since the 1930s due to habitat fragmentation or degradation.	
Arc-form pearly mussel	Epioblasma arcaeformis	Cumberland and Tennessee River systems	Extinct since the 1940s due to loss of all habitat through impoundment or channelization.	
Angled riffleshell	Epioblasma biemarginata	Cumberland and Tennessee River systems	Extinct in 1970 due to habitat destruction.	
Arcuate pearly mussel	Epioblasma flexuosa	Tennessee, Cumberland, and Ohio River systems	Last collected in 1900. Likely extinct in the 1920s or 1930s, due to loss of habitat through impoundment or channelization.	
Curtis pearly mussel	Epioblasma florentina curtisii	Little Black River, Missouri	Extinct in the 1990s due to habitat degradation.	
Yellow blossom	Epioblasma florentina florentina	Holston River, Tennessee	Extinct in the 1940s due to loss of habitat through impoundment or channelization.	
Acorn pearly mussel	Epioblasma haysiana	Cumberland and Tennessee River systems	Extinct in 1970 due to habitat degradation and fragmentation.	
Stone's pearly mussel	Epioblasma lenior	Tennessee River system	Extinct in 1967 due to loss of habitat through impoundment or channelization.	
Lewis pearly mussel	Epioblasma lewisii	Cumberland and Tennessee River systems	Extinct in 1950 due to loss of habitat through impoundment or channelization.	
Upland combshell	Epioblasma metastriata	Conasauga River, Georgia	Extinct in 1980s due to habitat destruction and fragmentation.	
Southern acornshell	Epioblasma othcaloogensis	Conasauga River, Georgia	Extinct in the 1970s due to habitat destruction and fragmentation.	
Fine-rayed pearly mussel	Epioblasma personata	Tennessee, Ohio, and Wabash River systems	Last collected in 1924. Extinct in the 1920s or 1930s due to loss of habitat through impoundment or channelization.	
Nearby pearly mussel	Epioblasma propinqua	Tennessee, Cumberland, Ohio, and Wabash River systems	Last collected in 1901. Its habitat disappeared through impoundment or channelization in 1936.	
Sampson's pearly mussel	Epioblasma sampsonii	Kentucky, Illinois, and Indiana	Extinct in the 1930s or 1940s due to habitat destruction and fragmentation.	
Steward's pearly mussel	Epioblasma stewardsonii	Tennessee and Coosa River systems	Last collected in 1909. Its habitat disappeared in the 1940s due to impoundment or channelization.	
Green-blossom pearly mussel	Epioblasma torulosa gubernaculum	Tennessee River system	Last collected alive in 1984.	
Tubercled-blossom pearly mussel	Epioblasma torulosa torulosa	Tennessee and Ohio River systems	Last recorded in 1969. Extinct due to loss of all habitat through impoundment or channelization.	
Turgid-blossom pearly mussel	Epioblasma turgidula	Southern Appalachians and Cumberland Plateau	Last recorded in the Duck River, Tennessee in 1972. Extinct due to loss of all habitat through impoundment or channelization.	
Lined pocketbook	Lampsilis binominata	Flint River, Georgia	Extinct in the 1970s due to habitat degradation.	
Highnut	Pleurobema altum	United States		
Longnut	Pleurobema nucleopsis	United States		
Alabama clubshell	Pleurobema troschelianum	Alabama, Tennessee, and Georgia		
True pigtoe	Pleurobema verum	Alabama		
Black clubshell	Pleurobema curtum	East Fork Tombigbee River, Mississippi	Extinct in the 1990s due to habitat destruction and fragmentation.	
Flat pigtoe	Pleurobema marshalli	Tombigbee River, Mississippi and Alabama	Extinct in 1984 due to loss of all habitat through impoundment or channelization.	
Rio Grande monkeyface	Rotundaria couchiana	Rio Grande	Extinct in the early 1900s due to habitat degradation.	
Stirrup shell	Theliderma stapes	Sipsey River, Alabama	Extinct in the 1980s due to habitat fragmentation and destruction.	

== Roundworms (phylum Nematoda) ==
=== Order Rhabditida ===
==== Family Onchocercidae ====
Scientific name	Range	Comments
Agamofilaria oxyura	Rampart Cave, Arizona	Parasite of the Shasta ground sloth. Most recent remains dated to c. 9050 BCE.

==== Family Strongyloididae ====
Scientific name	Range	Comments
Strongyloides shastensis	Rampart Cave, Arizona	Parasite of the Shasta ground sloth. Most recent remains dated to c. 9050 BCE.

== Fungi (kingdom Fungi) ==
=== Gilled mushrooms (order Agaricales) ===
==== Thick-gilled mushrooms (family Hygrophoraceae) ====
===== Possibly extinct =====
Common name	Scientific name	Range	Comments
Timucua heart lichen	Cora timucua	Florida	Last recorded in 1985. Possibly extinct due to habitat destruction caused by deforestation, agriculture, and urban development.

== Plants (kingdom Plantae) ==
=== Mosses (division Bryophyta) ===
==== Neckera mosses (family Neckeraceae) ====
Common name	Scientific name	Range	Comments
Macoun's shining moss	Neomacounia nitida	Hastings County, Ontario	Last collected in 1864.

=== Flowering plants (division Angiospermae) ===
==== Sunflowers (family Asteraceae) ====
Common name	Scientific name	Range	Comments	Pictures
Appalachian Barbara's buttons	Marshallia grandiflora	Henderson and Polk Counties, North Carolina	Last recorded in 1919.	

==== Spiral gingers (family Costaceae) ====
===== Possibly extinct in the wild =====
Scientific name	Range	Comments
Costus vinosus	Central Panama toward the Caribbean	Last collected in 2004. Possibly extinct due to habitat destruction.

==== Legumes (family Fabaceae) ====
===== Possibly extinct =====
Scientific name	Range	Comments
Dalea sabinalis	Edwards Plateau, Texas	Last collected in 1944. Possibly extinct due to overgrazing and resort development.

==== Orchids (family Orchidaceae) ====
Common name	Scientific name	Range	Comments
Florida govenia	Govenia floridana	Long Pine Key, Everglades National Park, Florida	Last collected in 1964, when it was reduced to ten individuals. Likely extinct due to trampling and overcollection by collectionists.

==== Coffee and relatives (family Rubiaceae) ====
Scientific name	Range	Comments
Faramea chiapensis	Selva Negra, Chiapas, Mexico	Only known from the holotype collected in 1953, in an area that was later deforested.

==== Tea plants (family Theaceae) ====
===== Extinct in the wild =====
Common name	Scientific name	Range	Comments	Pictures
Franklin tree	Franklinia alatamaha	McIntosh County, Georgia	Last recorded in the wild in 1803.	

== See also ==
- List of Hawaiian animals extinct in the Holocene
- List of Antillian and Bermudan animals extinct in the Holocene
- List of South American animals extinct in the Holocene
- Holocene extinction
- Peopling of the Americas
- United States Fish and Wildlife Service
- IUCN Red List
