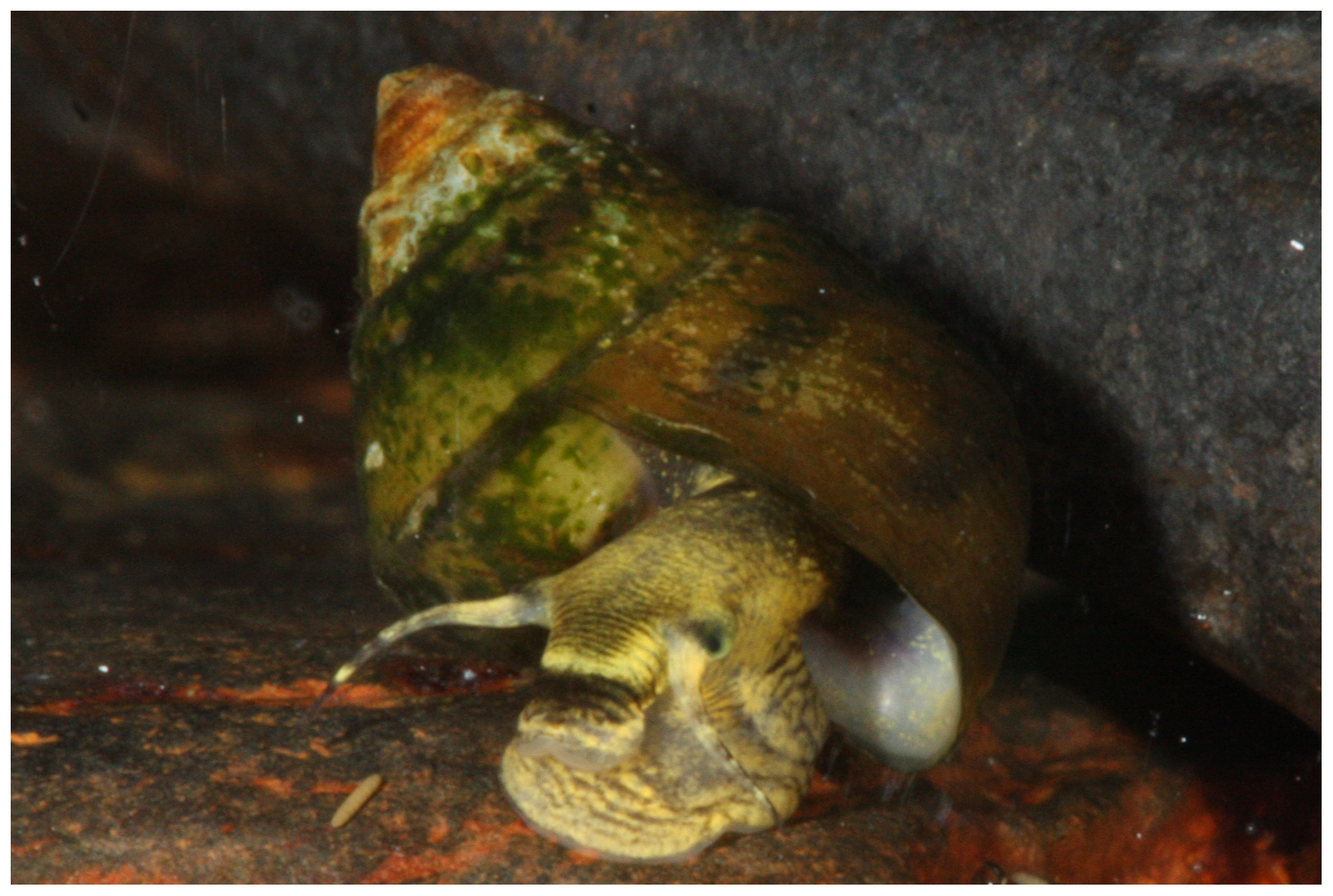
- A live individual of Leptoxis compacta

Conservation status
- Critically Imperiled (NatureServe)

Scientific classification
- Kingdom: Animalia
- Phylum: Mollusca
- Class: Gastropoda
- Subclass: Caenogastropoda
- Order: incertae sedis
- Family: Pleuroceridae
- Genus: Leptoxis
- Species: L. compacta

Binomial name
- Leptoxis compacta (Anthony, 1854)

Synonyms
- Melania compacta Anthony, 1854

= Leptoxis compacta =

Species of gastropod

Leptoxis compacta, the oblong rocksnail, is a species of freshwater snail with an operculum, an aquatic gastropod mollusk in the family Pleuroceridae.

This species is endemic to the Cahaba River in Alabama, United States. It was thought to be extinct due to habitat loss since it had not been collected since 1933, and was formally declared extinct in 2000. The IUCN Red List had previously listed it as critically endangered in 1996 but there was no survey data available at that time. It was rediscovered in a small section of its previously described habitat in the Cahaba River in 2011, with a formal report published in August 2012.

Molecular systematic analyses are underway to clarify the genetic position of Leptoxis compacta.

== Distribution ==
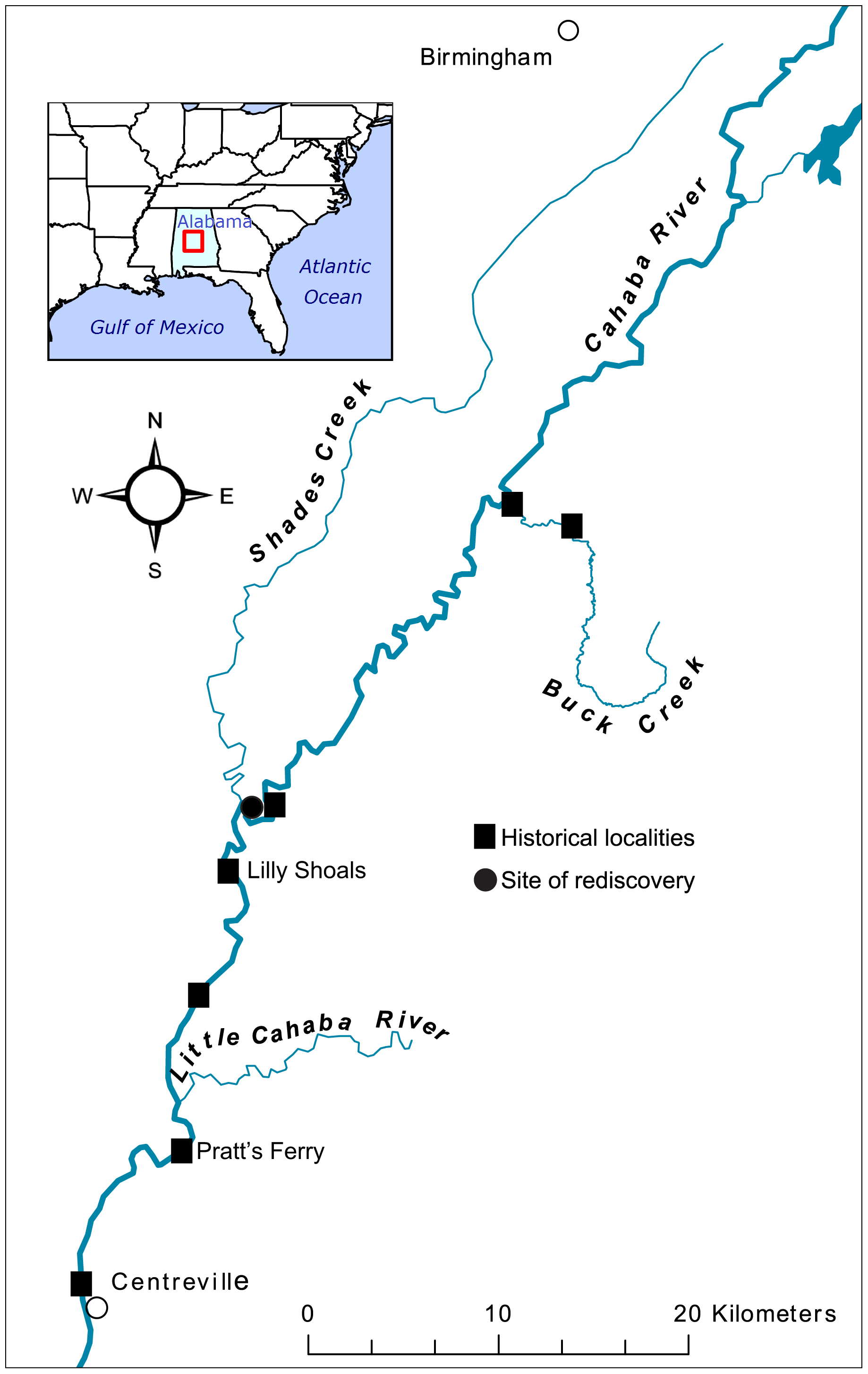
Distribution map of localities of Leptoxis compacta.

Leptoxis compacta is restricted to a single location in the Cahaba River, where it was rediscovered in 2011. It lives in an unnamed shoal upstream of the Cahaba River and Shades Creek confluence in Shelby County, Alabama.

Historically, Leptoxis compacta was most abundant in the central section of the Cahaba River at Lily Shoals in Bibb County, Alabama. The historical range of Leptoxis compacta extended from Centerville, Bibb County, upriver and into lower Buck Creek in the Valley and Ridge physiogeographic province of the southern Appalachian Mountains.

Specific reasons for the species decline of Leptoxis compacta have not been determined, but it is known that the species was declining in abundance and range by 1935, and it is suggested that factors contributing to the decline included its naturally small range and pollutant loadings to streams from mines and the Birmingham, Alabama metropolitan area.

This species was the only pleurocerid endemic to the Cahaba River that was considered extinct, and had not been found in surveys of the river conducted in 1992, 2005, and 2008.

This snail is highly susceptible to a single catastrophic extinction event. As such, the species deserves immediate conservation attention. Artificial propagation and reintroduction of Leptoxis compacta into its native range may be a viable recovery strategy to prevent extinction from a single perturbation event.

== Description ==
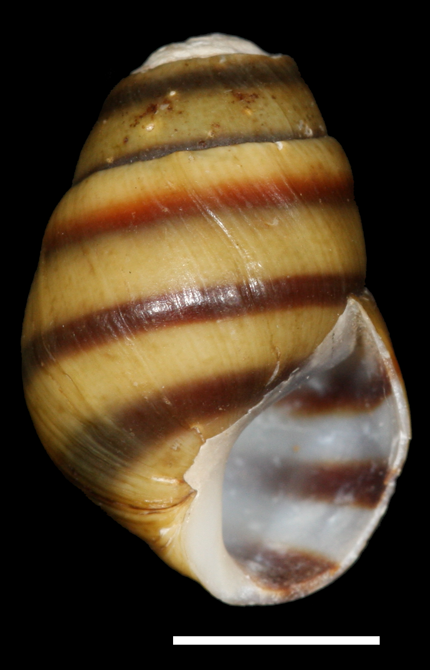
Leptoxis compacta lectotype. Scale bar is 5 mm.

This species was originally described by the American naturalist and malacologist John Gould Anthony in 1854.

The shell of Leptoxis compacta is ovate-conic, smooth, thick and yellowish-green. The spire is obtusely elevated. The shell has about five whorls, which is nearly flat. The body whorl is large, subangulated near the base, with three very dark bands, two of which are below the angle. The penultimate whorl has two bands only, and the lowest of these is nearly or quite concealed by the suture, and on the upper whorl the same band is indicated only by a dark, hair-like line. Sutures are well impressed. The aperture is rather large, ovate, within whitish and banded. The columella is strongly indented, base regularly rounded, without any sinus.

The width of the shell is 10 mm. The height of the shell is 15 mm. The height of the aperture is 7.5 mm.

Most specimens collected from the wild in 2011 had purple pigmentation on the columella indentation, but juveniles propagated in captivity did not have this feature. The external tissue pigmentation of Leptoxis compacta is yellow, mottled with black and includes prominent black bands in the middle of the proboscis and on both eyes. This pigmentation banding pattern is identical to sympatric Leptoxis ampla. Pigmentation patterns and the presence of an ocular peduncle are features that distinguish Leptoxis compacta from sympatric Elimia spp. including Elimia clara, which is conchologically most similar to Leptoxis compacta.

Juvenile Leptoxis compacta shells possess one distinct carina on the main body whorl, which is eventually lost as adults.

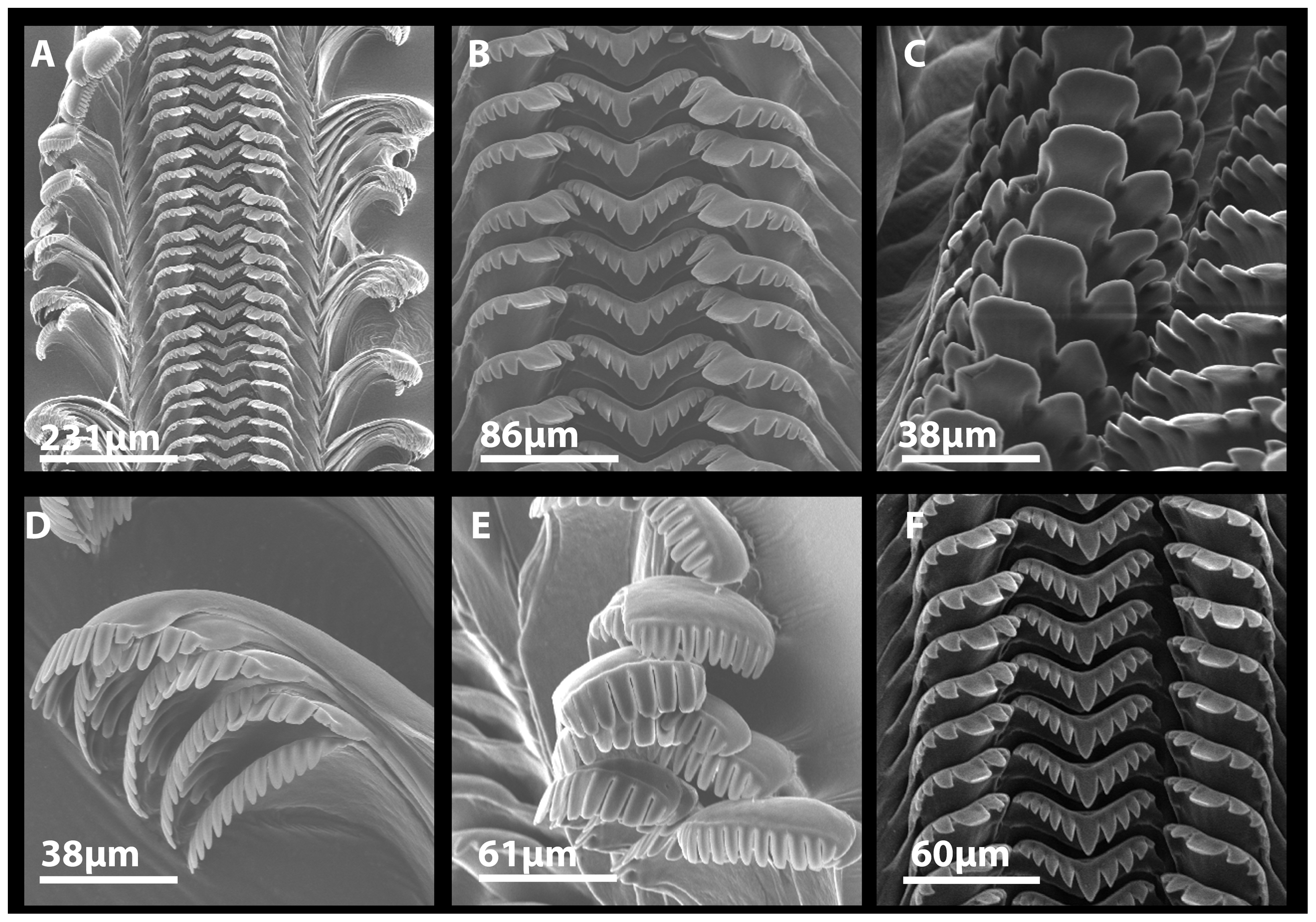
radula of Leptoxis compacta

The radular structure of Leptoxis compacta is described as including a rachidian tooth with a widely convex basal margin and a blunt central cusp flanked by four to five denticles, with the outermost being weakly developed in most cases. The lateral tooth contains one larger rectangular central cusp that is flanked by four to five outer denticles and three to four inner denticles. The inner marginal teeth contain 10 to 12 denticles, and the outer marginal teeth have 12 to 16 denticles. The outer denticles are often weakly developed.

== Ecology and life history ==
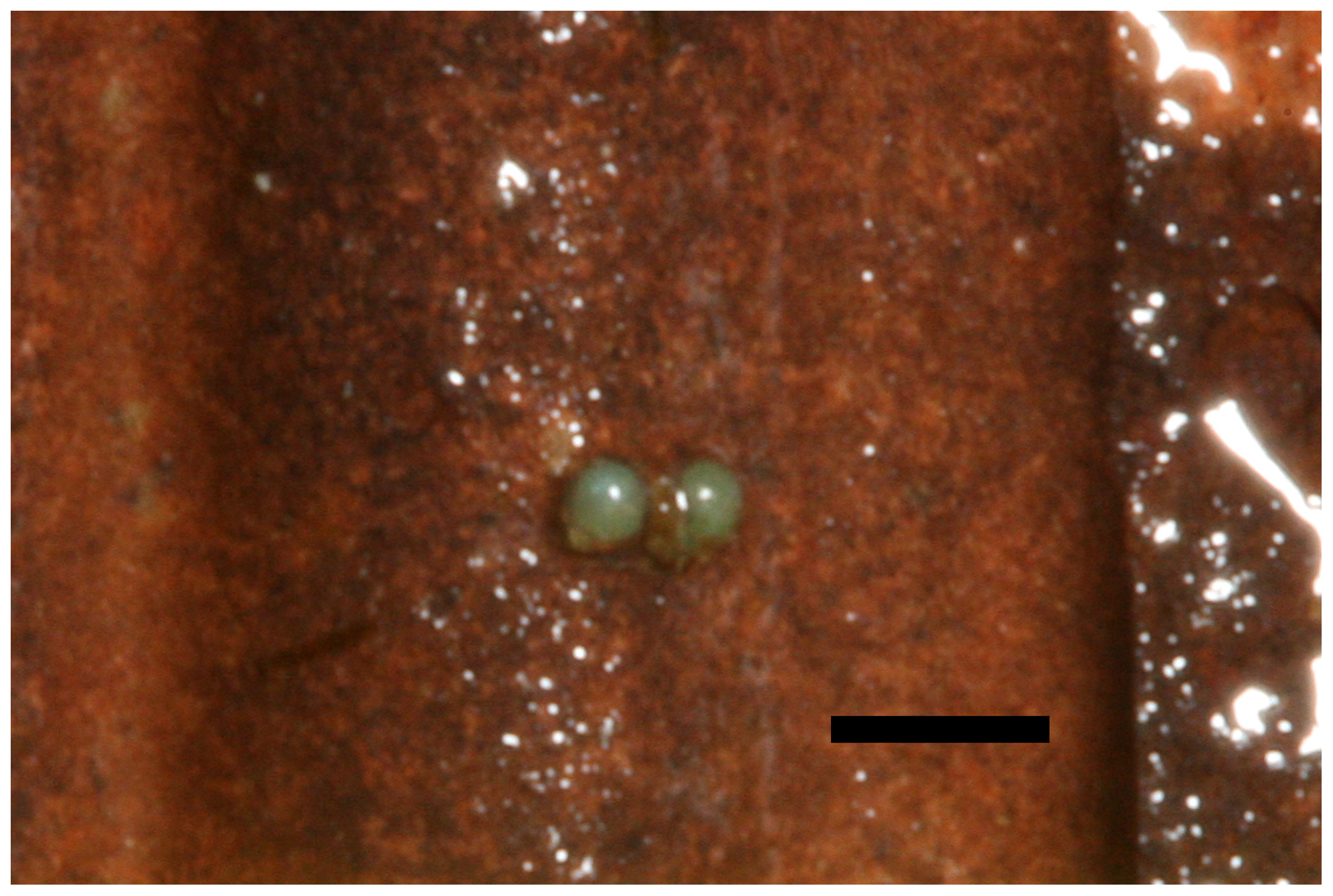
Two Leptoxis compacta eggs. Scale bar = 1 mm

Leptoxis compacta inhabits upstream shoals.

Reproductive behavior was observed on approximately 30 L. compacta individuals collected in 2011 and placed in captivity. Females laid eggs either singly or in short, single lines. Each egg was approximately 0.3 mm in diameter. Average length of the line of eggs was 1.57 eggs (n = 51 egg lines) with a maximum observed length of three eggs.
