= Spotted rocksnail =

Conservation status
- Vulnerable (IUCN 3.1)

- Imperiled (NatureServe)

Scientific classification
- Kingdom: Animalia
- Phylum: Mollusca
- Class: Gastropoda
- Subclass: Caenogastropoda
- Order: incertae sedis
- Family: Pleuroceridae
- Genus: Leptoxis
- Species: L. picta

Binomial name
- Leptoxis picta (Conrad, 1834)

Synonyms
- Leptoxis taeniata

Species of gastropod

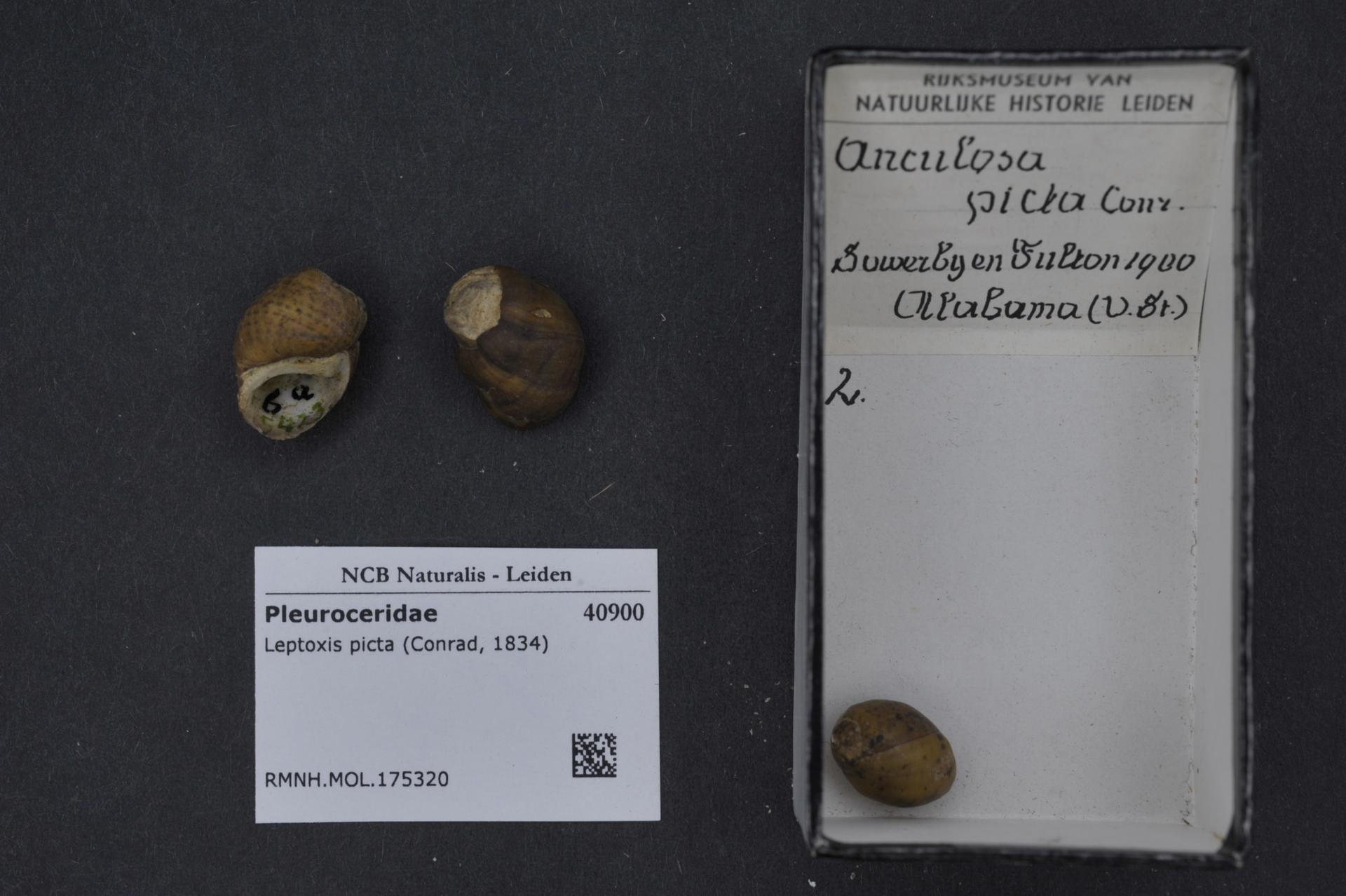

The spotted rocksnail, scientific name Leptoxis picta, is a species of freshwater snail with a gill and an operculum, an aquatic gastropod mollusc in the family Pleuroceridae. This species is endemic to Alabama in the United States.
