= Lottia alveus =

Conservation status
- Extinct (1929) (IUCN 2.3)

Scientific classification
- Kingdom: Animalia
- Phylum: Mollusca
- Class: Gastropoda
- Subclass: Patellogastropoda
- Family: Lottiidae
- Genus: Lottia
- Species: †L. alveus

Binomial name
- †Lottia alveus (Conrad, 1831)

Synonyms
- Patella alveus Conrad, 1831 (original combination); Acmaea scutum parallela Dall, 1921

Species of gastropod

Lottia alveus, the eelgrass limpet or bowl limpet, was a species of sea snail or small limpet, a marine gastropod mollusk in the family Lottiidae, the Lottia limpets, a genus of true limpets. This species lived in the western Atlantic Ocean.

The eelgrass limpet now appears to be totally extinct, but up until the late 1920s, this species was apparently quite common, and was easy to find at low tide in eelgrass beds, in many sheltered localities on the northeastern seaboard of North America.

== Distribution before extinction ==
This limpet was found from Labrador, Canada, as far south as New York.

It may have become extinct as much as 60 years before its extinction was noticed. (Fall, 2005)

== Habitat ==
This small limpet used to live on the blades of Zostera marina, a species of seagrass.

== Cause of extinction ==
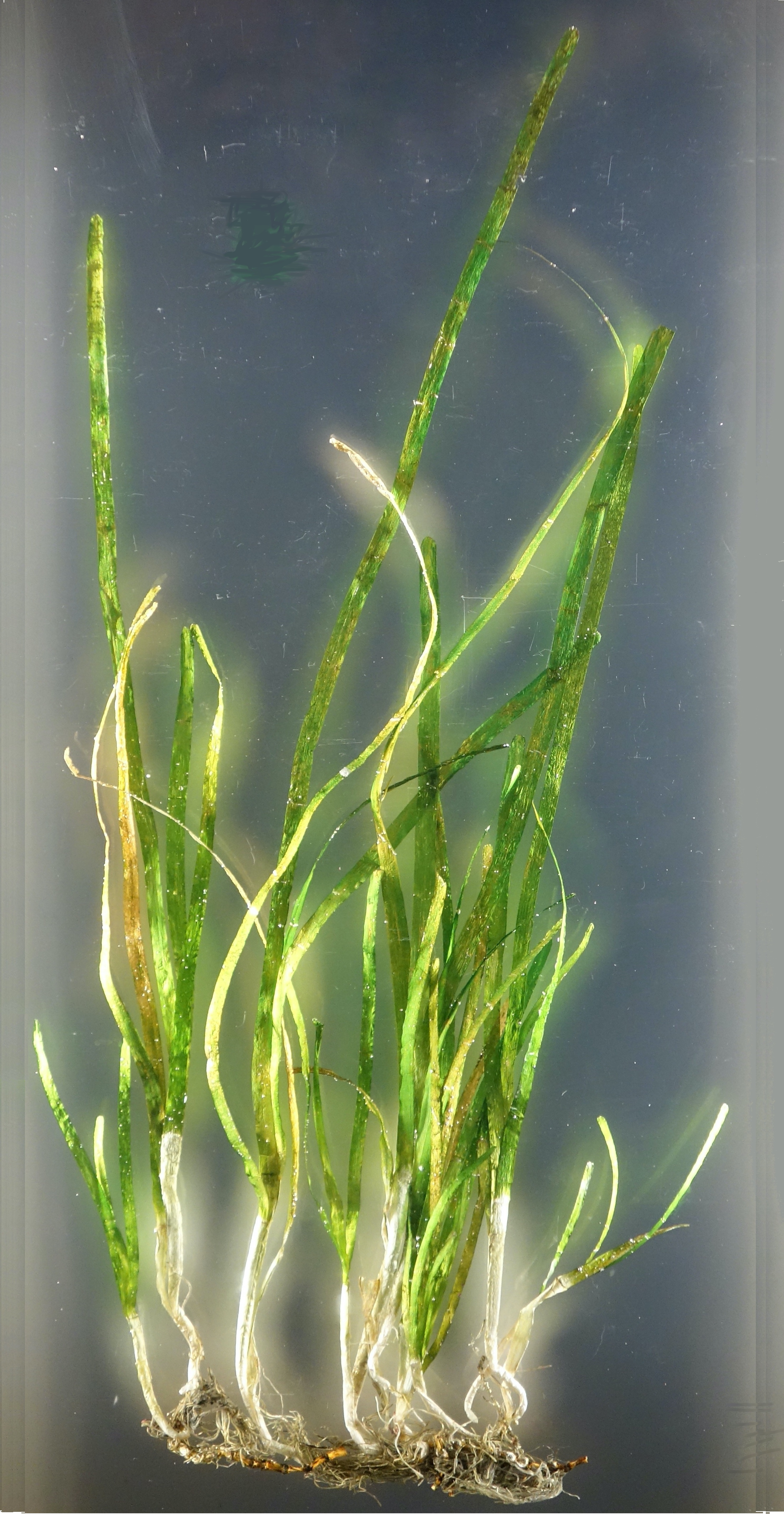
Colonies of the seagrass Zostera marina living in brackish water environments were the sole habitat of Lottia alveus.

The extinction of Lottia alveus does not seem to have been caused directly by human interference. This small limpet disappeared from the fauna because of a sudden catastrophic collapse of the populations of the eelgrass plant, Zostera marina, which was its sole habitat and food source. In the early 1930s, the seagrass beds all along that part of the coastline were decimated by "wasting disease", which was caused by a slime mold of the genus Labyrinthula. Some colonies of Zostera marina lived in brackish water, and these areas served as refugia for the eelgrass since the wasting disease did not spread to brackish water. The eelgrass was thus able to survive the catastrophic impact of the disease. The limpet however was unable to tolerate anything but normal salinity seawater, and therefore it did not live through the crisis.
