= Knob mudalia =

Conservation status
- Vulnerable (IUCN 2.3)

- Presumed Extinct (NatureServe)

Scientific classification
- Kingdom: Animalia
- Phylum: Mollusca
- Class: Gastropoda
- Subclass: Caenogastropoda
- Order: incertae sedis
- Family: Pleuroceridae
- Genus: Leptoxis
- Species: L. minor

Binomial name
- Leptoxis minor Hinkley, 1912

Synonyms
- Anculosa minor Hinkley, 1912

Species of mollusc

The knob mudalia, scientific name Leptoxis minor, is a species of freshwater snail with a gill and an operculum, an aquatic gastropod mollusk in the family Pleuroceridae.

This species is endemic to the United States.
