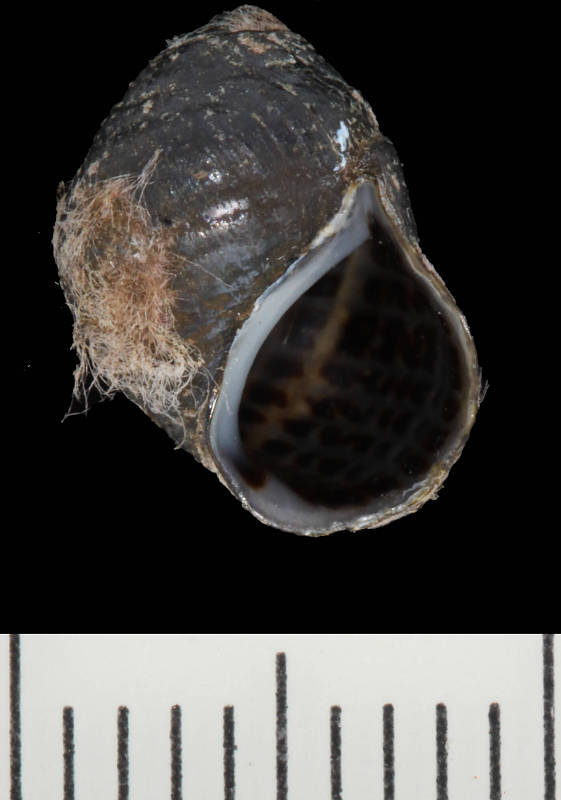

Conservation status
- Extinct (IUCN 2.3)

- Endangered (ESA)

Scientific classification
- Kingdom: Animalia
- Phylum: Mollusca
- Class: Gastropoda
- Subclass: Caenogastropoda
- Order: incertae sedis
- Family: Pleuroceridae
- Genus: Leptoxis
- Species: †L. foremani

Binomial name
- †Leptoxis foremani (I. Lea, 1843)

Synonyms
- Anculosa formani I. Lea, 1843

= Leptoxis foremani =

Species of gastropod

Leptoxis foremani, the interrupted rocksnail, is a species of freshwater snail with a gill and an operculum, an aquatic gastropod mollusk in the family Pleuroceridae.

This species is endemic to parts of the Coosa River and its tributaries. It was formerly believed to be extinct, and remains classified as Extinct on the IUCN Red List. However, in 1997, a U.S. Fish and Wildlife Service biologist discovered one specimen in the Oostanaula River in Georgia. Scientists from the Tennessee Aquarium Research Institute subsequently began collecting Interrupted Rocksnails from the Oostanaula in order to reintroduce them to other rivers where they had formerly lived. In 2004, 3,000 of the snails were reintroduced to the Coosa River in Alabama.
