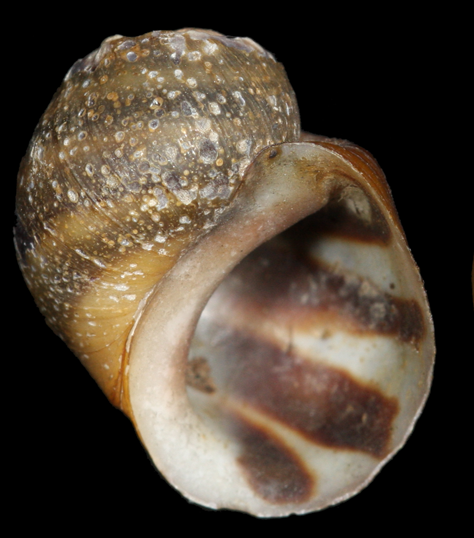
- Lectotype of Leptoxis ampla (MCZ 161803)

Conservation status
- Vulnerable (IUCN 2.3)

- Imperiled (NatureServe)

Scientific classification
- Kingdom: Animalia
- Phylum: Mollusca
- Class: Gastropoda
- Subclass: Caenogastropoda
- Order: incertae sedis
- Family: Pleuroceridae
- Genus: Leptoxis
- Species: L. ampla

Binomial name
- Leptoxis ampla (Anthony, 1855)

Synonyms
- Anculosa ampla Anthony, 1855; Anculosa elegans Anthony, 1860; Anculosa mimica Goodrich, 1922; Anculosa smithi Goodrich, 1922; Anculotus amplus Anthony, 1855

= Leptoxis ampla =

Species of gastropod

Leptoxis ampla, common name the round rocksnail, is a species of freshwater snail with a gill and an operculum, an aquatic gastropod mollusc in the family Pleuroceridae.

This species is endemic to the United States, specifically the state of Alabama. The snail has been listed as threatened on the United States Fish and Wildlife Service list of endangered species since 28 October 1998.

Leptoxis ampla is a vulnerable species according to the IUCN Red list.

== Description ==
The round rocksnail is a pleurocerid snail and its shell grows to about 20 mm (0.8 in) in length. The shell is subglobose, with an ovately rounded aperture. The body whorl is shouldered at the suture, and may be ornamented with folds or plicae. Color may be yellow, dark brown, or olive green, usually with four entire or broken bands.

Lydeard et al. (1997) found slight differences in DNA sequencing between the painted rocksnail and the round rocksnail, and considered them to be sister species. Following analysis by allozyme electrophoresis on these same species, Dillon speculated that the two species represented isolated populations belonging to a single species. The two species are geographically separated, with the painted rocksnail inhabiting Coosa River tributaries, and the round rocksnail inhabiting the Cahaba River drainage. Both species are currently recognized by the malacological community.

== Distribution ==
The round rocksnail was historically found in the Cahaba River and the Little Cahaba River, Bibb County, Alabama; and the Coosa River, Elmore County, Alabama, and tributaries—Big Canoe and Kelly's creeks, St. Clair County, Alabama; Ohatchee Creek, Calhoun County, Alabama; Yellowleaf Creek, Shelby County, Alabama; and Waxahatchee Creek, Shelby/Chilton counties, Alabama. The type locality is Alabama.

The round rocksnail is currently known from a shoal series in the Cahaba River, Bibb and Shelby counties, Alabama, and from the lower reach of the Little Cahaba River, and the lower reaches of Shade and Six-mile creeks in Bibb County, Alabama.

== Reasons for the decline ==
The round rocksnail has disappeared from more than 90 percent of its historic range. The curtailment of habitat and range for this (and a few other snail species) in the Mobile Basin's larger rivers (Cahaba River, Coosa River and its tributaries for round rocksnail) is primarily due to extensive construction of dams, and the subsequent inundation of the snail's shoal habitats by the impounded waters. This snail has disappeared from all portions of its historic habitats that have been impounded by dams.

Dams change such areas by eliminating or reducing currents, and thus allowing sediments to accumulate on inundated channel habitats. Impounded waters also experience changes in water chemistry, which could affect survival or reproduction of riverine snails. For example, many reservoirs in the Basin currently experience eutrophic (enrichment of a water body with nutrients) conditions, and chronically low dissolved oxygen levels. Such physical and chemical changes can affect feeding, respiration, and reproduction of these riffle and shoal snail species.

== Ecology ==
=== Habitat ===
Rocksnails are gill breathing snails found attached to cobble, gravel, or other hard substrates in the strong currents of riffles and shoals.

=== Life cycle ===
Adult rocksnails move very little, and females probably glue their eggs to stones in the same habitat. Longevity in the round rocksnail is unknown; however, it was reported as having a short life span (less than 2 years) in a Tennessee River rocksnail.
