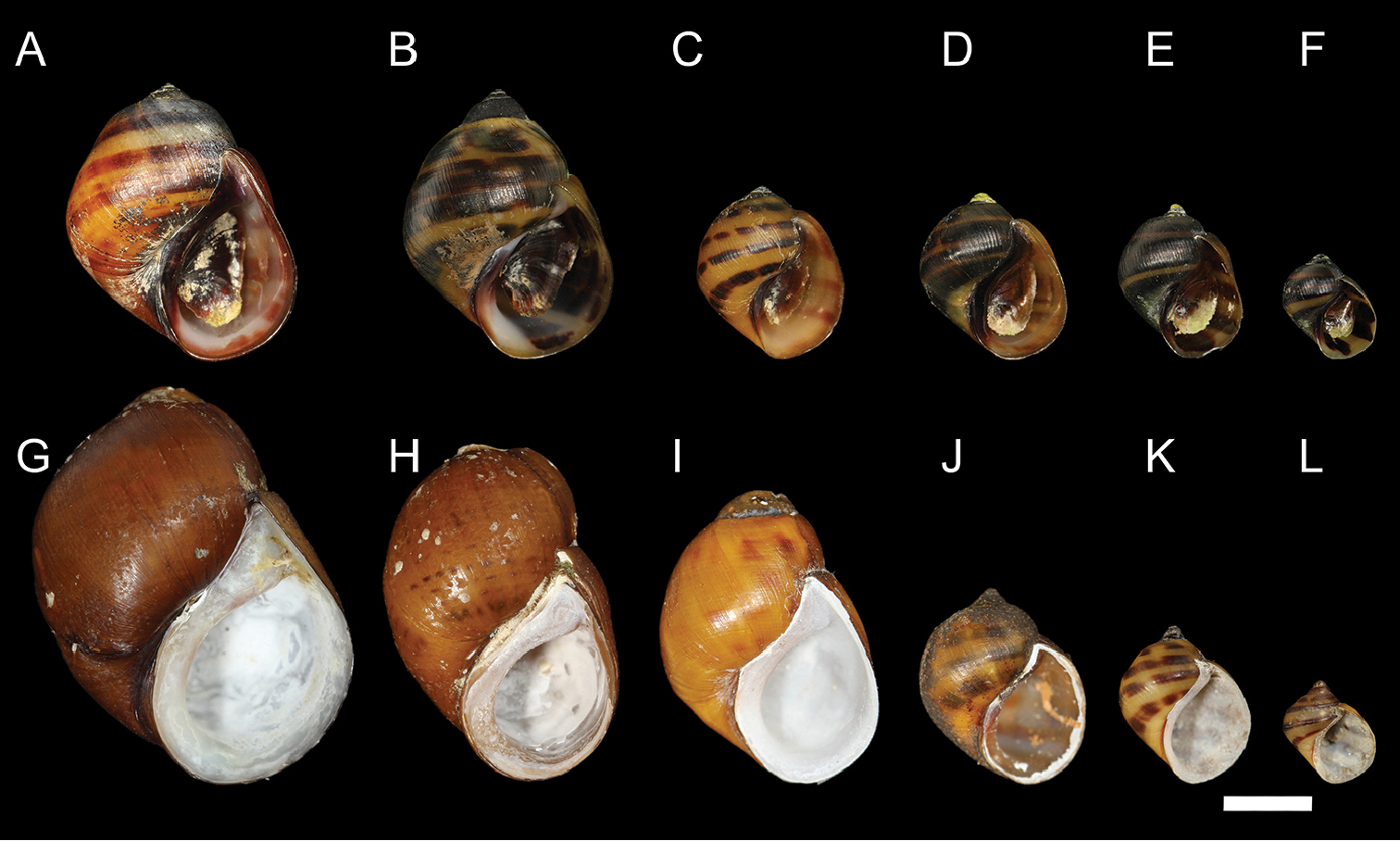
- Shells of Leptoxis coosaensis and Leptoxis picta

Scientific classification
- Domain: Eukaryota
- Kingdom: Animalia
- Phylum: Mollusca
- Class: Gastropoda
- Subclass: Caenogastropoda
- Superfamily: Cerithioidea
- Family: Pleuroceridae
- Genus: Leptoxis; Rafinesque, 1819

= Leptoxis =

Genus of gastropods

Leptoxis is a genus of freshwater snails with a gill and an operculum, aquatic gastropod molluscs in the family Pleuroceridae.

Species within this genus inhabit rocky fast-flowing parts of unpolluted and unimpounded mid-sized rivers in the American mid South and the southern Midwest. Species in the subgenus Mudalia inhabit rivers and creeks in the Atlantic drainage.

== Species ==
Species within the genus Leptoxis include: Those that are extinct are marked with a dagger †.

- Leptoxis ampla (Anthony, 1855) (round rocksnail)
- Leptoxis arkansensis (Hinkley, 1915)
- Leptoxis carinata (Bruguière, 1792) (crested mudalia)
- †Leptoxis clipeata (Smith, 1922) (Agate rocksnail)
- Leptoxis coosaensis (I. Lea, 1861) (Painted rocksnail)
- Leptoxis compacta (J. G. Anthony, 1854) (Oblong rocksnail)
- Leptoxis dilatata (Conrad, 1835)
- Leptoxis foremanii (I. Lea, 1843) (Interrupted rocksnail)
- †Leptoxis formosa (I. Lea, 1860) (Maiden rocksnail)
- †Leptoxis ligata (Anthony, 1860) (Rotund rocksnail)
- †Leptoxis lirata (Smith, 1922) (Lyrate rocksnail)
- Leptoxis mimica (Goodrich, 1922)
- Leptoxis minor (Hinkley, 1912) (Knob mudalia)
- Leptoxis nickliniana (I. Lea, 1841)
- †Leptoxis occultata (Smith, 1922) (Bigmouth rocksnail)
- Leptoxis picta (Conrad, 1834) (Spotted rocksnail)
- Leptoxis plicata (Hinkley, 1915) (Plicate rocksnail)
- Leptoxis praerosa (Say, 1821) (Mainstream river snail)
- †Leptoxis showalterii (I. Lea, 1860) (Coosa rocksnail)
- Leptoxis subglobosa (Say, 1825)
- †Leptoxis torrefacta (Goodrich, 1922) (Squat rocksnail)
- Leptoxis trilineata (Say, 1829)
- Leptoxis umbilicata (Wetherby, 1876)
- Leptoxis virgata (I. Lea, 1841) (Smooth rocksnail)
- Leptoxis vittata (I. Lea, 1860) (Striped rocksnail)

Synonyms

- Leptoxis anthonyix is a synonym for Athearnia anthonyi (Anthony's river snail)
- †Leptoxis crassa is a synonym for †Athearnia crassa (boulder snail)
- †Leptoxis pisum is a synonym for †Athearnia crassa
- Leptoxis rapaeformis is a synonym of Leptoxis dilatata
- Leptoxis melanoides is a synonym of Elimia melanoides (Black mudalia)
