= Smooth rocksnail =

Conservation status
- Vulnerable (IUCN 2.3)

- Imperiled (NatureServe)

Scientific classification
- Kingdom: Animalia
- Phylum: Mollusca
- Class: Gastropoda
- Subclass: Caenogastropoda
- Order: incertae sedis
- Family: Pleuroceridae
- Genus: Leptoxis
- Species: L. virgata

Binomial name
- Leptoxis virgata (Lea, 1841)

Synonyms
- Melania virgata Lea, 1841

Species of gastropod

The smooth rocksnail, scientific name Leptoxis virgata, is a species of freshwater snail with a gill and an operculum, an aquatic gastropod mollusk in the family Pleuroceridae. This species is endemic to the United States.
