= Leptoxis torrefacta =

Conservation status
- Extinct (IUCN 2.3)

- Presumed Extinct (NatureServe)

Scientific classification
- Kingdom: Animalia
- Phylum: Mollusca
- Class: Gastropoda
- Subclass: Caenogastropoda
- Order: incertae sedis
- Family: Pleuroceridae
- Genus: Leptoxis
- Species: †L. torrefacta

Binomial name
- †Leptoxis torrefacta (Goodrich, 1922)

Synonyms
- Anculosa torrefacta C. Goodrich, 1922

Species of gastropod

Leptoxis torrefacta, or the squat rocksnail, is a species of freshwater snail in the family Pleuroceridae. This species was endemic to Alabama, the United States, with records from the Coosa River. It is now extinct, presumably as a consequence of the impoundment of the Coosa River mainstem.

The shell measures 15–20 mm (0.59–0.79 in) in length and 11–13 mm (0.43–0.51 in) in width.
