= Bigmouth rocksnail =

Conservation status
- Extinct (IUCN 3.1)

- Presumed Extinct (NatureServe)

Scientific classification
- Kingdom: Animalia
- Phylum: Mollusca
- Class: Gastropoda
- Subclass: Caenogastropoda
- Order: incertae sedis
- Family: Pleuroceridae
- Genus: Leptoxis
- Species: †L. occultata

Binomial name
- †Leptoxis occultata (H. H. Smith, 1922)

Synonyms
- Anculopsa occulata

Species of gastropod

The bigmouth rocksnail, scientific name †Leptoxis occultata, was a species of freshwater snail with a gill and an operculum, an aquatic gastropod mollusc in the family Pleuroceridae. This species was endemic to Alabama in the United States. It is now extinct.
