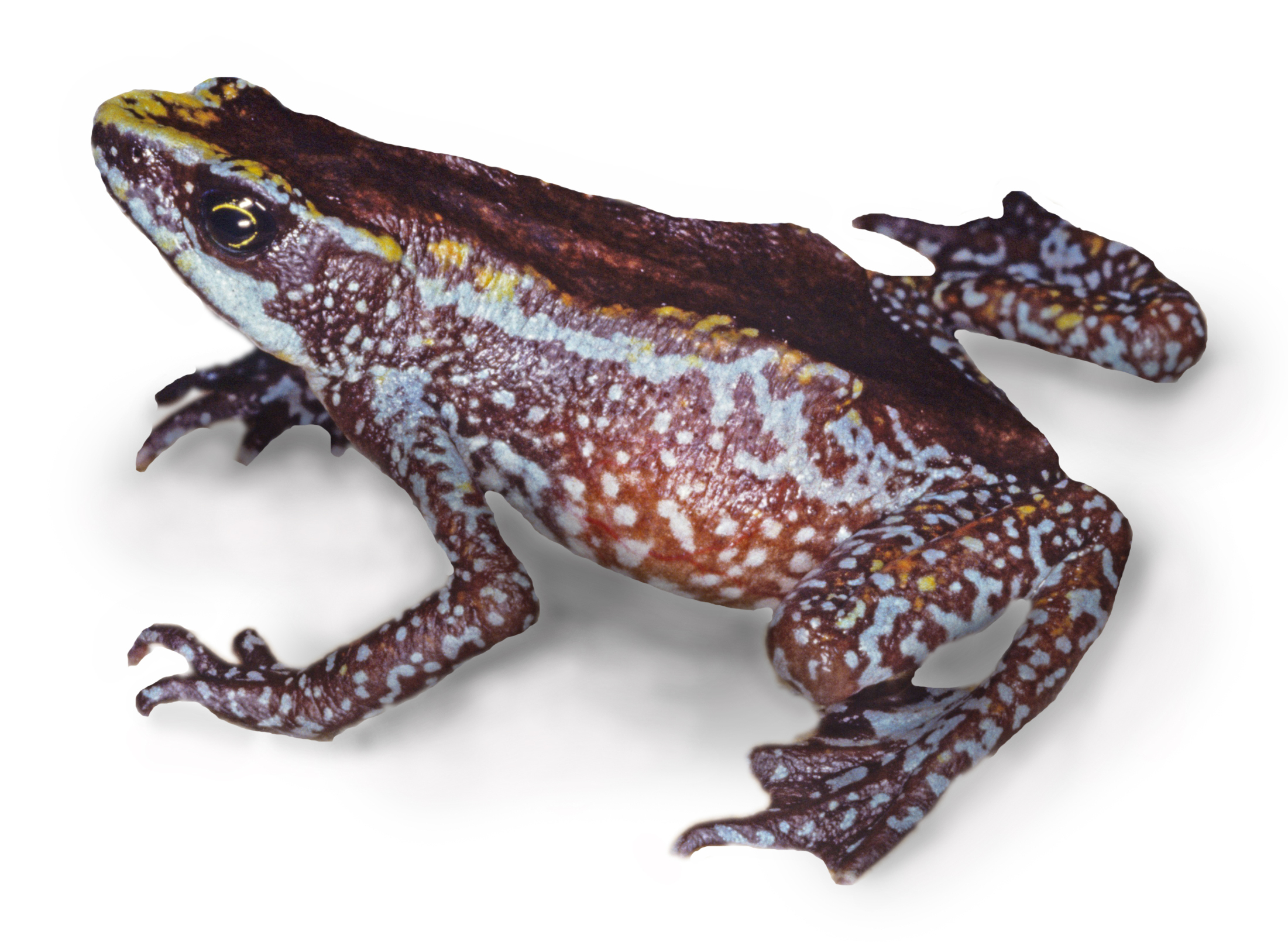

Conservation status
- Extinct (c. 1996) (IUCN 3.1)

Scientific classification
- Kingdom: Animalia
- Phylum: Chordata
- Class: Amphibia
- Order: Anura
- Family: Bufonidae
- Genus: Atelopus
- Species: †A. chiriquiensis

Binomial name
- †Atelopus chiriquiensis Shreve, 1926

= Atelopus chiriquiensis =

Extinct species of amphibian

Atelopus chiriquiensis, the Chiriqui harlequin frog or Lewis' stubfoot toad, is an extinct species of toad in the family Bufonidae that was found in the Cordillera de Talamanca in Costa Rica and western Panama (Province and Bocas del Toro Provinces). Its natural habitats were stream margins in lower montane wet forests and rainforests. Its elevational range was 1,400–2,500 m (4,600–8,200 ft) above sea level.

== Description ==
Atelopus chiriquiensis was a moderately sized toad: males measure 28–34 mm (1.1–1.3 in) in snout–vent length and females 36–49 mm (1.4–1.9 in). Colouring was highly variable and usually different between males and females. They had weakly developed and relatively inconspicuous poison glands scattered over the head and dorsum; nevertheless, they produced tetrodotoxin and aminoacid analog chiriquitoxin, a potent neurotoxin.

=== Anatomy ===
The toad lacked a middle ear and used other means to transfer sound to the inner ear. The structure responsible for this was the body wall overlying the lung.

== Behaviour ==
The frogs were diurnal. Breeding took place between May and July, early in the wet season, and days to months could pass after the start of amplexus before egg-laying began. During breeding season, males would attract females by using buzzes; one of the three vocalizations the frog was known to make, the other two being chirps and whistles.

Buzzes also served as advertisement calls, as males were territorial; the buzzing served to warn other males to stay away. If two buzzing males were in close proximity (a couple meters) they would often turn to face each other, and then begin to move forward while alternating buzzes. This usually resulted in one of the males ceasing to buzz and retreating, but if neither of them did so combat would ensue.

=== Combat ===
Fights consisted of wrestling bouts, in which combatants would attempt to climb or jump onto the back of the other combatant. Once a frog had succeeded in getting on top of their opponent, they would grab onto them; this was occasionally accompanied by whistles. If the mounted frog ceased to resist it would be released after 5 seconds to half a minute, after which it would remain motionless for up to another half a minute.

If the mounted frog continued struggling, the mounting frog would begin to jerk its body around to force their opponent into submission. This would often end with the frog on top initiating a flip, done by jerking its body upwards, which, if performed successfully, would cause both frogs to end up on their backs, with the mounted frog ending up on top with its belly to the air, held from behind by the mounting frog. As before, if the frog being held ceased to resist it would be released, after which both frogs would right themselves.

After the loser of a bout was released, the winner would usually whistle, buzz or do both. If the loser responded by also buzzing, another bout would begin. Fights were observed having four bouts and lasting up to half an hour.

== Conservation status ==
The species was once locally abundant, living near watercourses in Costa Rica and Panama, but is now thought to be extinct. The species has not been seen in Costa Rica since 1996, and there are no recorded sightings of it from Panama as since the late 1990s. The decline was probably linked to chytridiomycosis, habitat loss and introduced trout. After their 2019 assessment of the frog, the IUCN considers Atelopus chiriquiensis extinct.
