= Rotund rocksnail =

Conservation status
- Extinct (IUCN 2.3)

- Presumed Extinct (NatureServe)

Scientific classification
- Kingdom: Animalia
- Phylum: Mollusca
- Class: Gastropoda
- Subclass: Caenogastropoda
- Order: incertae sedis
- Family: Pleuroceridae
- Genus: Leptoxis
- Species: †L. ligata

Binomial name
- †Leptoxis ligata (Anthony, 1860)

Synonyms
- Anculosa ligata Anthony, 1860

Species of gastropod

The rotund rocksnail, scientific name †Leptoxis ligata, was a species of gastropod in the family Pleuroceridae.

This species was endemic to the United States. It is now extinct.
