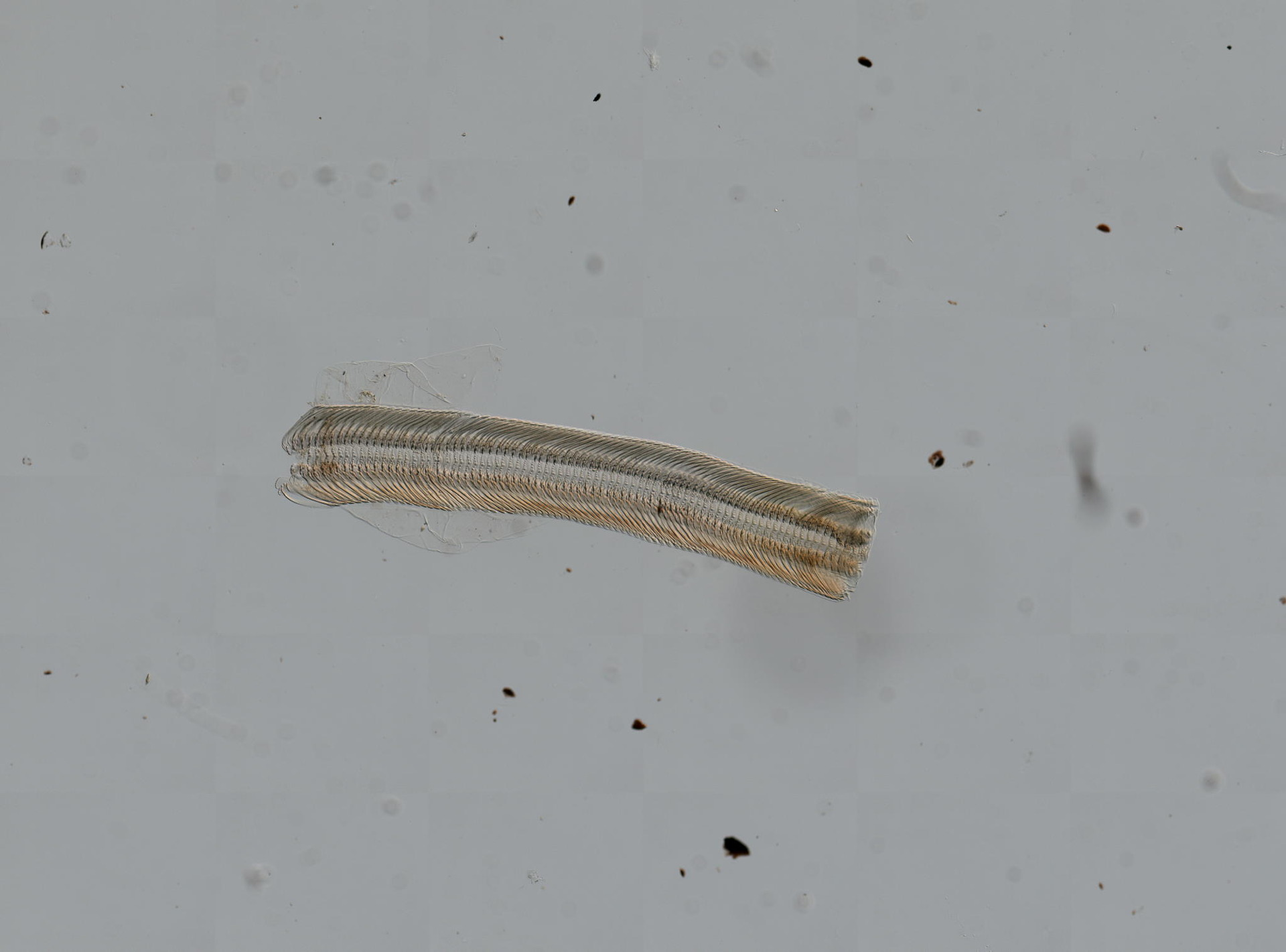

Conservation status
- Extinct (IUCN 2.3)

- Presumed Extinct (NatureServe)

Scientific classification
- Kingdom: Animalia
- Phylum: Mollusca
- Class: Gastropoda
- Subclass: Caenogastropoda
- Order: incertae sedis
- Family: Pleuroceridae
- Genus: Leptoxis
- Species: †L. formosa

Binomial name
- †Leptoxis formosa (Lea, 1860)

Synonyms
- Anculosa formosa Lea, 1860

= Maiden rocksnail =

Species of gastropod

The maiden rocksnail, scientific name †Leptoxis formosa, was a species of freshwater snail with a gill and an operculum, an aquatic gastropod mollusk in the family Pleuroceridae.

This species was endemic to the United States. It is now extinct.
