= Coosa rocksnail =

Conservation status
- Extinct (IUCN 2.3)

- Presumed Extinct (NatureServe)

Scientific classification
- Kingdom: Animalia
- Phylum: Mollusca
- Class: Gastropoda
- Subclass: Caenogastropoda
- Order: incertae sedis
- Family: Pleuroceridae
- Genus: Leptoxis
- Species: †L. showalterii

Binomial name
- †Leptoxis showalterii (Lea, 1860)

Synonyms
- Anculosa showalterii Lea, 1860; Anculotus sulcosus Reeve, 1861

Species of gastropod

The Coosa rocksnail, scientific name †Leptoxis showalterii, also known as the "ribbed rocksnail", was a species of freshwater snails with an operculum, aquatic gastropod mollusks in the family Pleuroceridae.

This species was endemic to the United States. It is now extinct.
