= Leptoxis clipeata =

Conservation status
- Extinct (IUCN 2.3)

- Presumed Extinct (NatureServe)

Scientific classification
- Kingdom: Animalia
- Phylum: Mollusca
- Class: Gastropoda
- Subclass: Caenogastropoda
- Order: incertae sedis
- Family: Pleuroceridae
- Genus: Leptoxis
- Species: †L. clipeata

Binomial name
- †Leptoxis clipeata (H. H. Smith, 1922)

Extinct species of gastropod

Leptoxis clipeata, the agate rocksnail, was a freshwater snail in the family Pleuroceridae. Like all Leptoxis, the species required free-flowing unpolluted water. It was endemic to parts of the Coosa River in Alabama, now impounded.
