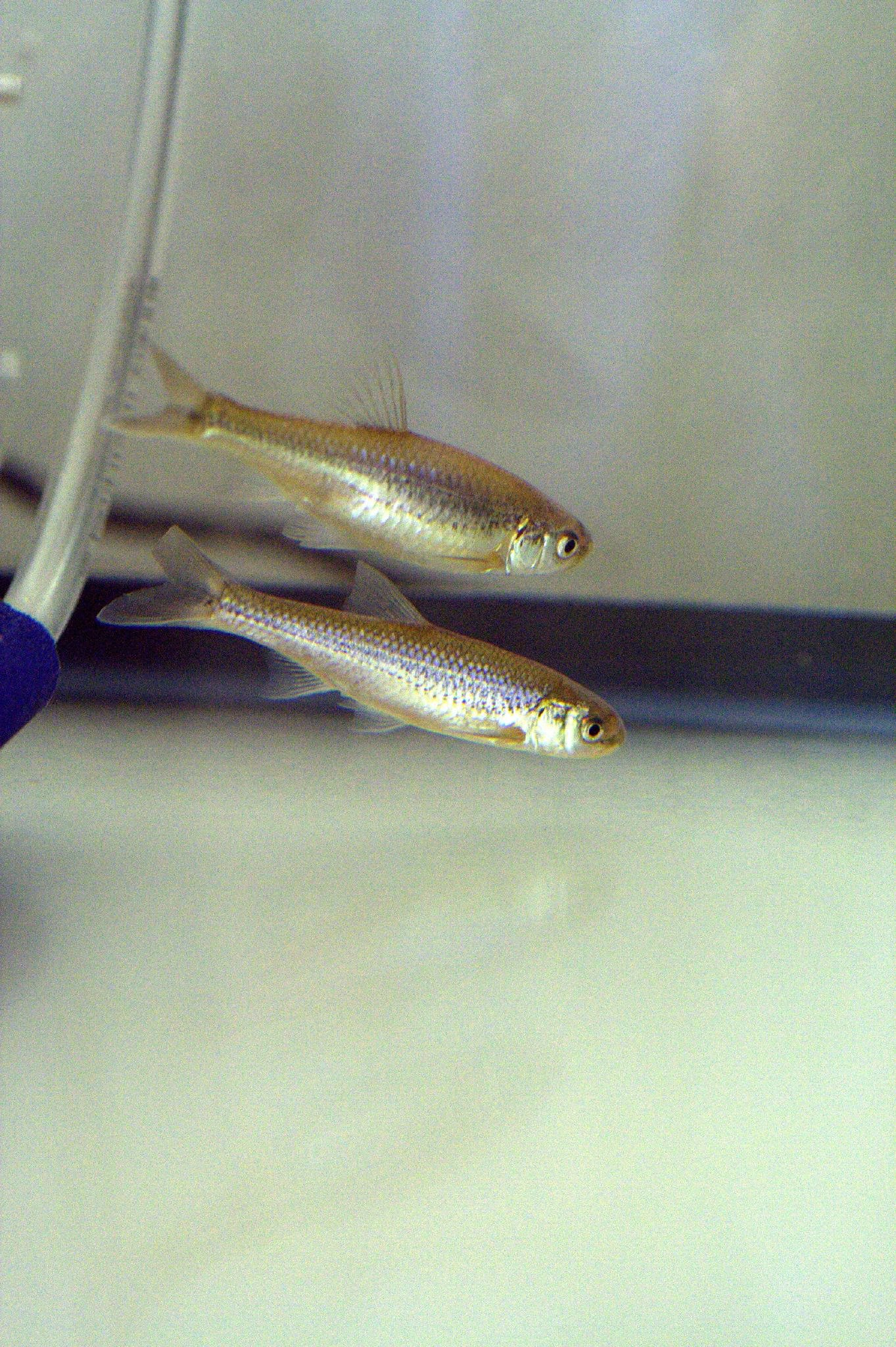
- Pecosensis subspecies, male and female

Conservation status
- Endangered (IUCN 3.1)

Scientific classification
- Kingdom: Animalia
- Phylum: Chordata
- Class: Actinopterygii
- Order: Cypriniformes
- Family: Leuciscidae
- Subfamily: Pogonichthyinae
- Genus: Alburnops
- Species: A. simus

Binomial name
- Alburnops simus (Cope, 1875)

Synonyms
- Alburnellus simus Cope, 1875; Notropis simus (Cope, 1875); Notropis simus pecosensis C. R. Gilbert & Chernoff, 1982

= Bluntnose shiner =

Species of fish

The bluntnose shiner (Alburnops simus) is a species of freshwater ray-finned fish in the family Leuciscidae, the shiners, daces and minnows. It was found in Mexico and the United States, but is now only known from the United States.
