= Pearly mussel =

Pearly mussel may refer to:

- Acorn pearly mussel
- Alabama lamp pearly mussel
- Appalachian monkey-face pearly mussel
- Arc-form pearly mussel
- Arcuate pearly mussel
- Clubshell pearly mussel
- Cracking pearly mussel
- Cumberland bean pearly mussel
- Cumberland monkeyface pearly mussel
- Dromedary pearly mussel
- Edible pearly mussel
- Fat pocketbook pearly mussel
- Fine-rayed pearly mussel
- Fine-rayed pigtoe pearly mussel
- Golf stick pearly mussel
- Higgins' eye pearly mussel
- Lewis pearly mussel
- Little winged pearly mussel
- Nearby pearly mussel
- Neosho pearly mussel
- Pale lilliput pearly mussel
- Recovery pearly mussel
- Rough maple leaf pearly mussel
- Rough pigtoe pearly mussel
- Sampson's pearly mussel
- Slab-sided pearly mussel
- Spectacle case pearly mussel
- Steward's pearly mussel
- Stone's pearly mussel
- Tan-blossom pearly mussel
- Turgid-blossom pearly mussel
- Wheeler's pearly mussel
- White warty-back pearly mussel
