= Epioblasma othcaloogensis =

Conservation status
- Critically Endangered (IUCN 3.1)

- Extinct (ESA)

Scientific classification
- Kingdom: Animalia
- Phylum: Mollusca
- Class: Bivalvia
- Order: Unionida
- Family: Unionidae
- Genus: Epioblasma
- Species: E. othcaloogensis

Binomial name
- Epioblasma othcaloogensis (I. Lea, 1857)

Synonyms
- Dysnomia othcaloogensis I. Lea, 1857

Species of bivalve

Epioblasma othcaloogensis, the southern acornshell or southern acorn riffle shell, was a species of freshwater mussel in the family Unionidae. It was only known from the Coosa and Cahaba Rivers of the southeastern United States.

This species has been heavily impacted by dam construction, dredging, and water pollution. The last living individual was seen in 1974, and subsequent surveys have failed to locate any living populations. Some scientists believe it is now extinct. The US Fish and Wildlife Service delisted the species from the Endangered Species Act effective November 16, 2023, citing extinction.

It appears to be closely related to the critically endangered Epioblasma penita.
