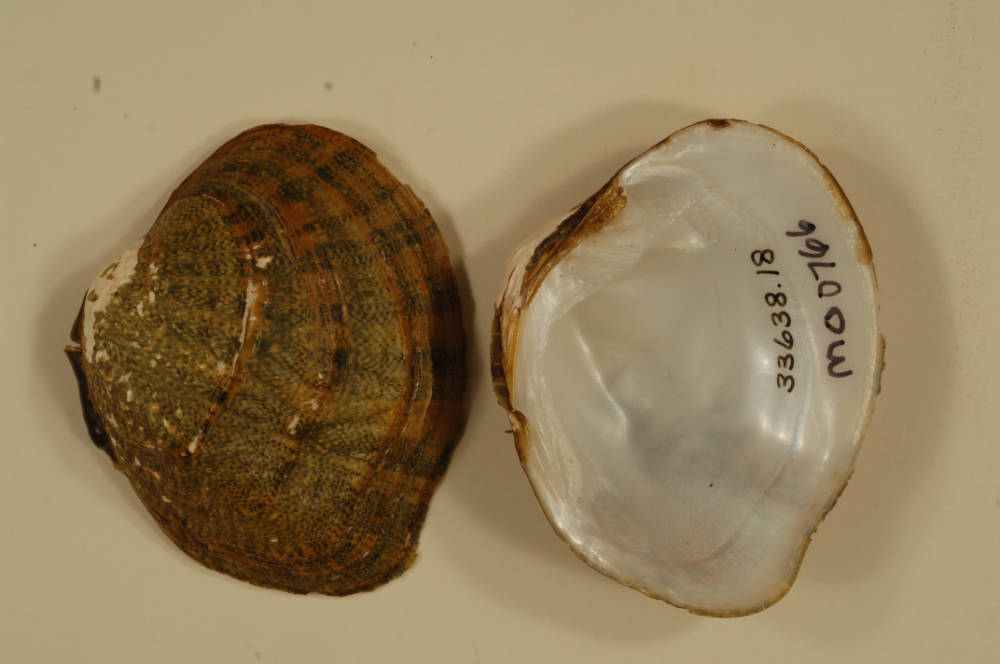

Conservation status
- Data Deficient (IUCN 3.1)
- CITES Appendix II (CITES)

Scientific classification
- Kingdom: Animalia
- Phylum: Mollusca
- Class: Bivalvia
- Order: Unionida
- Family: Unionidae
- Genus: Cyprogenia
- Species: C. aberti

Binomial name
- Cyprogenia aberti (Conrad, 1850)

= Cyprogenia aberti =

Species of bivalve

Cyprogenia aberti, the western fanshell, edible naiad, edible pearly mussel, or western fanshell mussel, is a species of freshwater mussel, an aquatic bivalve mollusk in the family Unionidae, the river mussels.

This species is endemic to the United States, and is found in the Lower Mississippi-St. Francis, Neosho-Verdigris and Upper White River basins within Arkansas, Kansas, Missouri and Oklahoma.

It has a thick, round to triangular shell that is up to 3 inches (76 mm) long. The fish hosts for the larval stage include logperch (Percina caprodes). Slenderhead darter (Percina phoxocephala), fantail darter (Etheostoma flabellare), rainbow darter (Etheostoma caeruleum), and orangebelly darter (Etheostoma radiosum) are also good hosts provided they are from the same stream as the mussel (sympatric populations).

In 2023 it was listed as a Threatened species under the Endangered Species Act. Water quality degradation, altered stream flow, landscape changes, and habitat fragmentation, all of which are exacerbated by the effects of climate change, are the main threats to this species.

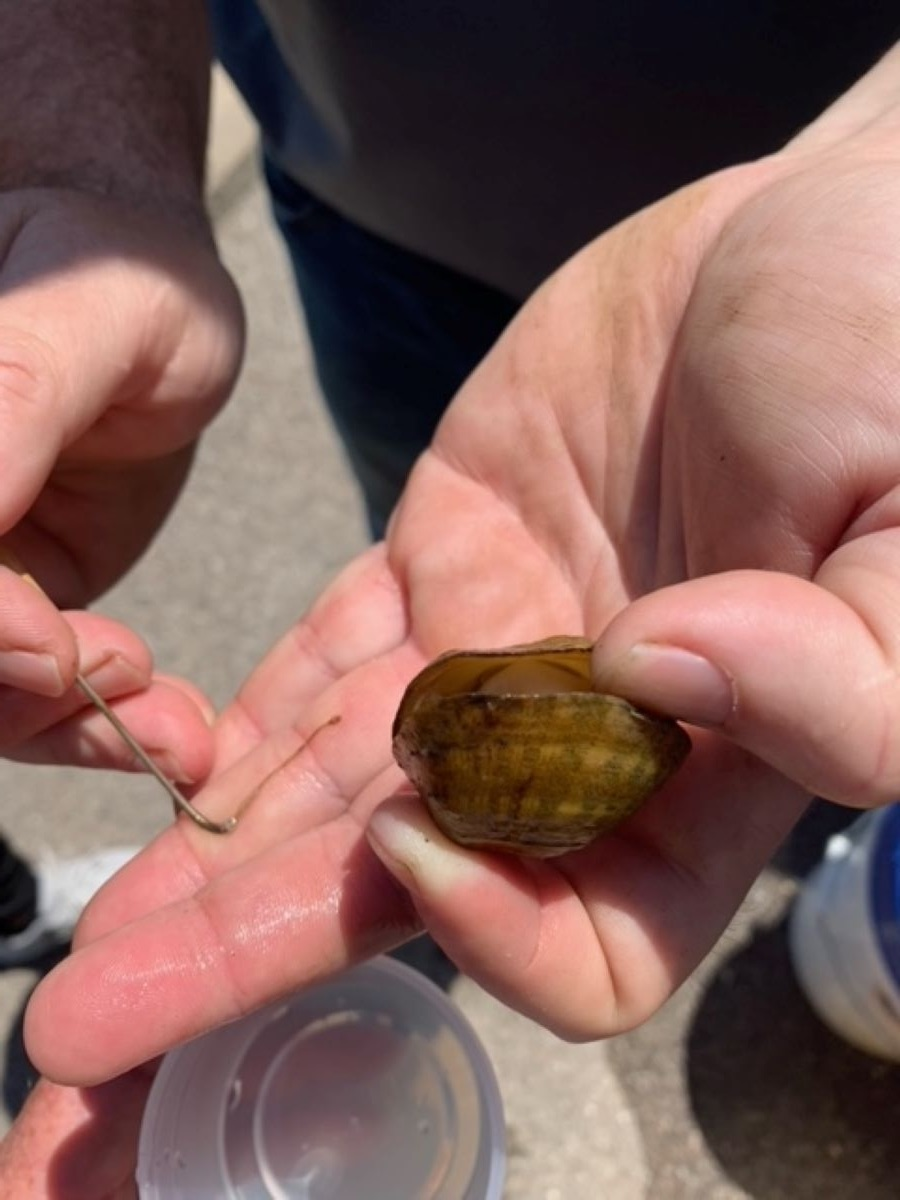
Western Fanshell brooder with extracted conglutinate. This conglutinate houses the mussel's glochidia
