= Upland combshell =

Conservation status
- Critically Endangered (IUCN 2.3)

- Extinct (ESA)

Scientific classification
- Kingdom: Animalia
- Phylum: Mollusca
- Class: Bivalvia
- Order: Unionida
- Family: Unionidae
- Genus: Epioblasma
- Species: E. metastriata

Binomial name
- Epioblasma metastriata (Conrad, 1838)

Synonyms
- Dysnomia metastriata (Conrad, 1838); Margaron (Unio) compactus (I. Lea, 1859); Truncilla compacta (I. Lea, 1859); Truncilla metastriata (Conrad, 1838); Unio compactus I. Lea, 1859; Unio metastriatus Conrad, 1838

Species of bivalve

The upland combshell (Epioblasma metastriata) was a species of freshwater mussel in the family Unionidae. It was endemic to the upper Mobile River Basin in the southeastern United States.

This species was found only in the shoals of rivers and large streams. This habitat has been massively impacted by dam construction and dredging. Due to habitat loss and pollution, this species is considered extinct. The last live individual was seen in 1988, in the Conasauga River. Surveys conducted after that time have failed to find any live individuals in any of their previously known locations, and in 2021 the United States Fish and Wildlife Service proposed officially labeling them as extinct. The species was officially declared extinct and delisted from the Endangered Species Act on November 16, 2023.

There remains the possibility that this species could still exist in sections of the Upper Coosa River Basin that, as of 2008, remain poorly surveyed.
