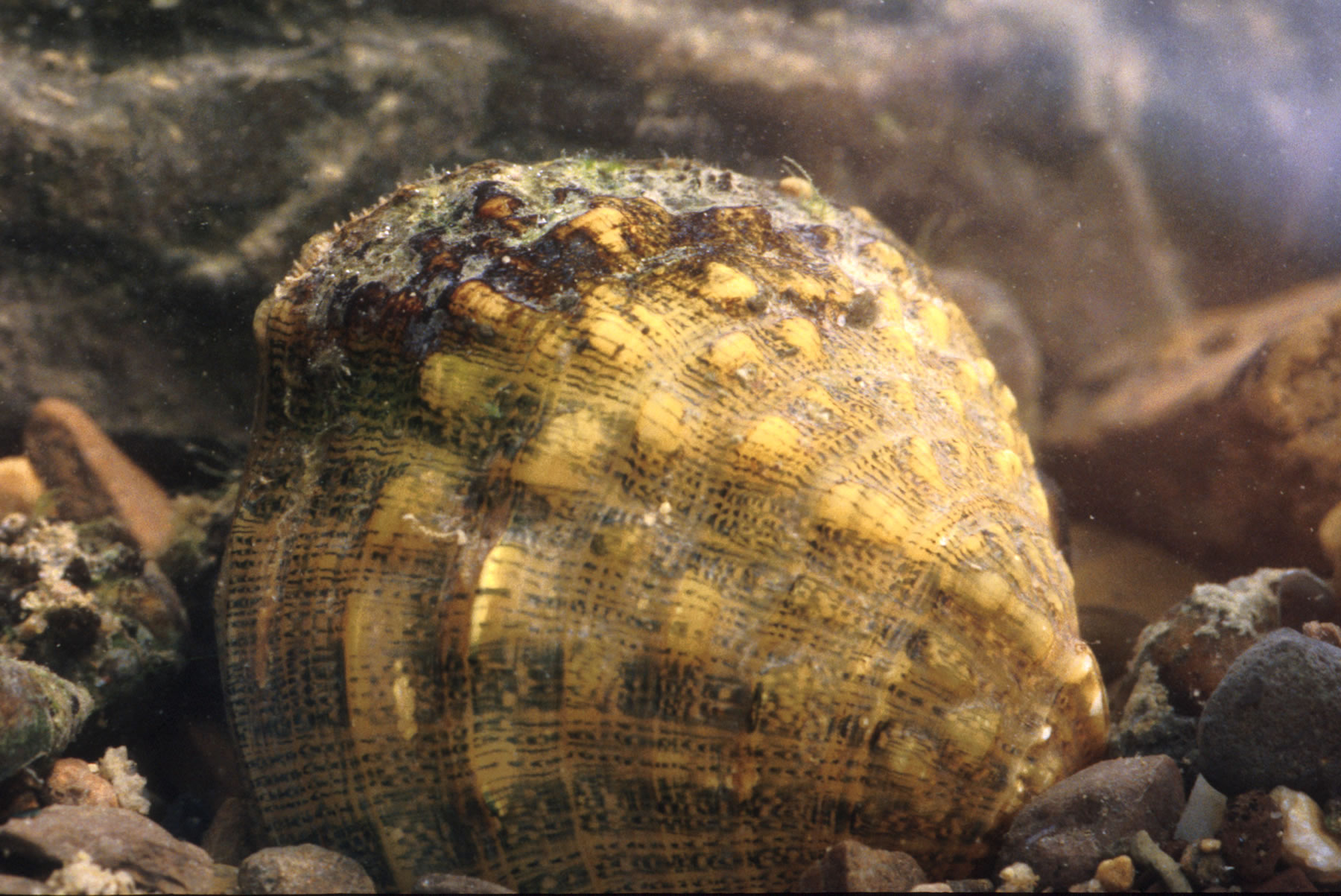

Conservation status
- Critically Endangered (IUCN 2.3)

- Endangered (ESA)

Scientific classification
- Kingdom: Animalia
- Phylum: Mollusca
- Class: Bivalvia
- Order: Unionida
- Family: Unionidae
- Genus: Cyprogenia
- Species: C. stegaria

Binomial name
- Cyprogenia stegaria (Rafinesque, 1820)

Synonyms
- List: Cyprogenia irrorata (Lea, 1828); Cyprogenia irrorata irrorata (Lea, 1828); Cyprogenia irrorata pusilla Simpson, 1900; Obovaria stegaria Rafinesque, 1820; Unio irroratus Lea, 1828; Obovaria stegaria tuberculata Rafinesque, 1820; Obovaria stegaria fasciolata Rafinesque, 1820; Unio verrucosus albus Hildreth, 1828

= Fanshell =

Species of bivalve

The fanshell (Cyprogenia stegaria) is a species of aquatic bivalve mollusk in the family Unionidae. This clam is native to the United States, where breeding populations remain in only three rivers. It is a federally listed endangered species of the United States.

This clam is known to be reproducing in the Clinch River in Tennessee and Virginia, and the Green and Licking Rivers in Kentucky. There may be a small reproducing population in the Tennessee River. There also may be some small populations remaining in several states, but these are not reproducing.

This species is threatened by the loss and degradation of its habitat.

== Reproduction ==
All Unionidae are known to use the gills, fins, or skin of a host fish for nutrients during the larval glochidia stage. Cyprogenia stegaria release into the water a conglutinate mimicking an Oligochaeta worm which contains the mussel's young. When a fish bites into the conglutinate lure, the young glochida are released and latch onto the fish's gills for nutrients.
