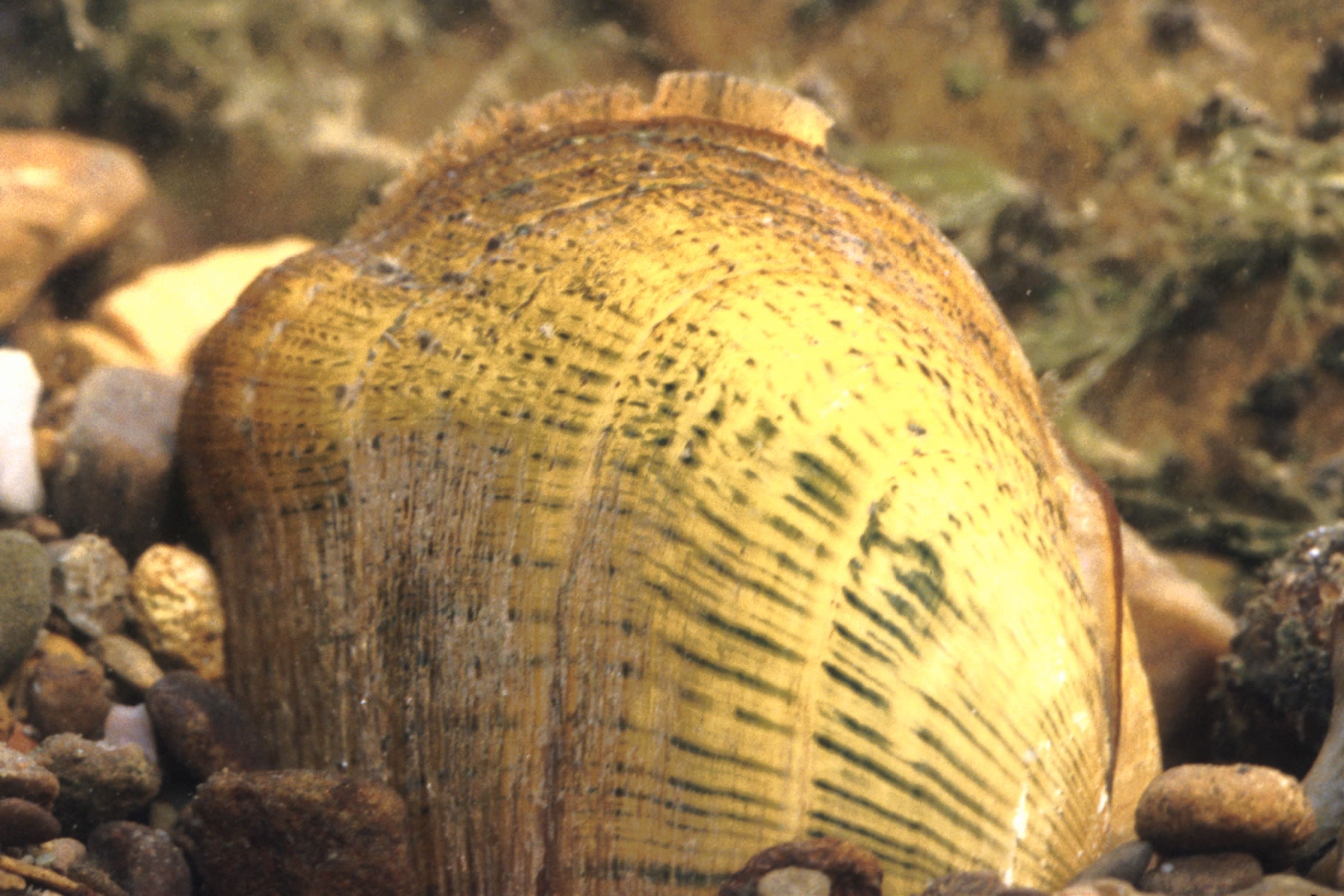
- Epioblasma brevidens

Scientific classification
- Kingdom: Animalia
- Phylum: Mollusca
- Class: Bivalvia
- Order: Unionida
- Family: Unionidae
- Tribe: Lampsilini
- Genus: Epioblasma; Rafinesque, 1831

Synonyms
- Dysnomia Agassiz, 1852

= Epioblasma =

Genus of bivalves

Epioblasma is a North American genus of freshwater mussels, aquatic bivalve mollusks in the family Unionidae, the river mussels. Most of the species in this genus have been lost in modern times, and the entire genus is threatened with the possibility of extinction.

== Reproduction ==
All Unionidae are known to make use of the gills, fins, or skin of a host fish for nutrients during the larval glochidia stage. It was discovered in 2004 that female Epioblasma in the subgenus Torulosa transfer their parasitic larvae to the host fish by snapping onto the head of the fish and pumping the larvae into the host fish's gills. While using bait to lure host fish towards the larvae is common in the family Unionidae, this was the first time that "fish snapping" behavior had been observed. Examination of other species within the genus Epioblasma may further reveal unusual reproductive mechanisms.

== Taxonomy of the genus Epioblasma ==
Note: Taxa with a "†" symbol are extinct due to human activity

- Subgenus †Epioblasma
  - †Epioblasma flexuosa - Leafshell
  - †Epioblasma lewisii - Forkshell
  - †Epioblasma stewardsonii - Cumberland leafshell
- Subgenus Pilea
  - †Epioblasma haysiana - Acornshell
  - Epioblasma obliquata
    - Epioblasma obliquata obliquata - Purple catspaw
    - Epioblasma obliquata perobliqua - White catspaw
  - †Epioblasma personata - Round combshell
- Subgenus Plagiola
  - †Epioblasma arcaeformis - Sugarspoon
  - Epioblasma brevidens - Cumberlandian combshell
  - †Epioblasma lenior - Narrow catspaw
  - Epioblasma metastriata - Upland combshell
  - Epioblasma othcaloogensis - Southern acornshell
  - Epioblasma penita - Southern combshell
- Subgenus Torulosa
  - Epioblasma ahlstedti - Duck River oyster mussel
  - †Epioblasma biemarginata - Angled riffleshell
  - Epioblasma capsaeformis - Oyster mussel
  - †Epioblasma cincinnatiensis - Cincinnati Riffleshell
  - Epioblasma florentina
    - Epioblasma florentina aureola - Golden riffleshell
    - Epioblasma florentina curtisii - Curtis pearlymussel
    - †Epioblasma florentina florentina - Yellow blossom
    - Epioblasma florentina walkeri - Tan riffleshell
  - †Epioblasma propinqua - Tennessee riffleshell
  - †Epioblasma sampsonii - Wabash riffleshell
  - Epioblasma torulosa
    - †Epioblasma torulosa gubernaculum - Green blossom
    - Epioblasma torulosa rangiana - Northern riffleshell
    - †Epioblasma torulosa torulosa - Tubercled blossom
  - †Epioblasma turgidula - Turgid riffle shell
- Subgenus Truncillopsis
  - Epioblasma triquetra - Snuffbox

== Conservation status ==
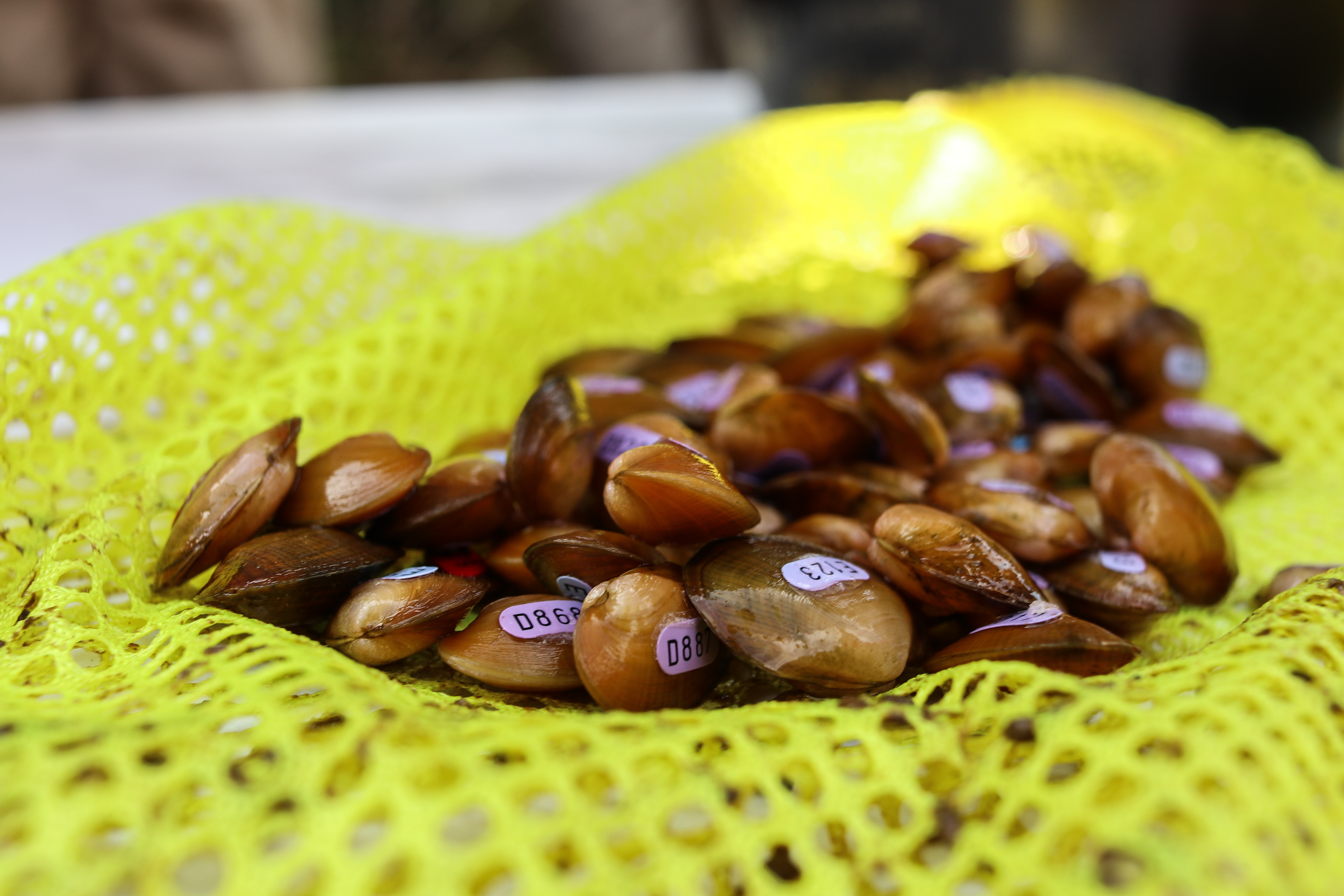
In September, 2017, a total of 700 golden riffleshell mussels, a federally-endangered species, were released into the Clinch River and Indian Creek. The release comes nearly twenty years after a chemical spill from an overturned tanker truck eliminated the mussel from the Clinch River; and after years of work to rear the animal in captivity by the states of Virginia and Kentucky as well as the U.S. Fish and Wildlife Service and Virginia Tech.

This entire genus is imperiled. In this genus, 15 species or subspecies are believed to be extinct. Of those remaining, all are federally protected species in the United States. The last to be listed as a federally endangered species was Epioblasma triquetra, which was listed in 2012.

This group of freshwater mussels is threatened primarily by habitat alteration as are other freshwater mussels. Dams, erosion, and pollution appear to be the primarily threats. Some workers recognize additional species not currently on the official list of recognized species.

== Gallery ==
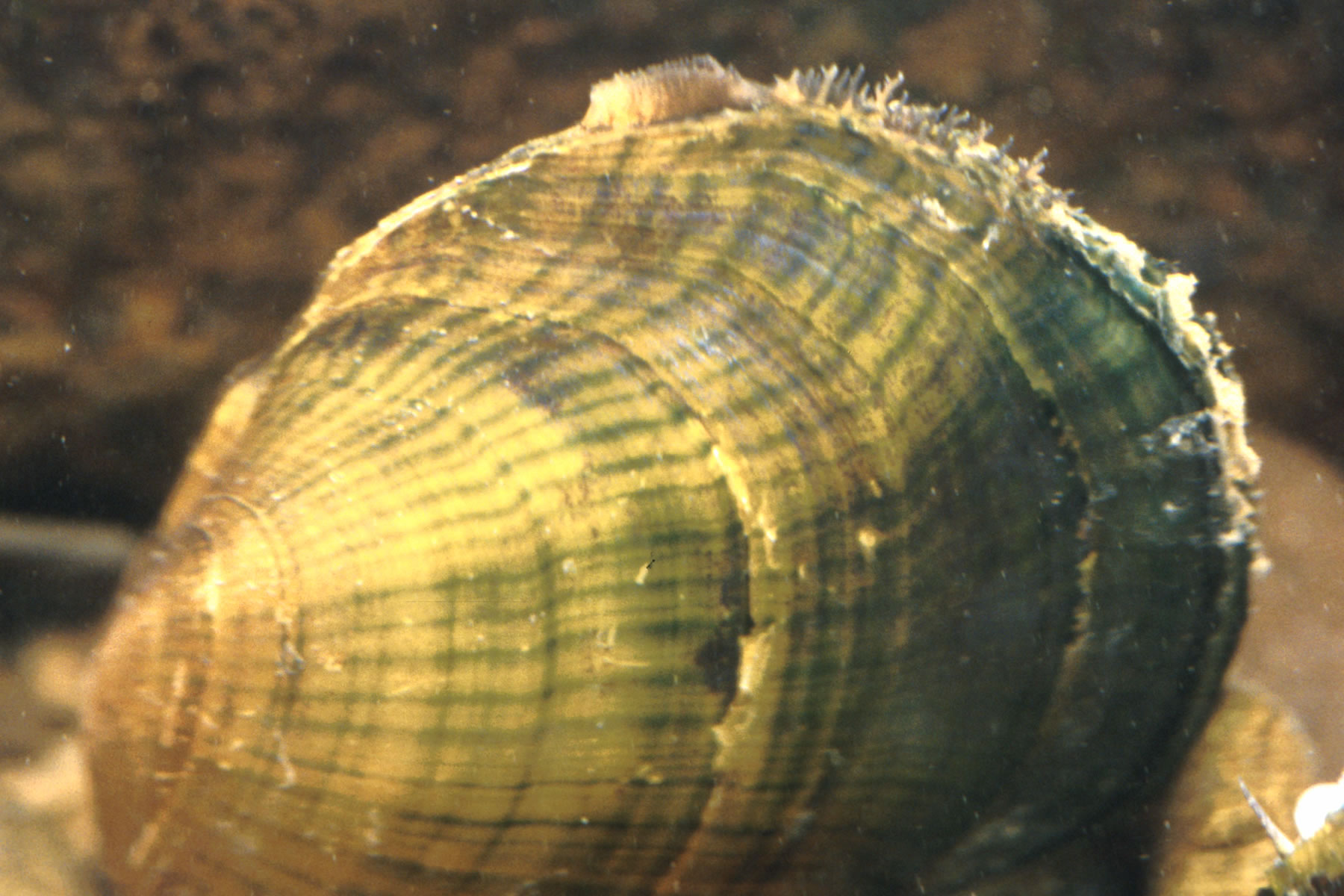
Epioblasma capsaeformis

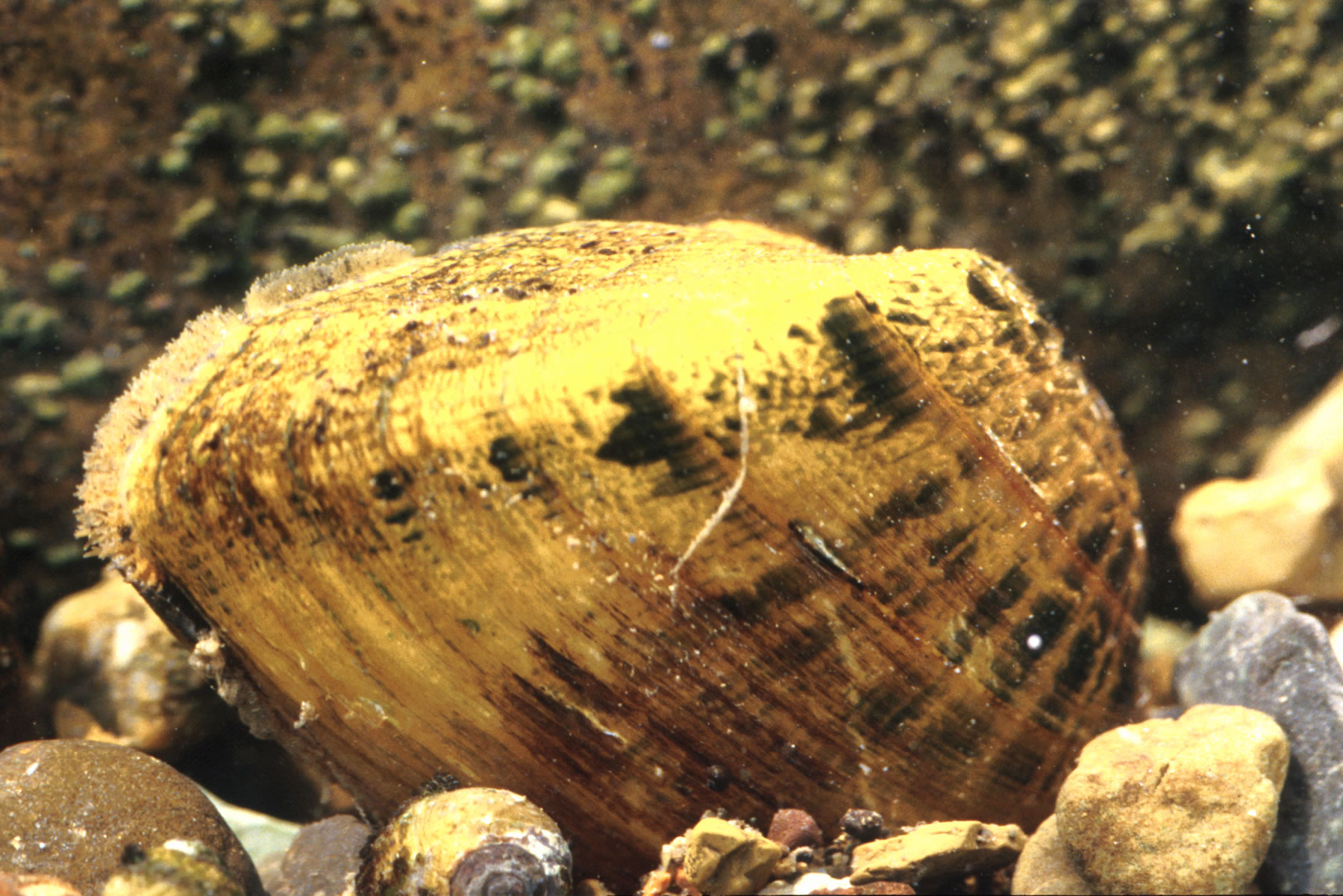
Epioblasma triquetra

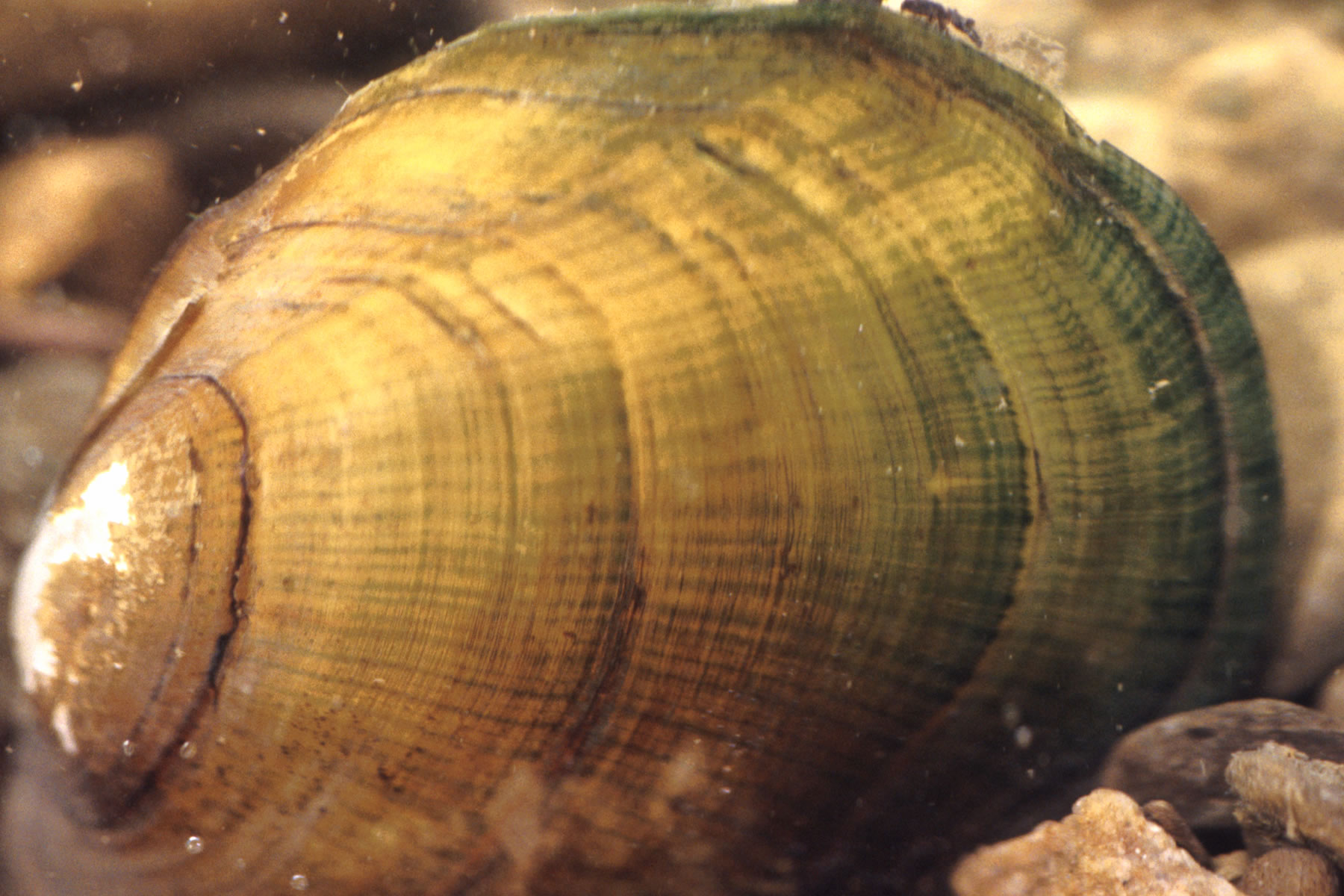
Epioblasma walkeri
