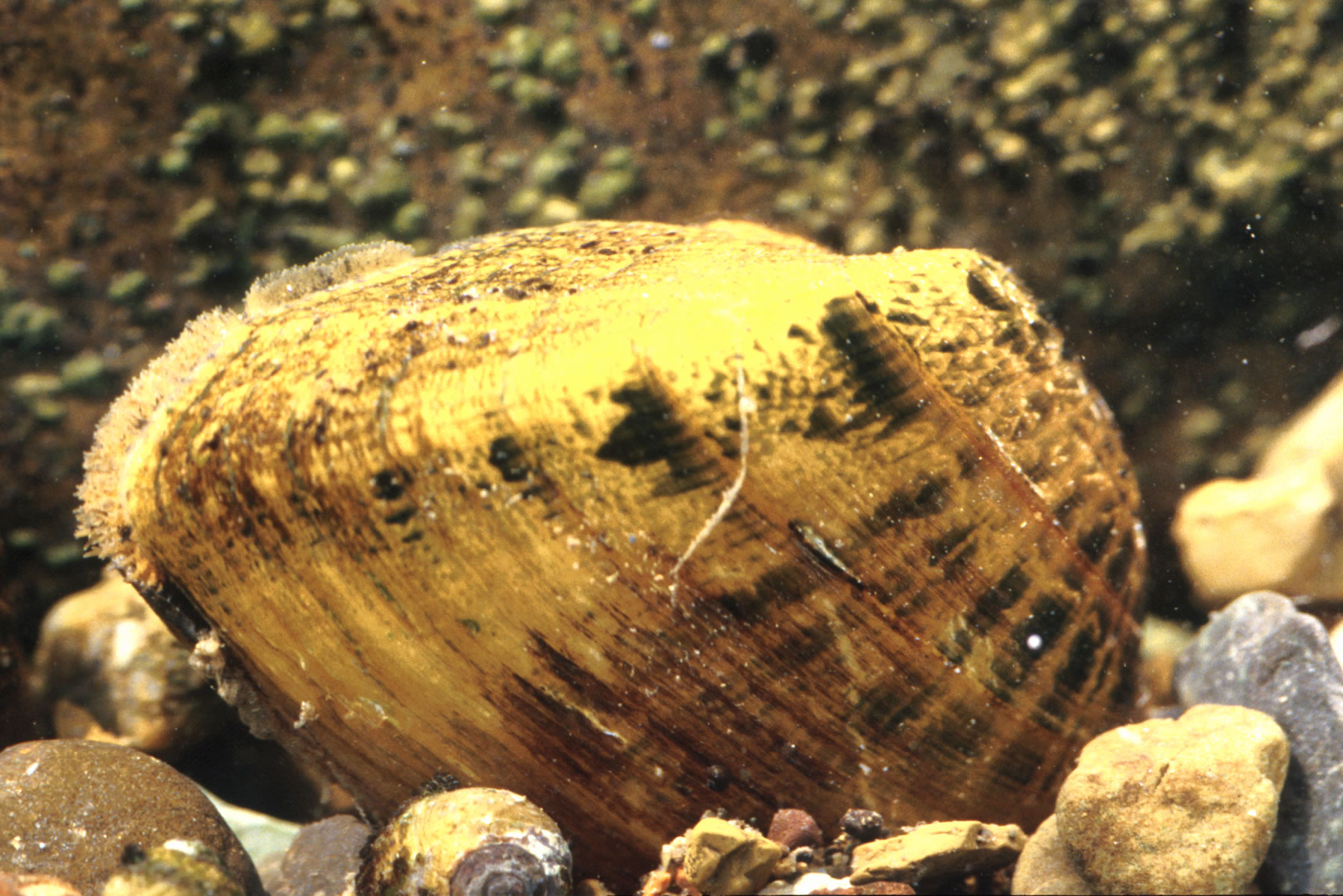

Conservation status
- Endangered (IUCN 3.1)

- Vulnerable (NatureServe)
- Endangered (ESA)

Scientific classification
- Kingdom: Animalia
- Phylum: Mollusca
- Class: Bivalvia
- Order: Unionida
- Family: Unionidae
- Genus: Epioblasma
- Species: E. triquetra

Binomial name
- Epioblasma triquetra (Rafinesque, 1820)

= Epioblasma triquetra =

Species of bivalve

Epioblasma triquetra, common name the snuffbox mussel, is a species of freshwater mussel, a mollusk in the family Unionidae. It is native to eastern North America, where it is a listed as an endangered species in both Canada and the United States.

== Distribution and ecology ==
This species lives in the Great Lakes system and Mississippi River system. Its natural habitat is riffles and shoals of rocky rivers, and the shores of lakes with wave activity. This species is declining throughout its range due to habitat destruction, siltation, pollution, and competition with invasive species. Despite this, it remains the most widespread and abundant member of the genus Epioblasma, of which the other members are now either extinct or severely imperiled.

== Reproduction ==
All Unionidae are known to use the gills, fins, or skin of a host fish for nutrients during the larval glochidia stage. In 2004, it was discovered that female Epioblasma triquetra mussels lure the unsuspecting fish towards them, then quickly clamp onto the head of the host fish and pump the glochidia larvae into their gills. The primary confirmed host fish for Epioblasma triquetra was found to be the common logperch, due to it being able to survive this violent encounter.
