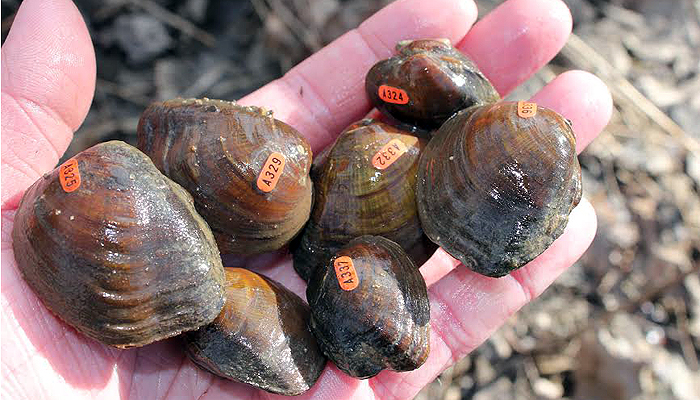

Conservation status
- Critically Imperiled (NatureServe)

- Endangered (ESA)

Scientific classification
- Kingdom: Animalia
- Phylum: Mollusca
- Class: Bivalvia
- Order: Unionida
- Family: Unionidae
- Genus: Epioblasma
- Species: E. obliquata

Binomial name
- Epioblasma obliquata (Raf., 1820)

Synonyms
- Obliquaria (Scalenaria) obliquata Rafinesque, 1820; Dysnomia obliquata (Rafinesque, 1820); Dysnomia obliquata subsp. obliquata (Rafinesque, 1820); Dysnomia (Pilea) sulcata (I.Lea, 1829); Dysnomia (Pilea) sulcata subsp. pectita (Conrad, 1854); Epioblasma obliquata subsp. obliquata (Rafinesque, 1820); Epioblasma sulcata subsp. sulcata (I.Lea, 1829); Epioblasma (Scalenilla) sulcata (I.Lea, 1829); Margarita (Unio) sulcatus (I.Lea, 1829); Margaron (Unio) sulcatus (I.Lea, 1829); Plagiola obliquata (Rafinesque, 1820); Plagiola ridibundus (Say, 1829); Pleurobema obliquata (Rafinesque, 1820); Quadrula obliquata (Rafinesque, 1820); Truncilla sulcata (I.Lea, 1829); Unio flagellatus Say, 1830; Unio pectitus Conrad, 1854; Unio perplexus Say, 1829; Unio propesulcatus de Gregorio, 1914; Unio ridibundus Say, 1829; Unio stewardsonii subsp. stewensoni de Gregorio, 1914; Unio sulcatus I.Lea, 1829

= Epioblasma obliquata =

Species of bivalve

Epioblasma obliquata, commonly called the catspaw, is a species of freshwater mussel. It is native to eastern North America, where it is classified as endangered under the Endangered Species Act. There are two subspecies, each with distinct morphology. Due to species rarity, the behavior of this organism is unknown beyond general freshwater mussel behavior.

== Natural history and conservation ==
This species was historically widespread in the Ohio River and Great Lakes drainage basins. Like many other North American freshwater mussels, it relies on a habitat of shallow, gravelly riffle zones in larger rivers. This oxygen-rich habitat has largely been destroyed over the past 200 years by dam construction and dredging, which caused a massive population decline. Freshwater mussels also face the major threats of water temperature, water velocity, and turbidity changes. These factors add great stress on the survival of these mussels in their respective environments. They change the ecophysiology of the organisms and change the way they are able to interact with their resources and surroundings.

Both subspecies, the white catspaw and the purple catspaw, are critically endangered. By the time E. obliquata obliquata, the purple catspaw, was listed in 1990 under the Endangered Species Act, no surviving breeding populations were known. This changed in 1994 when a few young individuals were found in Killbuck Creek, Ohio, indicating a small breeding population. An attempt to collect young individuals was made in order to start a captive breeding program. However, to the researchers disappointment, surveys from 2006–2007 recorded a population of only 12 males and zero females. It wasn't until 2012 that researchers were able to find their first female individuals that could be used for captive breeding programs, which are now underway.

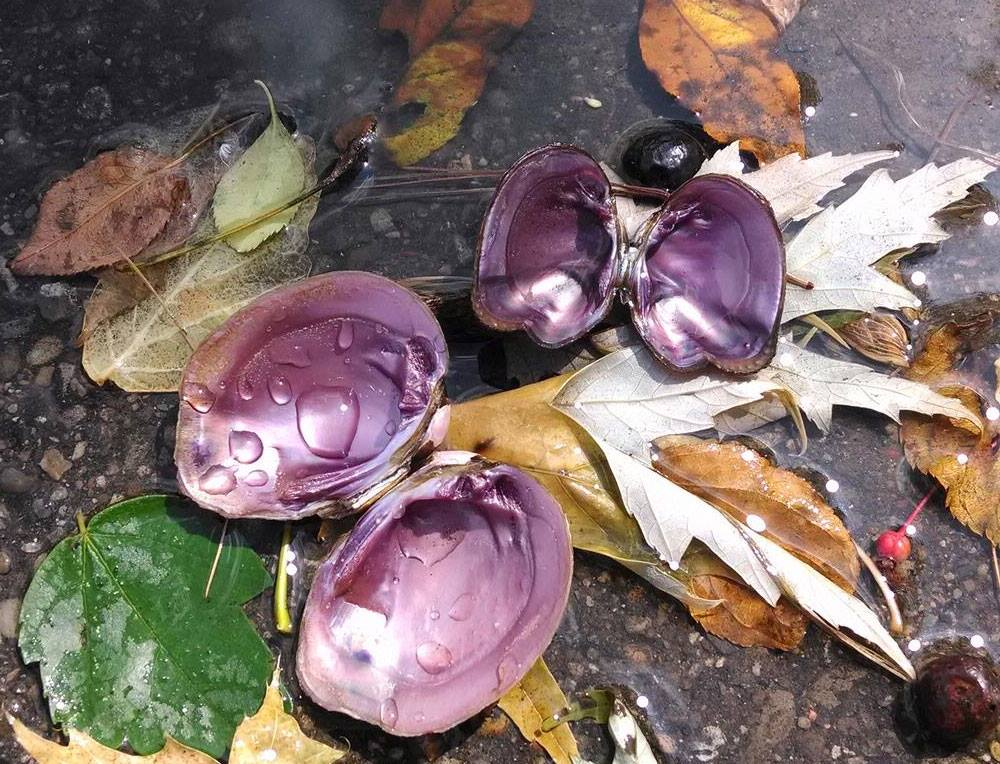
The purple nacre is characteristic of subspecies obliqua, the purple catspaw

The status of subspecies E. obliquata perobliqua, the white catspaw, is more dire. Only a single population has persisted into the modern day, found in Fish Creek, a tributary of the St. Joseph River in Indiana. At this location, only five living individuals were documented during surveys from 1975 to 1999, with the last living female recorded in 1975. Since then, surveys of Fish Creek have failed to find any living white catspaw mussels.

== Taxonomy ==
This species exhibits variable shell characteristics, which have been taxonomically treated as either subspecies or separate species. Citing phylogeny, shell characteristics and allopatry, the Fish and Wildlife Service, supported by Williams et al. (2017), has separated the purple and white catspaws into distinct species, each protected by the Endangered Species Act as an endangered species.

- Purple catspaw (Epioblasma obliquata obliquata), now protected federally as Epioblasma obliquata
- White catspaw (Epioblasma obliquata perobliqua), now protected federally as Epioblasma perobliqua (Conrad, 1836)

== Organism Description ==
One of the subspecies, the white catspaw, exhibits morphological differences between the sexes. The males have shells that are more oval-like and the grooves are deeper than those of the female. The shell of the females appear to resemble more of a rectangle than the oval. The outer layer of the shell is a tannish color while the iridescent interior is a pearly white. Overall, the mussel is around 2 inches.

The purple catspaw has a yellow/green/brownish shell surface with a deep purple iridescent interior. This subspecies demonstrates different sex morphologies as well with the male shell narrower than the wider shell of the female. Males can be up to 70mm.

== Behavior ==
Due to the rarity of both subspecies, reproduction timing is unknown. Maturation, developmental morphology, and lifespan have not been observed. These muscles are filter feeders through and consuming what food available floating through the water. Basic organismal research needs to be done on the catspaw mussel if there is any hope of reintroduction to its historical ranges.
