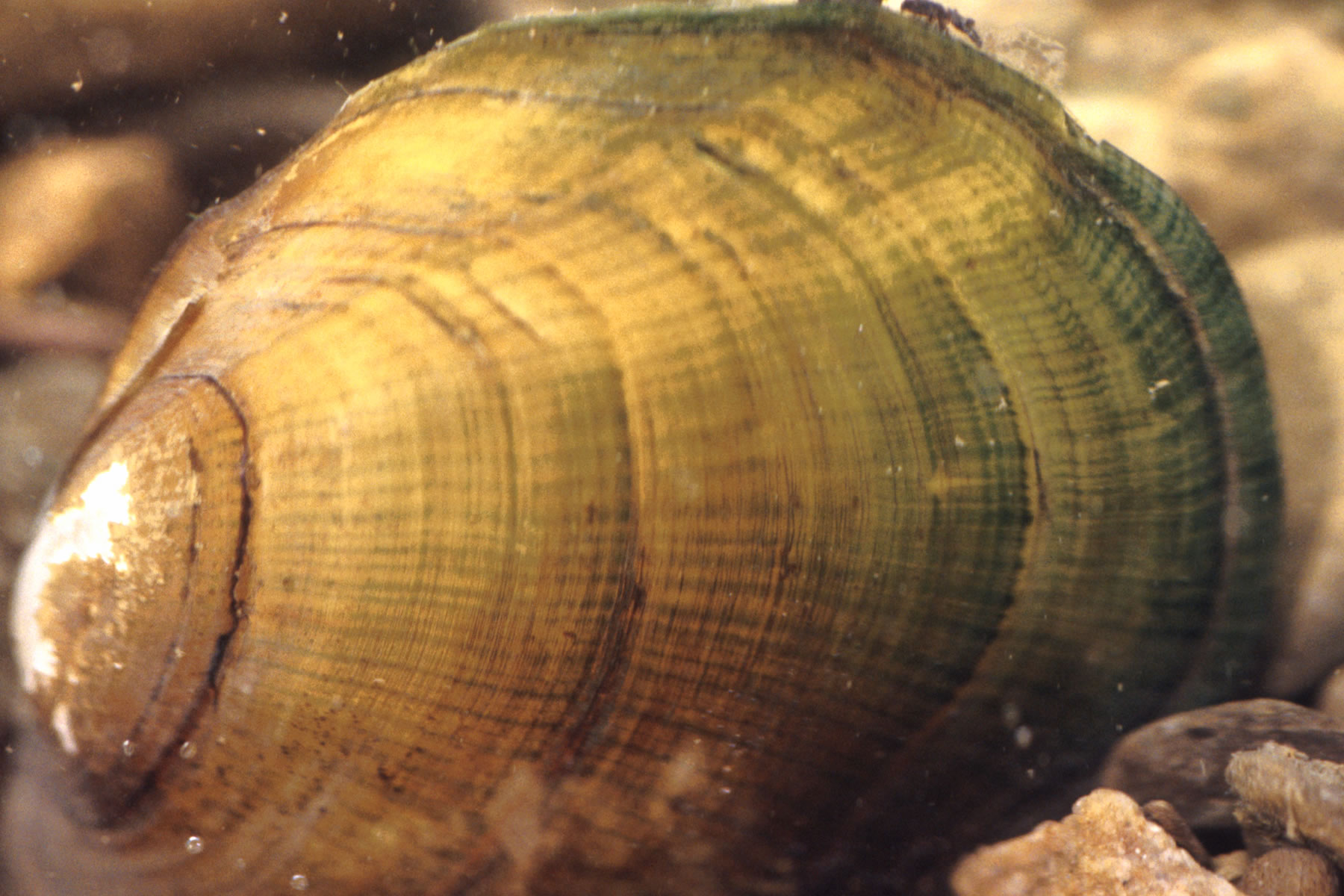

Conservation status
- Critically Endangered (IUCN 2.3)

- Critically Imperiled (NatureServe)
- Endangered (ESA)

Scientific classification
- Kingdom: Animalia
- Phylum: Mollusca
- Class: Bivalvia
- Order: Unionida
- Family: Unionidae
- Genus: Epioblasma
- Species: E. walkeri

Binomial name
- Epioblasma walkeri (Wilson & H.W. Clark, 1914)

Synonyms
- Epioblasma florentina walkeri

= Epioblasma walkeri =

Species of bivalve

Epioblasma walkeri, common name the tan riffleshell, is a species of freshwater mussel, an aquatic bivalve mollusk in the family Unionidae, the river mussels.

Many scientists now recognize this mussel as synonymous or a subspecies of the presumed extinct Epioblasma florentina due to integrating shell characteristics between them.

At the time of its listing in 1977 under the Endangered Species Act of 1973, its range was limited to the lower Red River (Cumberland system), the middle fork of the Holston River, a possible population in the Stones River, the Duck River, where its population was threatened by a proposed Tennessee Valley Authority dam, and the Clinch River. The population in Indian Creek in the upper Clinch River basin was proposed as a separate subspecies by Jones, Neves, Ahlstedt and Hallerman in 2006.

It is listed under Appendix I of the Convention on International Trade in Endangered Species of Wild Fauna and Flora.
