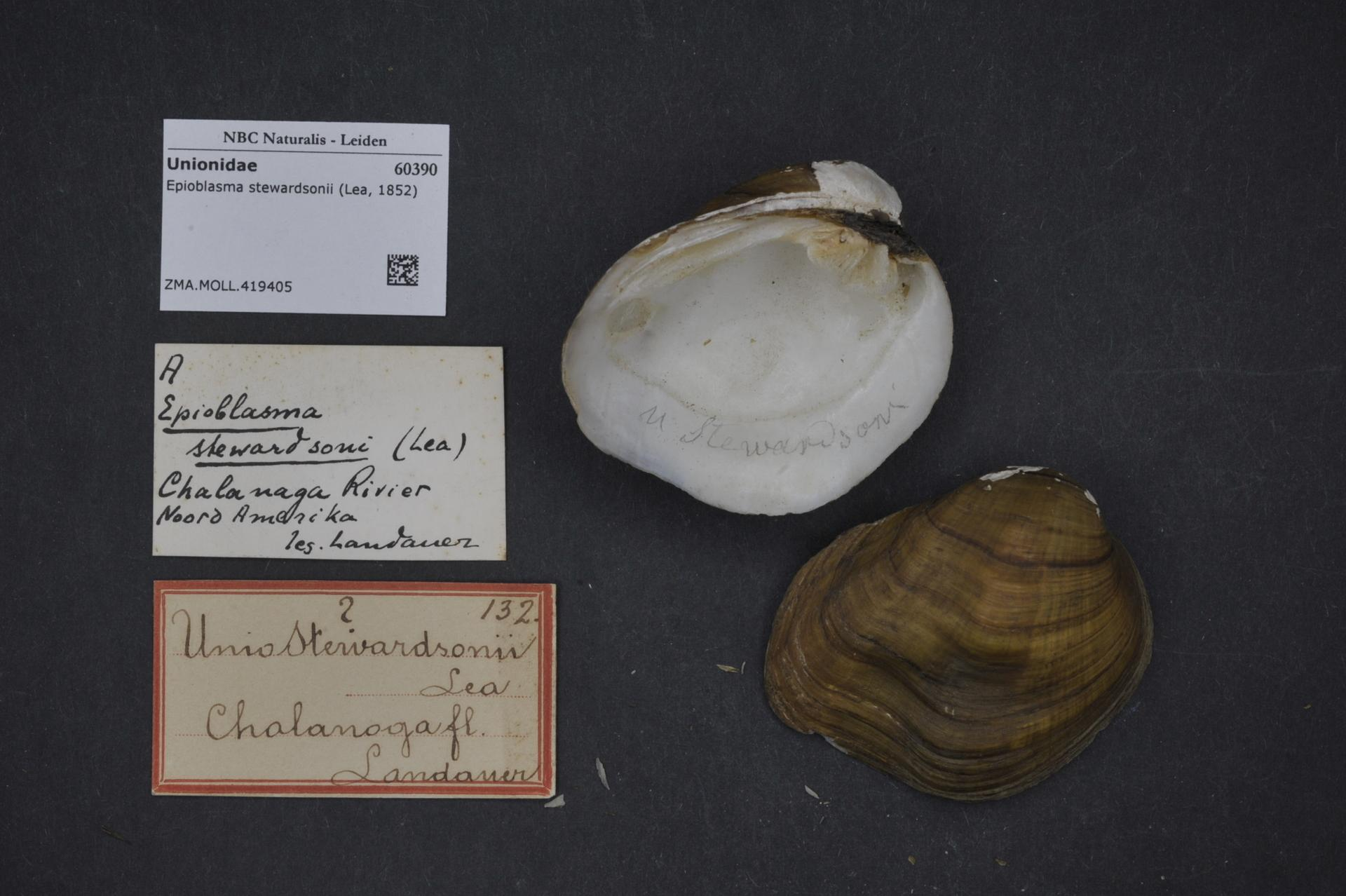

Conservation status
- Extinct (IUCN 2.3)

- Presumed Extinct (NatureServe)

Scientific classification
- Kingdom: Animalia
- Phylum: Mollusca
- Class: Bivalvia
- Order: Unionida
- Family: Unionidae
- Genus: Epioblasma
- Species: †E. stewardsonii

Binomial name
- †Epioblasma stewardsonii (I. Lea, 1852)

Synonyms
- Dysnomia stewardsoni I. Lea, 1852

= Epioblasma stewardsonii =

Extinct species of bivalve

Epioblasma stewardsonii, the Cumberland leafshell or Steward's pearly mussel, is an extinct species of freshwater mussel in the family Unionidae.

This species was endemic to the drainages of the Cumberland River and the Tennessee River in the United States. Its natural habitat was riffle areas in large- to medium-size rivers. Like most other members of this sensitive genus, it became extinct due habitat destruction and pollution. The last documented occurrence of this species was in 1909.

It appears to be most closely related to Epioblasma flexuosa, which is also now extinct.
