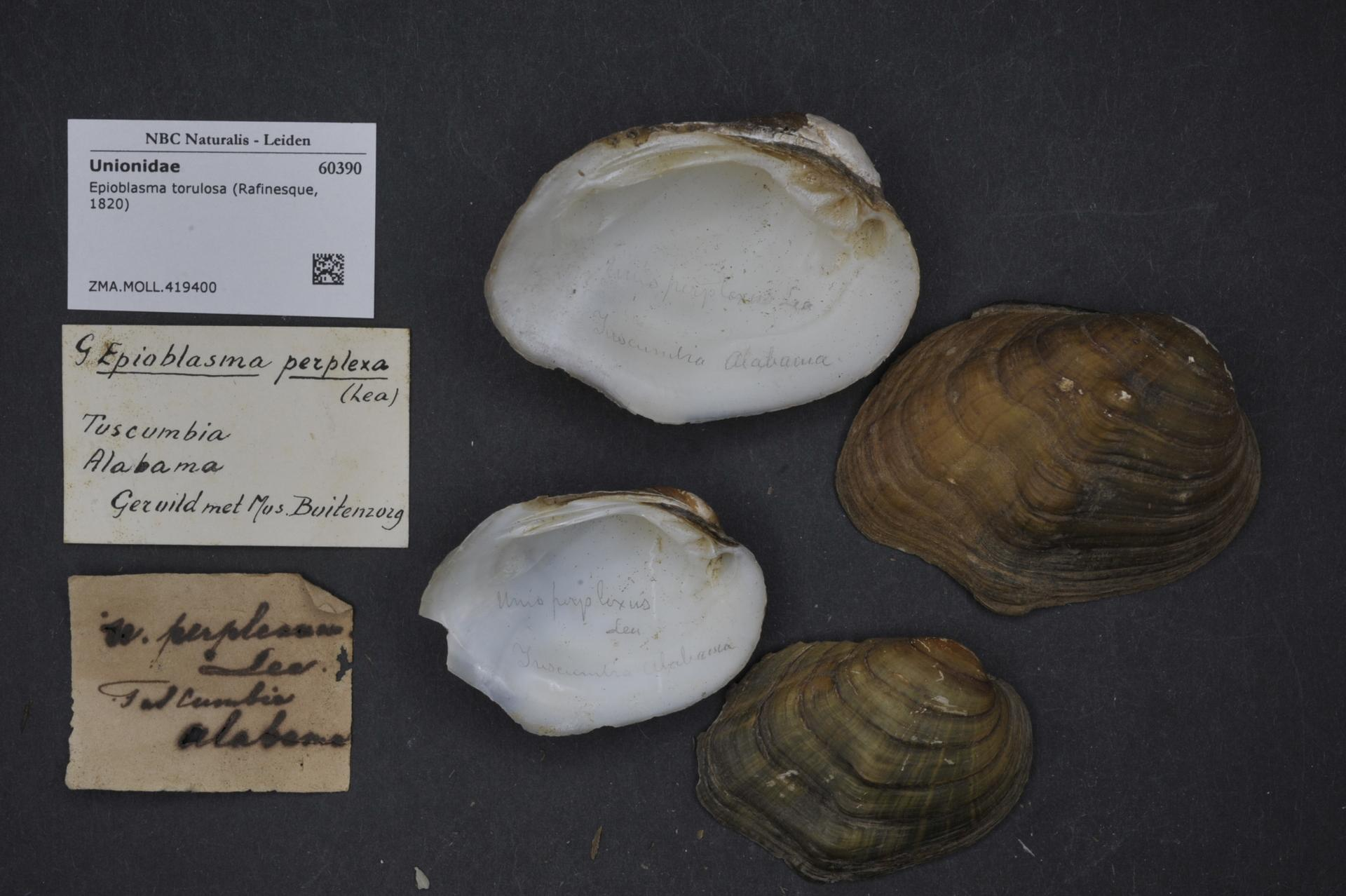

Conservation status
- Critically Endangered (IUCN 3.1)
- CITES Appendix I

Scientific classification
- Kingdom: Animalia
- Phylum: Mollusca
- Class: Bivalvia
- Order: Unionida
- Family: Unionidae
- Genus: Epioblasma
- Species: E. torulosa

Binomial name
- Epioblasma torulosa Raf.

= Epioblasma torulosa =

Species of bivalve

Epioblasma torulosa, commonly called the tubercled blossom, is a species of freshwater mussel, a mollusk in the family Unionidae. It is native to eastern North America, where it is considered endangered in both Canada and the United States. The US Fish and Wildlife Service declared the Green and Tubercled blossom subspecies extinct and delisted it from the Endangered Species Act on October 16, 2023.

== Natural history ==
This species is known from the Cumberland, Ohio, St. Lawrence, and Tennessee River drainages. It is found in shallow riffle zones over sand and gravel in large to medium-sized rivers. Due to habitat destruction, siltation, and other factors, two out of the three subspecies are now extinct. The surviving subspecies is considered highly imperiled, with only three known locations showing evidence of reproduction.

== Subspecies ==
This species exhibits variable shell characteristics across its geographic range. It is unclear whether this is best understood as ecophenotypic variation, various subspecies, or a complex of closely related but genetically isolated species. Due to the extinction of three of the four subspecies often included, resolution of this question will be difficult. The most modern approach is to treat E. torulosa as a species with three subspecies, and separate out the closely related Epioblasma cincinnatiensis as a full species.

- Green blossom (Epioblasma torulosa gubernaculum): Extinct. Known from the headwaters of the Tennessee River.
- Northern riffleshell (Epioblasma torulosa rangiana)
- Tubercled blossom (Epioblasma torulosa torulosa): Extinct. Known from the main stem of large rivers.
