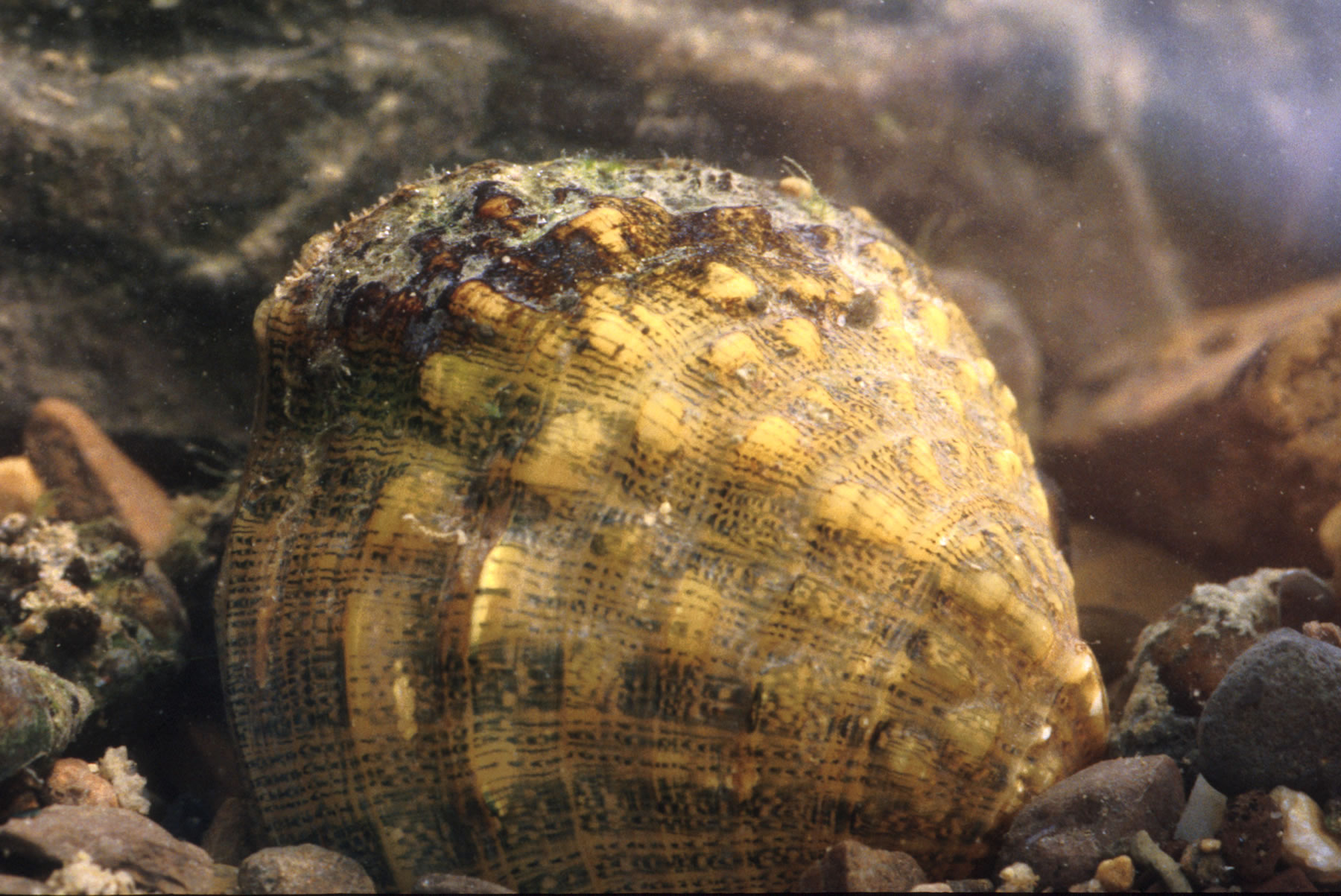
- Cyprogenia stegaria

Scientific classification
- Kingdom: Animalia
- Phylum: Mollusca
- Class: Bivalvia
- Order: Unionida
- Family: Unionidae
- Tribe: Lampsilini
- Genus: Cyprogenia; Agassiz, 1852

= Cyprogenia =

Genus of bivalves

Cyprogenia is a genus of freshwater mussels, aquatic bivalve mollusks in the family Unionidae.

== Species within the genus Cyprogenia ==
- Cyprogenia aberti (edible naiad)
- Cyprogenia stegaria (fanshell)

Unionids are one of the most endangered fauna in the world due to water quality degradation and other human activities. Unionid reproductive strategies involve a parasitic life stage on a host fish and, in most species, involve lures that mimic prey to attract the host fish or amphibian, and the glochidia latch onto the host's gills for nutrients. The main types of natural fish lures: dispensing lures, trapping lures, conglutinate lures and mantle lures.
