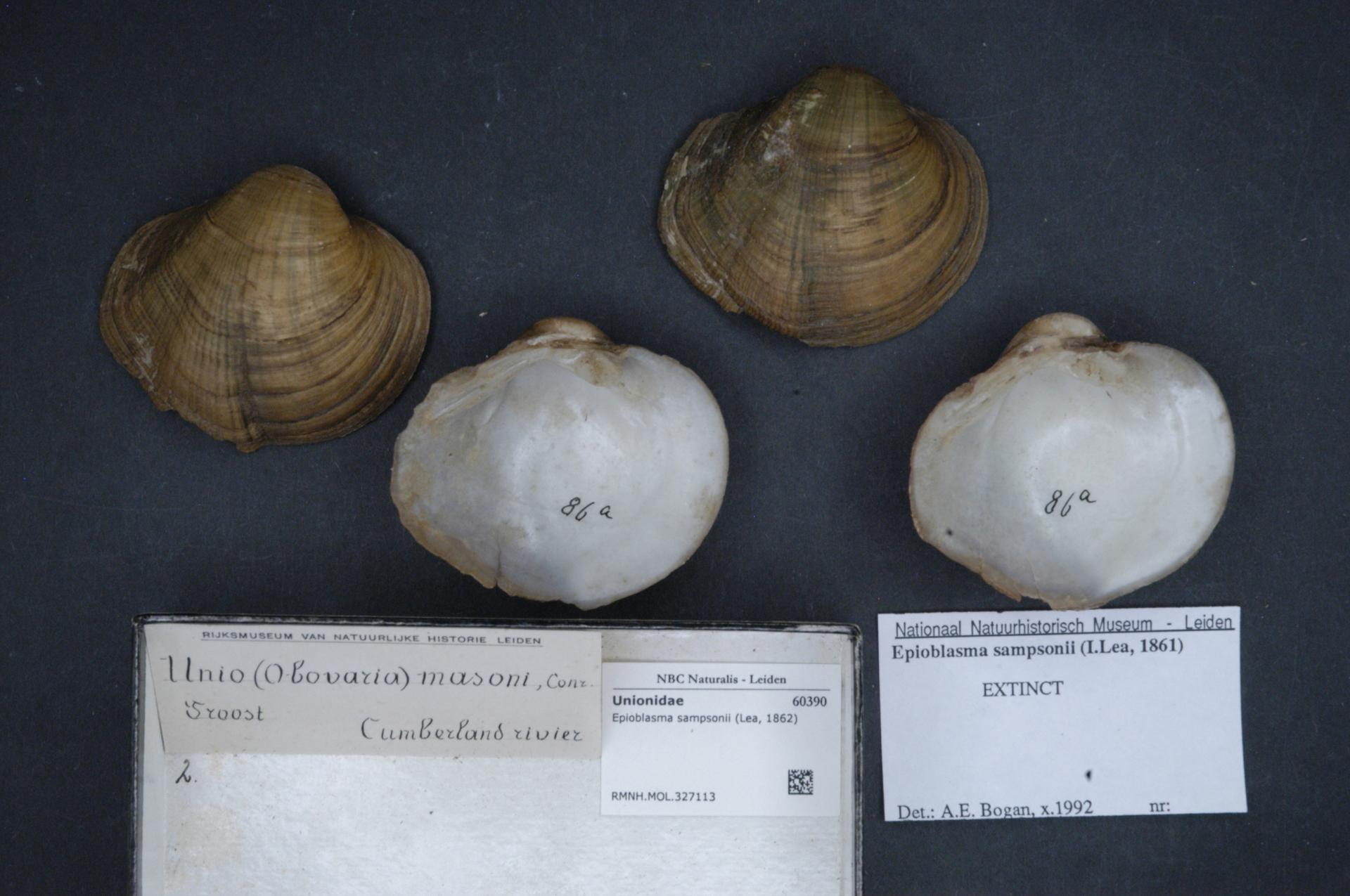

Conservation status
- Extinct (IUCN 2.3)

- Presumed Extinct (NatureServe)

Scientific classification
- Kingdom: Animalia
- Phylum: Mollusca
- Class: Bivalvia
- Order: Unionida
- Family: Unionidae
- Genus: Epioblasma
- Species: †E. sampsonii

Binomial name
- †Epioblasma sampsonii (Lea, 1861)

Synonyms
- Dysnomia sampsoni Lea, 1861

= Epioblasma sampsonii =

Species of bivalve

Epioblasma sampsonii, the Wabash riffleshell or Sampson's naiad, was a species of freshwater mussel in the family Unionidae. It is now extinct.

The species was endemic to the United States, where it was found in the drainages of the Ohio River, living in gravel and sand shoals. Like all other members of its genus, its populations declined greatly from early dam and canal construction. The extinction of this species is believed to have occurred sometime in the early 20th century.

Little is known about the biology and ecology of this species.
