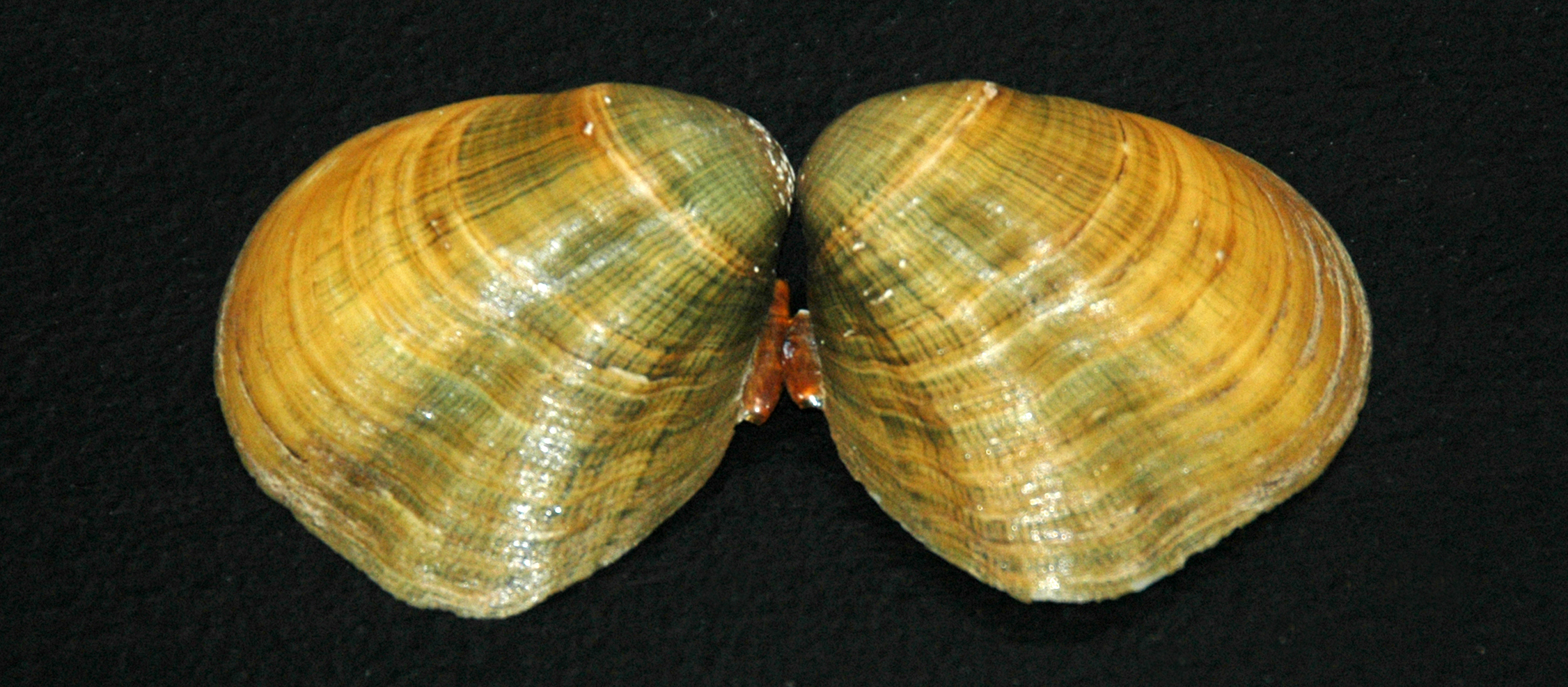

Conservation status
- Extinct (IUCN 3.1)

- Presumed Extinct (NatureServe)

Scientific classification
- Kingdom: Animalia
- Phylum: Mollusca
- Class: Bivalvia
- Order: Unionida
- Family: Unionidae
- Genus: Epioblasma
- Species: †E. personata

Binomial name
- †Epioblasma personata (Say, 1829)

Synonyms
- Dysnomia personata Say, 1829

= Epioblasma personata =

Extinct species of bivalve

Epioblasma personata, the round combshell or fine-rayed pearly mussel, is an extinct species of freshwater mussel in the family Unionidae. It was endemic to the drainages of the Tennessee River and Ohio River in the United States.

Little is known about the habitat of this species beyond its preference for medium-sized rivers. It appears to have been particularly sensitive to water quality degradation, and its populations diminished quickly after industrialization. No live individuals have been seen since the 1924.
