= Epioblasma lenior =

Conservation status
- Extinct (IUCN 2.3)

- Presumed Extinct (NatureServe)

Scientific classification
- Kingdom: Animalia
- Phylum: Mollusca
- Class: Bivalvia
- Order: Unionida
- Family: Unionidae
- Genus: Epioblasma
- Species: †E. lenior

Binomial name
- †Epioblasma lenior (I. Lea, 1842)

Synonyms
- Dysnomia lenior I. Lea, 1842

Species of bivalve

Epioblasma lenior, the narrow catspaw or Stone's pearly mussel, was a species of freshwater mussel, an aquatic bivalve mollusk in the family Unionidae, the river mussels.

This species was endemic to the Tennessee River system in the United States. Its natural habitat was gravel and sand in clear, fast flowing water. It became extinct due to habitat loss and pollution. The last remaining population was in the Stones River, Tennessee, which was killed by the construction of the J. Percy Priest Dam in 1967.
