= Forkshell =

Conservation status
- Extinct (IUCN 2.3)

- Presumed Extinct (NatureServe)

Scientific classification
- Kingdom: Animalia
- Phylum: Mollusca
- Class: Bivalvia
- Order: Unionida
- Family: Unionidae
- Genus: Epioblasma
- Species: †E. lewisii

Binomial name
- †Epioblasma lewisii (Walker, 1910)

Synonyms
- Dysnomia lewisii Walker, 1910

Extinct species of bivalve

The forkshell or Lewis pearly mussel, scientific name Epioblasma lewisii, was a species of freshwater mussel, an aquatic bivalve mollusk in the family Unionidae, the river mussels.

This species was endemic to the drainages of the Cumberland River and the Tennessee River in the United States, with one specimen reported from the Ohio River near Cincinnati, Ohio. Its natural habitat was shallow riffle-beds of large rivers. This habitat was largely destroyed by dam construction and canalization, and the last populations of this species died sometime during the middle of the 20th century. Only a single museum specimen was collected that preserved the internal soft tissues.

It appears to be closely related to Epioblasma flexuosa, which is also now extinct.
