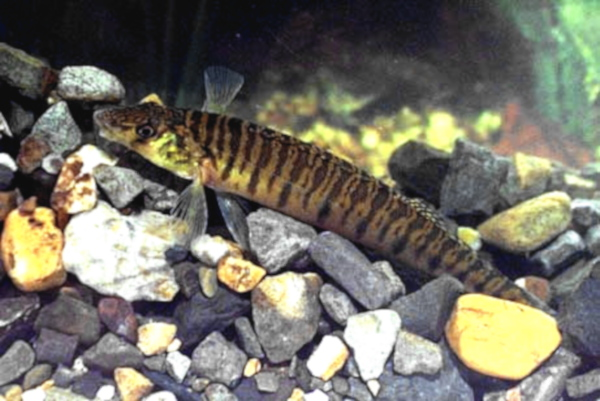

Conservation status
- Least Concern (IUCN 3.1)

Scientific classification
- Kingdom: Animalia
- Phylum: Chordata
- Class: Actinopterygii
- Division: Teleostei
- Order: Perciformes
- Family: Percidae
- Genus: Percina
- Species: P. caprodes

Binomial name
- Percina caprodes (Rafinesque, 1818)

Synonyms
- Catostomus fasciolaris Rafinesque, 1820; Percina manitou D.S. Jordan, 1877; Percina (Perca) nebulosa Haldeman, 1842; Pileoma semifasciatum DeKay, 1842; Pileoma zebra Agassiz, 1850

= Common logperch =

Species of fish

The common logperch (Percina caprodes), sometimes simply known as the logperch, is a species of freshwater ray-finned fish, a darter from the subfamily Etheostomatinae, part of the family Percidae, which also contains the perches, ruffes and pikeperches. Like other logperches, it has the typical vertical barring along the flank and a subterminal mouth.

This is the most widespread logperch, commonly found in large parts of the eastern United States and Canada. Like other logperches, they inhabit clear, gravelly streams and lakes, reaching a maximum size of about 18 centimeters (7.1 in) and a maximum age of about 3 years. They play a key role in the reproduction of the snuffbox mussel (Epioblasma triquetra).

== Abstract ==
The common logperch is a darter species naturally occurring as far north as the St. Lawrence River in Canada, as far west as the Great Lakes, and south throughout the Mississippi River down to the Rio Grande. The common logperch is also found as far west as California, where it was introduced in 1953. Logperch are benthic, nonguarding egglayers, whose embryos drift to lentic areas after hatching. The population distribution of the common logperch may be under increased predatory pressure from stocked saugeyes. Dams may also exert stress on the fish, by obstructing migratory pathways and inhibiting gene flow. Percina caprodes have also been found to be extremely susceptible to nitrite poisoning. While the common logperch is not currently listed as a threatened or endangered species, humans should be aware of our negative impact on the species, and the ways in which we can minimize this impact; most notably, by limiting the construction of dams, by increasing oxygen levels in the tailwaters of existing dams, by limiting the number of predatory gamefish stocked (such as saugeye), by decreasing the amount of silt and debris deposited in streams, and by monitoring nitrite levels in common logperch habitats. Also, a monitoring plan should be created, in which a routine census is taken of the fish in each area of its distribution, and in which invasive species that outcompete the common logperch, such as Neogobius melanostomus, are removed.

== Geographic distribution of species ==
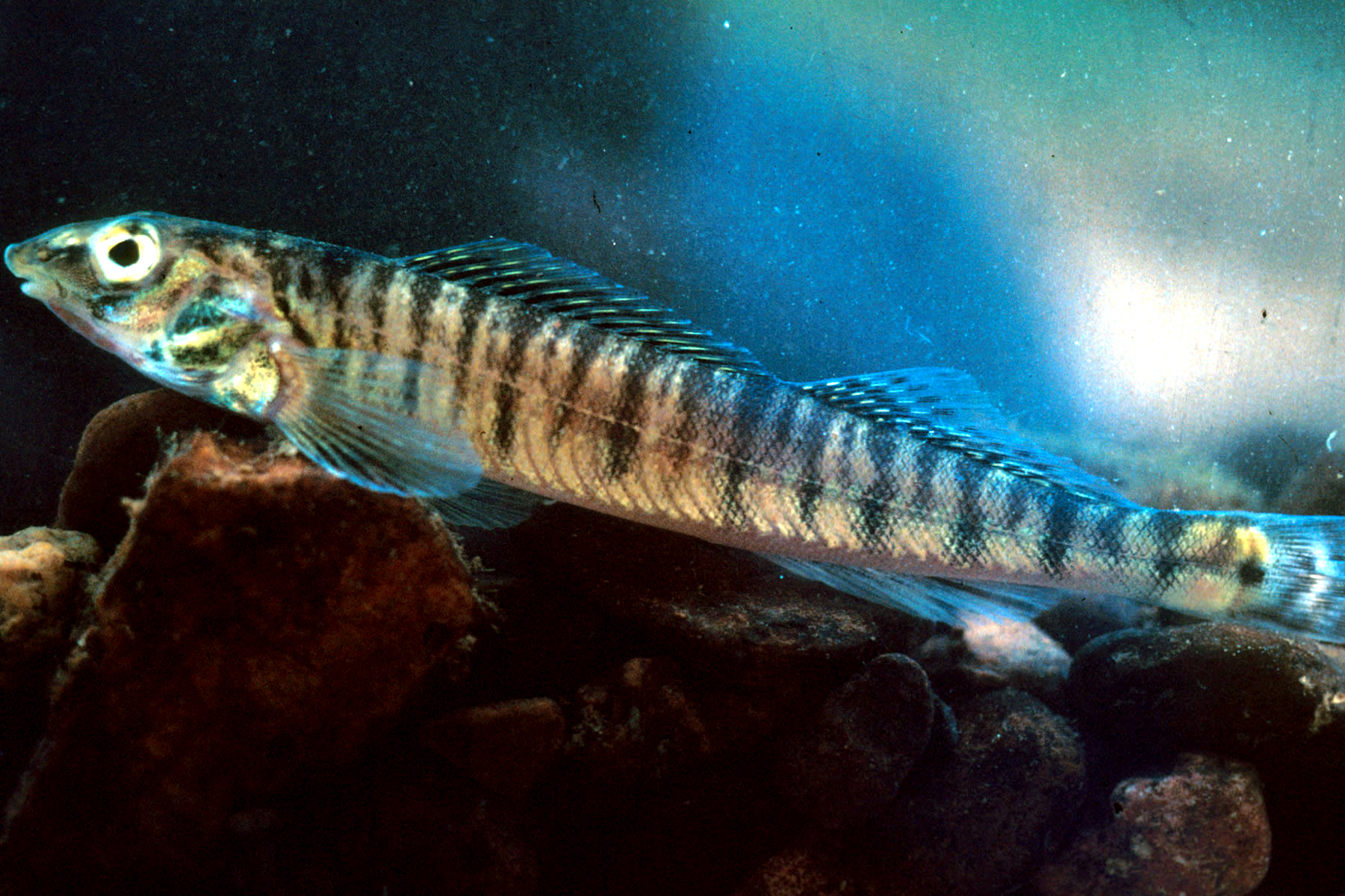

The common logperch exhibits a rather large geographic distribution and range. The common logperch occurs naturally as far north as the St. Lawrence River system in Quebec, and as far south as the Rio Grande system in southern Texas and northern Mexico. Westwards, logperch are most heavily distributed in the Mississippi River drainage system, and their range extends eastward in freshwater habitats all the way to the Atlantic Ocean. Currently, however, the range of the common logperch has been artificially extended into California, where it was released into the wild in 1953. The range of the common logperch, while impressive, has nevertheless been reduced due to the construction of dams, the introduction of stocked predatory species such as walleye and sauger, the introduction of invasive competitors (specifically Neogobius melanostomus), and possibly by erosion around drainage systems.

== Ecology ==
The common logperch, like most darter species, dwells in benthic habitats where it forages for food. It prefers clear, swift water with rocky or sandy substrate; however, it may be found in any temperate water in their geographic distribution. Its diet consists primarily of benthic invertebrates, which it hunts by flipping over stones with its snout. It appears that logperches are not especially fastidious when foraging, and that they are actually very opportunistic feeders. That being said, chironomids constitute the largest part of a darter's diet (~54% volumetric contribution), whereas trichopterans and simuliids constituted roughly 15% and 22% volumetric contribution, respectively. However, prey consumption can vary largely by location and season. Some competition surely exists between the common logperch and other benthic species with the same native distribution and diet. It is an invasive species, Neogobius melanostomus (round goby), however, that poses the largest competitive threat to the common logperch. Studies indicate that this is most likely because Neogobius melanostomus better utilizes its space in the environment for shelter, decreasing the range of the common logperch, because Neogobius melanostomus is also a more aggressive than the relatively passive common logperch, and because N. melanostomus reproduces at a higher rate than the common logperch. Natural predators of the common logperch consist most notably of carnivorous piscivores from the Sander, Micropterus, and Esox genera.

Human induced changes that might reduce the abundance of the common logperch include the excess stocking of piscivorous fish species, the damming of rivers, introduction of chemicals into watersheds, and erosion caused from human activities. While the top-down effects the addition of excess predators can cause on prey species are relatively well studied, the effects and mechanisms of the other aforementioned human activities may not be so clear.

== Life history ==
The common logperch does not reach sexual maturity until approximately 2 years of age. The common logperch spawns numerous times in the warmer months of the year, typically during spring and summer. They lay small demersal adhesive eggs that stick between rocks and substrate . Because of this, logperch tend to spawn in shallow rocky shoals, with high oxygen availability. Upon hatching, the pelagic embryos drift to lentic areas where plankton are more abundant in order to feed. Logperch eggs hatch much earlier than typical darter eggs. Thus, the common logperch has maintained its ancestral reproductive tendencies, and therefore has not evolved any new adaptations in comparison to other darter species. Some human-induced changes with negative effects on the life history of the common logperch include the construction of dams and erosion around water drainages.

== Current management ==
The common logperch is currently not a threatened or endangered fish species. Consequently, no apparent steps are being taken to manage the species.

While logperches are not currently a threatened species, several human-created changes are negatively influencing the common logperch. One of these human-induced changes is the construction of dams. Dams are detrimental to logperch for numerous reasons. Dams typically create less oxygen in their tailwaters. The water pushed into dam tailwaters comes from oxygen-poor parts of the dam's reservoir. This lack of oxygen can cause undue stress on the lungs of common logperch larvae which require oxygen rich water. Large amounts of silt created by the constant change of water flow by dams for hydroelectric generation is also detrimental to logperch species. The rocky substrate where Logperch hunt and spawn are covered and masked by these silt deposits. Human-initiated erosion also affects logperch. As a result, the common logperch obtains food less efficiently, and cannot spawn as efficiently.

The overuse of pesticides and fertilizers near watersheds can also have a deleterious effect on the common logperch by killing or altering aquatic insect life, and by increasing nitrite levels. But perhaps the most deleterious impact on the common logperch comes from the introduction of the round goby, Neogobius melanostomus, which outcompetes it. Through careful farm and land management, the introduction of chemicals to watersheds could be greatly reduced. Erosion can largely be avoided by halting deforestation, and the induction of invasive species may be reduced simply by better informing the public of the detrimental effects caused by releasing non-native species into the wild.

== Taxonomy ==
The common logperch was first formally described as Sciaena caprodes in 1818 by the French polymath Constantine Samuel Rafinesque (1783–1840) with the type locality given as the Ohio River. Samuel Stehman Haldeman created Percina as a subgenus of Perca and he described Perca (Percina) nebulosa was its only species, this is a synonym of P. caprodes. This means that the common logperch is the type species of the genus Percina.
