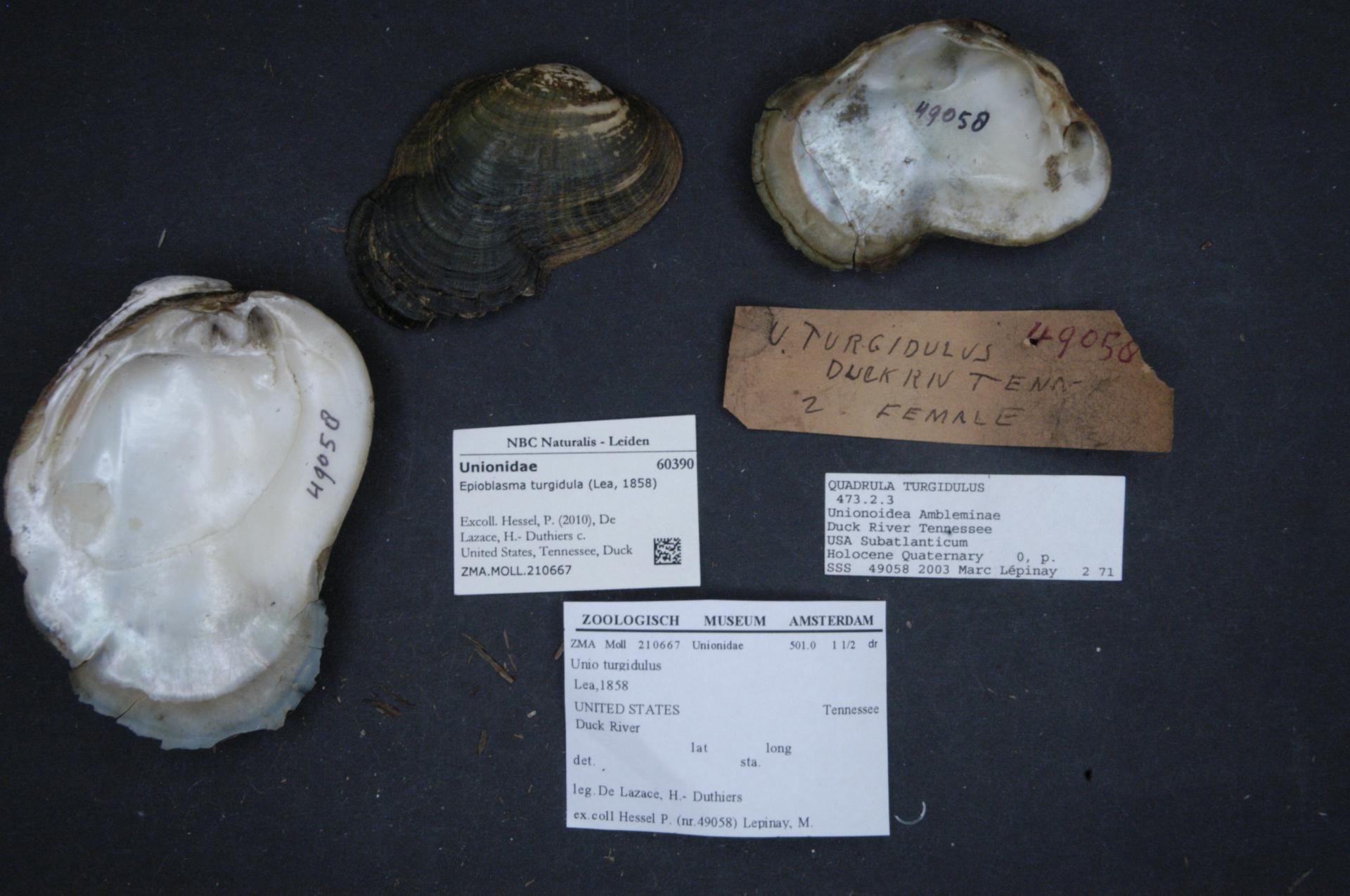

Conservation status
- Extinct (1972) (IUCN 2.3)

- Extinct (1972) (ESA)

Scientific classification
- Kingdom: Animalia
- Phylum: Mollusca
- Class: Bivalvia
- Order: Unionida
- Family: Unionidae
- Genus: Epioblasma
- Species: †E. turgidula

Binomial name
- †Epioblasma turgidula (Lea, 1858)

Synonyms
- Dysnomia turgidula Lea, 1858

= Epioblasma turgidula =

Species of bivalve

Epioblasma turgidula, the turgid blossom pearly mussel, turgid riffle shell, turgid-blossom naiad or turgid blossom, was a species of freshwater mussel, a mollusk in the family Unionidae. The US Fish and Wildlife Service declared the species extinct and delisted it from the Endangered Species Act in 2023.

This species was native to the United States, where it was found in the drainage of the Cumberland River, Tennessee River, and several rivers in the Ozark Mountains. Its natural habitat was riffles and shoals of medium rivers, which have now largely been destroyed by dam construction and dredging.

Like most other mussels in the sensitive genus Epioblasma, this species experienced severe declines during industrialization due to pollution, siltation and habitat destruction. The last known population was recorded in 1965 from the Duck River in Tennessee, near the town of Normandy. This population was killed by the construction of Normandy Dam in the following years. A recently dead specimen was collected in the Duck River at Normandy in 1972.
