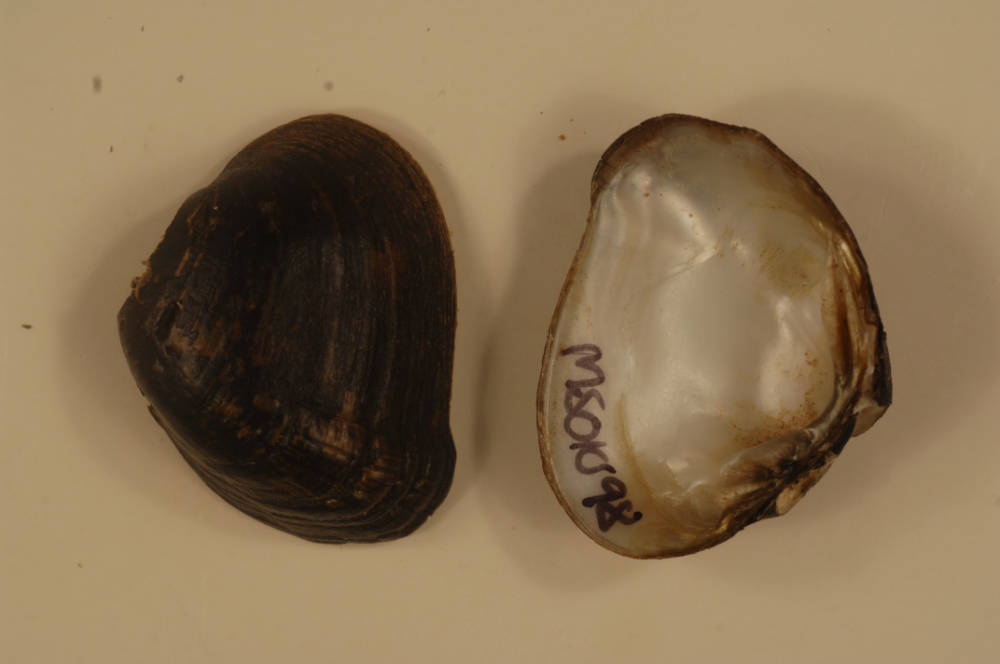

Conservation status
- Critically Endangered (IUCN 2.3)

- Critically Imperiled (NatureServe)

Scientific classification
- Kingdom: Animalia
- Phylum: Mollusca
- Class: Bivalvia
- Order: Unionida
- Family: Unionidae
- Genus: Epioblasma
- Species: E. penita

Binomial name
- Epioblasma penita (Conrad, 1834)

Synonyms
- Dysnomia penita Conrad, 1834

= Epioblasma penita =

Species of bivalve

Epioblasma penita, the southern combshell or penitent mussel, is a species of freshwater mussel, an aquatic bivalve mollusk in the family Unionidae, the river mussels.

This species is endemic to the United States. They have been spotted in the rivers of Alabama and Mississippi. It is threatened by habitat loss.

== Description ==
Adult southern combshells grow to be approximately 2.2 inches (5.6 cm) long, 1.6 inches (4.1 cm) high, and 1.4 inches (3.6 cm) wide. The shell of the mussel in a variety of colors including yellow, green, orange-brown, and black. It has a squarish shape with irregular growth lines and has a radially sculpted posterior. Its posterior ridge is flattened and broad. The inside of the shell is white and somewhat iridescent. Because the species is sexually dimorphic, female southern combshells have an expanded posterior shell.
