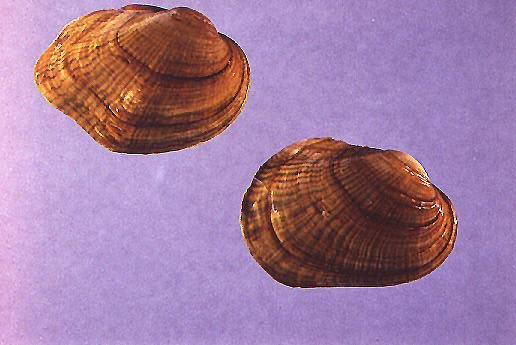
- Epioblasma torulosa rangiana

Conservation status
- Critically Endangered (IUCN 2.3)
- CITES Appendix II

Scientific classification
- Kingdom: Animalia
- Phylum: Mollusca
- Class: Bivalvia
- Order: Unionida
- Family: Unionidae
- Genus: Epioblasma
- Species: E. torulosa
- Subspecies: E. t. rangiana

Trinomial name
- Epioblasma torulosa rangiana (I. Lea, 1838)

= Northern riffleshell =

Subspecies of bivalve

The northern riffleshell (Epioblasma torulosa rangiana) is a subspecies of freshwater mussel, an aquatic bivalve mollusk in the family Unionidae, the river mussels. This mussel is endangered and federally protected. It was proposed as a species, Epioblasma rangiana, by Williams et al. (2017).

This mussel was formerly found widely in the Ohio River basin, but now the population is fragmented into only three viable groups.

This river mussel needs gravel river beds and swift-flowing, well-oxygenated water. The reduction in range seems to be principally due to impoundment, the silting up of rivers due to agriculture, mining and tree cutting and competition from zebra mussels.

== Distribution and conservation status ==
This mussel lives in Ontario, in Canada. It was classified as endangered by COSEWIC. The Canadian Species at Risk Act listed it in the List of Wildlife Species at Risk as being endangered in Canada.
