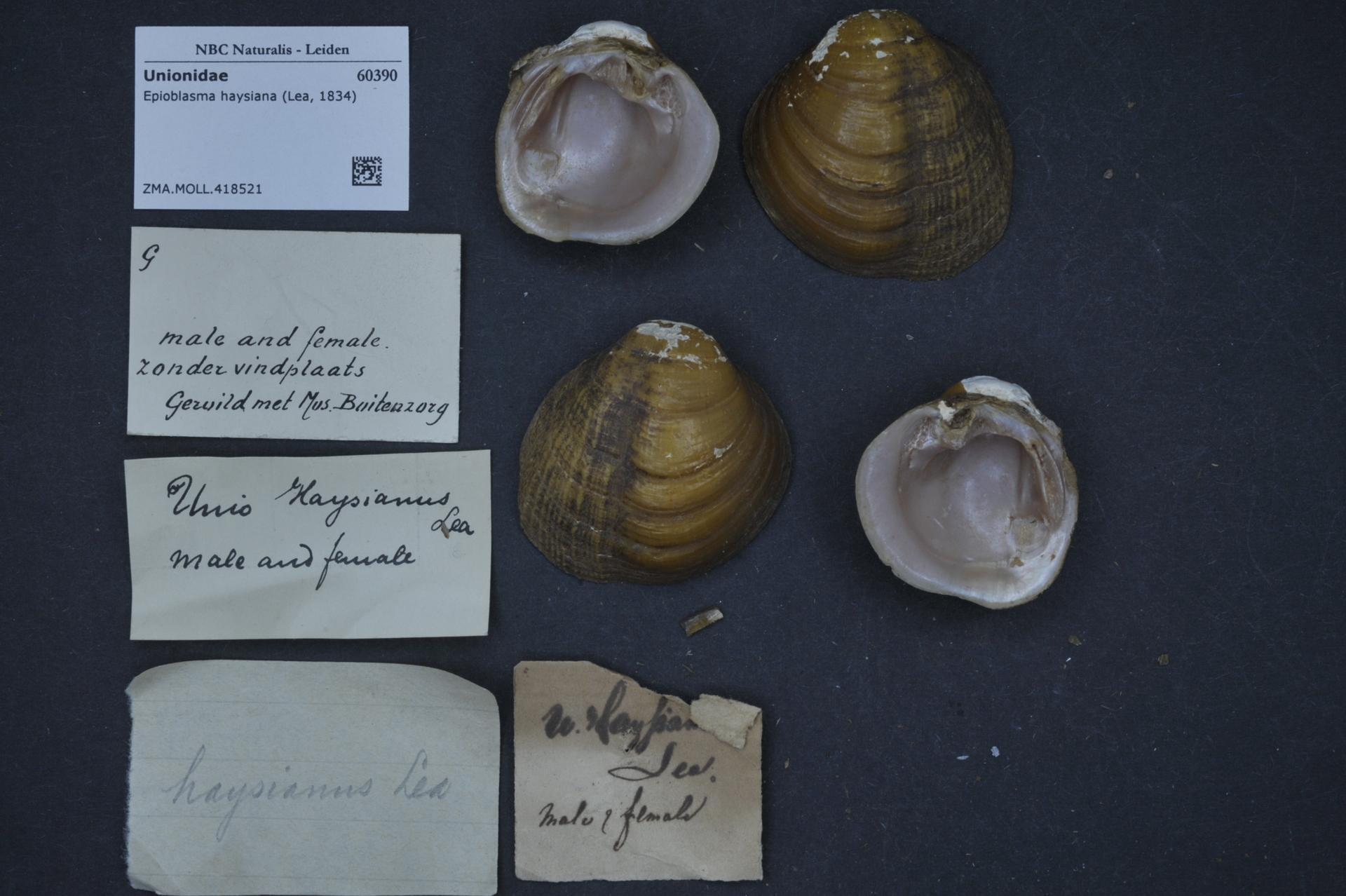

Conservation status
- Extinct (IUCN 2.3)

- Presumed Extinct (NatureServe)

Scientific classification
- Kingdom: Animalia
- Phylum: Mollusca
- Class: Bivalvia
- Order: Unionida
- Family: Unionidae
- Genus: Epioblasma
- Species: †E. haysiana

Binomial name
- †Epioblasma haysiana (I. Lea, 1834)

Synonyms
- Dysnomia haysiana I. Lea, 1834

= Epioblasma haysiana =

Species of bivalve

Epioblasma haysiana, the acornshell or acorn pearly mussel, was a species of freshwater mussel, an aquatic bivalve mollusk in the family Unionidae. It is now extinct.

This species was endemic to the drainages of the Cumberland River and the Tennessee River in the United States. Its natural habitat was riffle beds over gravel and sand. Like all other members of this sensitive genus, its population had severely declined to habitat destruction and pollution. The last remaining individuals were killed in the 1970s due to exposure to domestic sewage.
