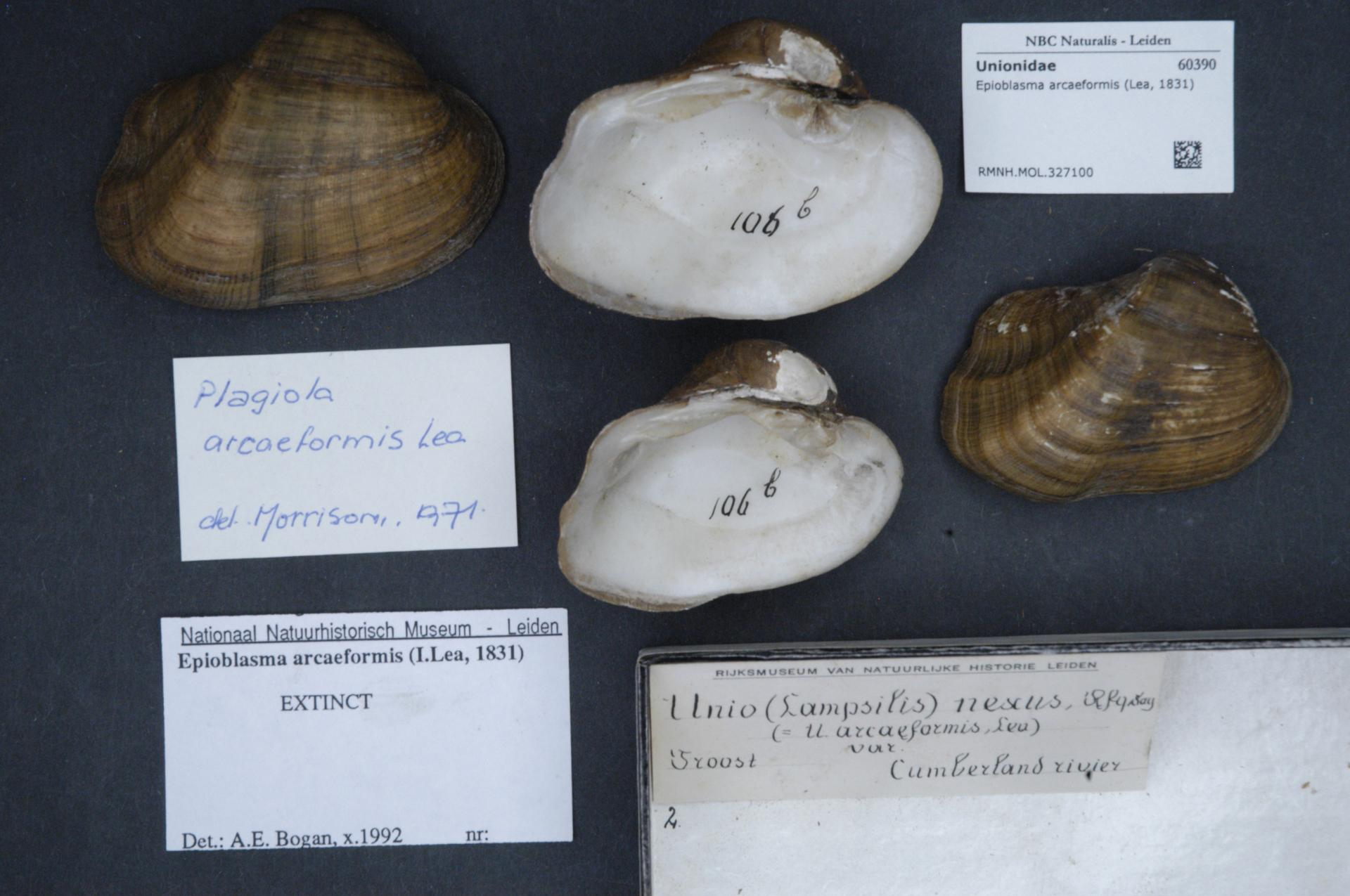

Conservation status
- Extinct (IUCN 2.3)

- Presumed Extinct (NatureServe)

Scientific classification
- Kingdom: Animalia
- Phylum: Mollusca
- Class: Bivalvia
- Order: Unionida
- Family: Unionidae
- Genus: Epioblasma
- Species: †E. arcaeformis

Binomial name
- †Epioblasma arcaeformis (I. Lea, 1831)

Synonyms
- Dysnomia arcaeformis I. Lea, 1831

= Epioblasma arcaeformis =

Species of bivalve

Epioblasma arcaeformis, the sugarspoon or arc-form pearly mussel, was a species of freshwater mussel, an aquatic bivalve mollusk in the family Unionidae, the river mussels. No live individuals have been observed since the early 20th century. The IUCN declared the arc-form pearly mussel to be extinct, publishing its new status on the 2000 Red List following an assessment in the same year.

This species was endemic to the drainages of the Cumberland River and the Tennessee River in the United States. Its natural habitat was rocky shoals of medium to large size rivers. Like most other members of its genus, it became extinct due to habitat loss from pollution, impoundment construction, and canalization. The Holston River, Tennessee contained the last known population, which was killed by the construction of Cherokee Dam in 1941.
