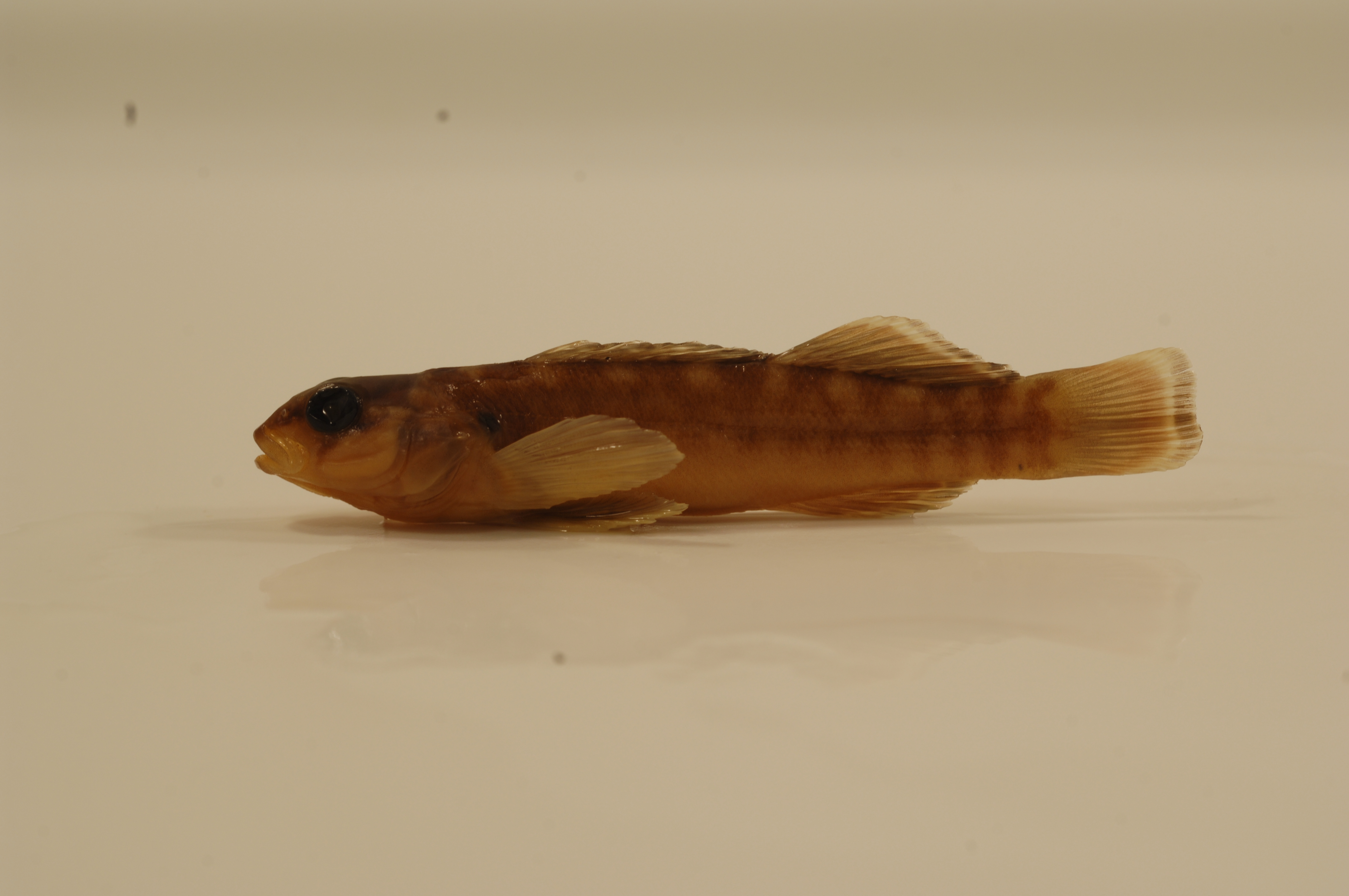

Conservation status
- Least Concern (IUCN 3.1)

Scientific classification
- Kingdom: Animalia
- Phylum: Chordata
- Class: Actinopterygii
- Order: Perciformes
- Family: Percidae
- Genus: Etheostoma
- Species: E. radiosum

Binomial name
- Etheostoma radiosum (Hubbs & J.D. Black, 1941)

Synonyms
- Poecilichthys whipplii radiosus Hubbs & Black, 1941; Poecilichthys radiosus cyanorum Moore & Rigney, 1952; Etheostoma radiosum cyanorum (Moore & Rigney, 1952)

= Orangebelly darter =

Species of fish

The orangebelly darter (Etheostoma radiosum) is a species of freshwater ray-finned fish, a darter from the subfamily Etheostomatinae, part of the family Percidae, which also contains the perches, ruffes and pikeperches. It is endemic to the eastern United States, where it occurs in the Ouachita and Red River drainages in southwestern Arkansas and southeastern Oklahoma. It occurs in gravel and rubble riffles and runs of creeks and small to medium rivers. This species can reach a length of 8.5 cm (3.3 in).
