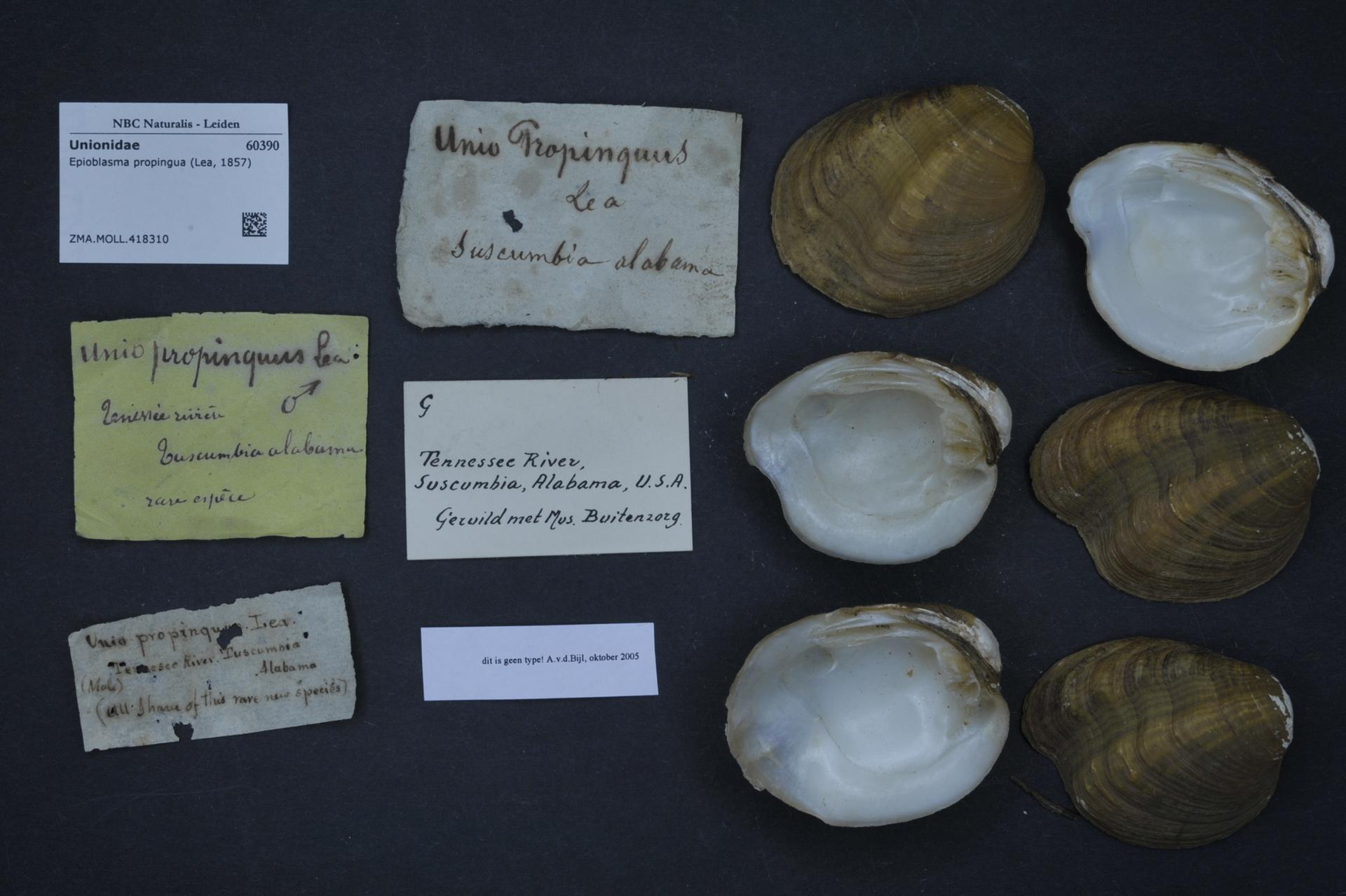

Conservation status
- Extinct (IUCN 3.1)

- Presumed Extinct (NatureServe)

Scientific classification
- Kingdom: Animalia
- Phylum: Mollusca
- Class: Bivalvia
- Order: Unionida
- Family: Unionidae
- Genus: Epioblasma
- Species: †E. propinqua

Binomial name
- †Epioblasma propinqua (I. Lea, 1857)

Synonyms
- Dysnomia propinqua I. Lea, 1857

= Epioblasma propinqua =

Species of bivalve

Epioblasma propinqua, the Tennessee riffleshell or nearby pearly mussel, is an extinct species of freshwater mussel in the family Unionidae. It was endemic to the United States, where it was found in the drainages of the Cumberland River, Ohio River, and Tennessee River.

Like most other members of its genus, it became extinct due to habitat loss in the form of dam construction, dredging, and pollution. This species was particularly sensitive to these effects, and appears to have declined greatly during early industrialization. The last live collection was made in 1901.
