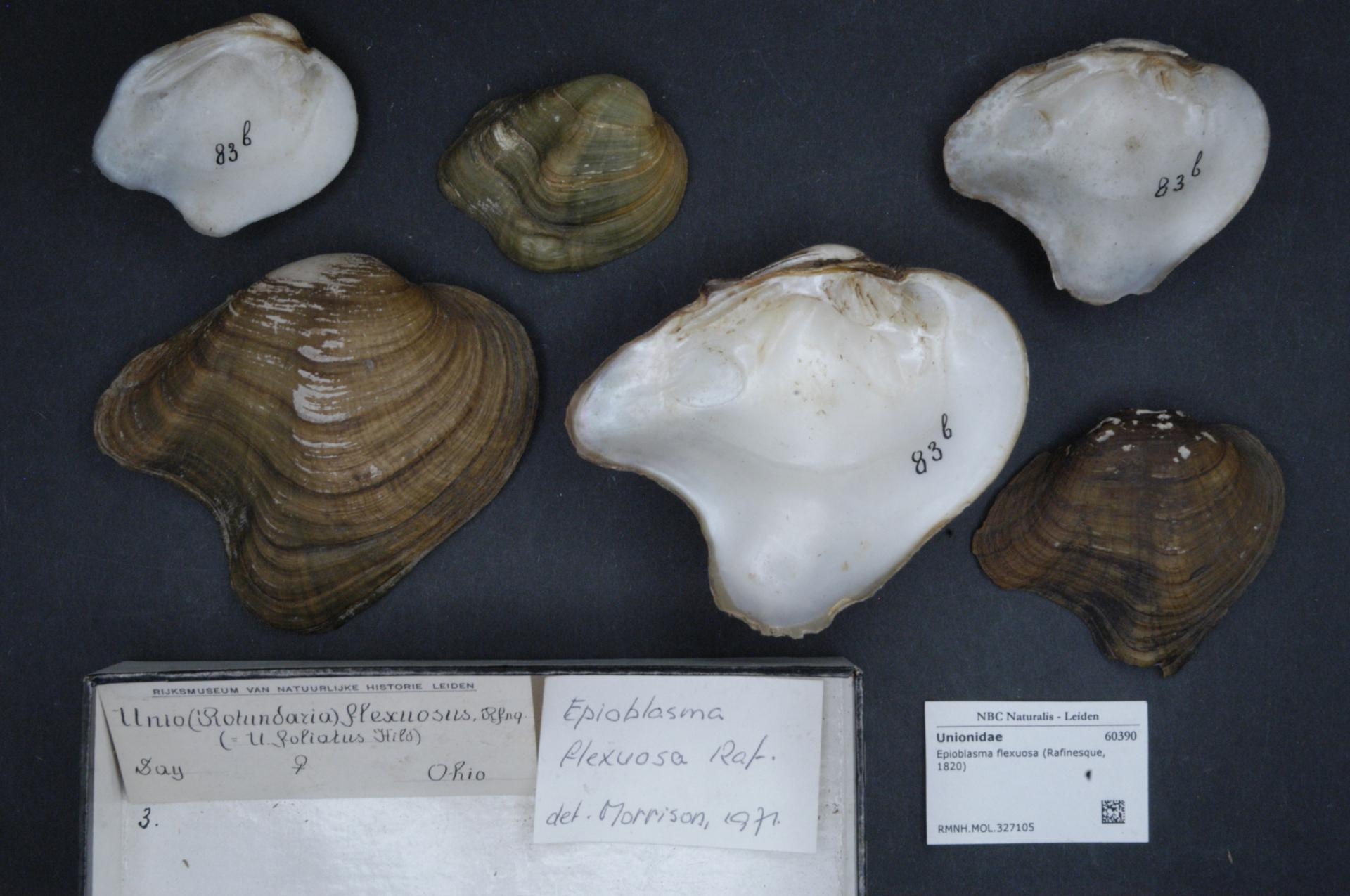

Conservation status
- Extinct (IUCN 2.3)

- Presumed Extinct (NatureServe)

Scientific classification
- Kingdom: Animalia
- Phylum: Mollusca
- Class: Bivalvia
- Order: Unionida
- Family: Unionidae
- Genus: Epioblasma
- Species: †E. flexuosa

Binomial name
- †Epioblasma flexuosa (Rafinesque, 1820)

Synonyms
- Dysnomia flexuosa Rafinesque, 1820

= Epioblasma flexuosa =

Species of bivalve

Epioblasma flexuosa, the arcuate pearly mussel or leafshell, was a species of freshwater mussel, an aquatic bivalve mollusk in the family Unionidae, the river mussels. This species was endemic to the United States, where it was found in the major drainages of the Ohio River, including the Cumberland, Tennessee, and Wabash Rivers. Its natural habitat was flowing water.

Like most other members of this sensitive genus, it became extinct early after industrialization due to habitat loss and pollution. The last living individual was seen in the year 1900.

It appears to be most closely related to Epioblasma lewisii, which is also now extinct.
