= List of fishes of Canada =

The following is a list of common fish species known to occur in the lakes and rivers of Canada.

This list does not include any fish that are exclusive to saltwater. Canada is bordered by three oceans - the Pacific, the Atlantic, and the Arctic. See also Government of Canada - Browse all Aquatic Species

== Order Petromyzontiformes (lampreys) ==
Family Petromyzontidae (northern lampreys)

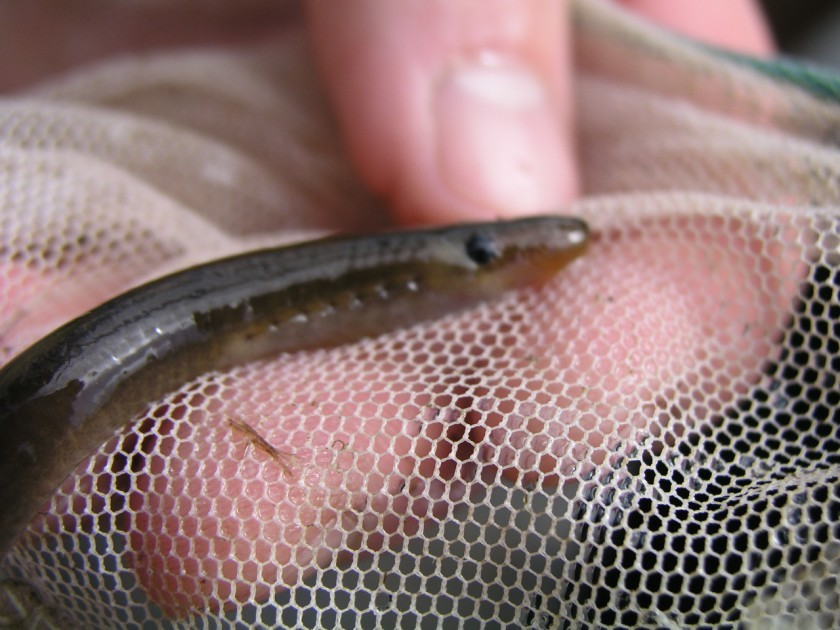
Western brook lamprey

- Vancouver lamprey (Entosphenus macrostoma)
- Pacific lamprey (Entosphenus tridentatus)
- Chestnut lamprey (Icthyomyzon castaneus)
- Northern brook lamprey (Icthyomyzon fossor)
- Silver lamprey (Icthyomyzon unicuspis)
- Western river lamprey (Lamptera ayresii)
- Western brook lamprey (Lamptera richardsoni)
- American brook lamprey (Lethenteron appendix)
- Arctic lamprey (Lethenteron camtschaticum)

== Order Acipenseriformes (sturgeons and paddlefish) ==
Family Acipenseridae (sturgeons)

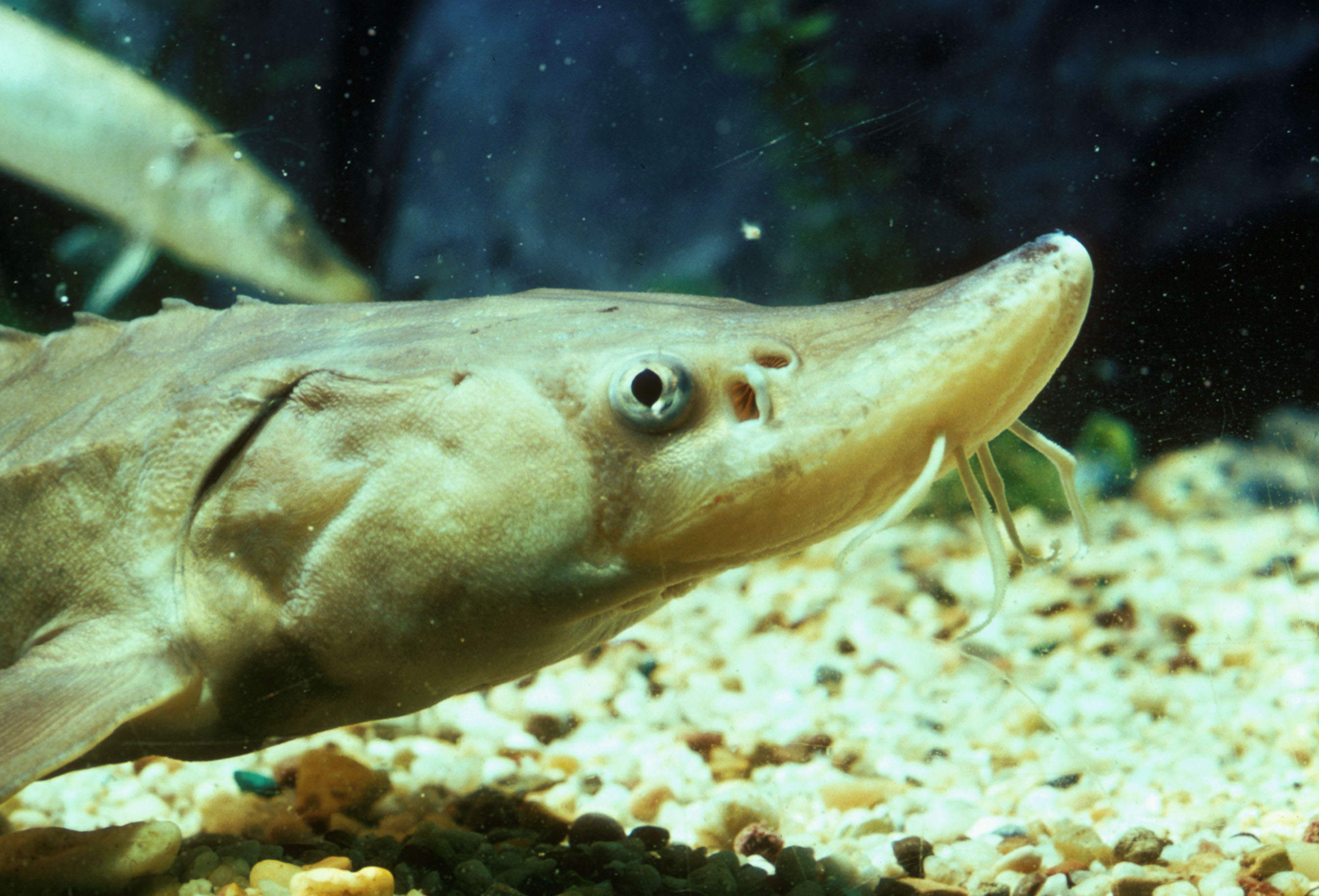
Lake sturgeon

- Shortnose sturgeon (Acipenser brevirostrum)
- Lake sturgeon (Acipenser fulvescens)
- Green sturgeon (Acipenser medirostris)
- Atlantic sturgeon (Acipenser oxyrinchus)
- White sturgeon (Acipenser transmontanus)

== Order Lepisosteiformes (gars) ==
Family Lepisosteidae (gars)

- Spotted gar (Lepisosteus oculatus)
- Longnose gar (Lepisosteus osseus)

== Order Amiiformes (Bowfins) ==
Family Amiidae (Bowfins)

- Eyetail bowfin (Amia ocellicauda)

== Order Hiodontiformes (mooneyes) ==
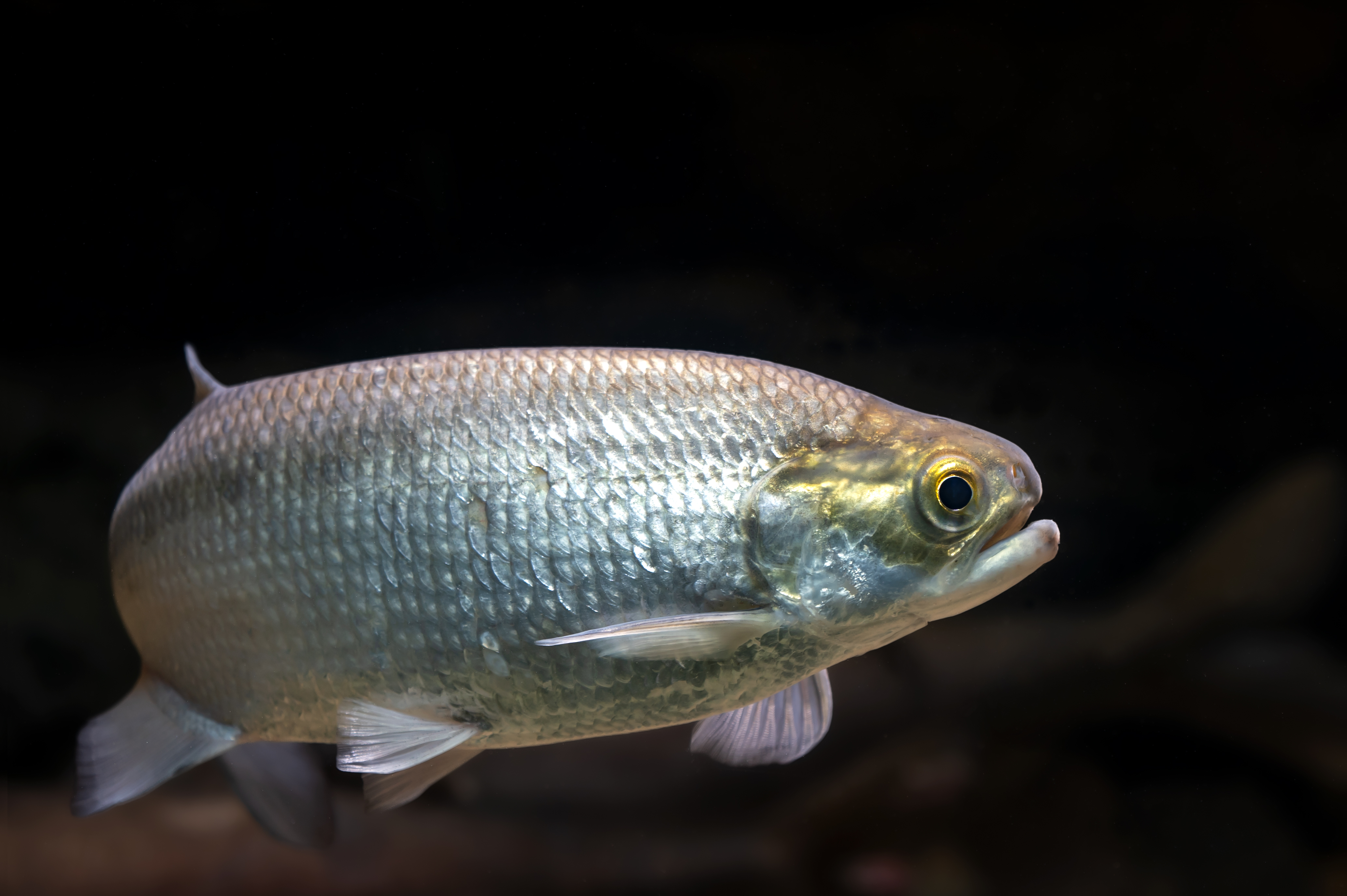
Goldeye

Family Hiodontidae (mooneyes)

- Goldeye (Hiodon alosoides)
- Mooneye (Hiodon tergisus)

== Order Anguilliformes (eels) ==
Family Anguillidae (freshwater eels)

- American eel (Anguilla rostrata)

== Order Clupeiformes (herrings and relatives) ==
Family Clupeidae (herrings, shads, and relatives)

- Blueback shad (Alosa aestivalis)
- Alewife (Alosa pseudoharengus)
- American shad (Alosa sapidissima)
- American gizzard shad (Dorosoma cepedianum)

== Order Cypriniformes (carps, minnows, and relatives) ==
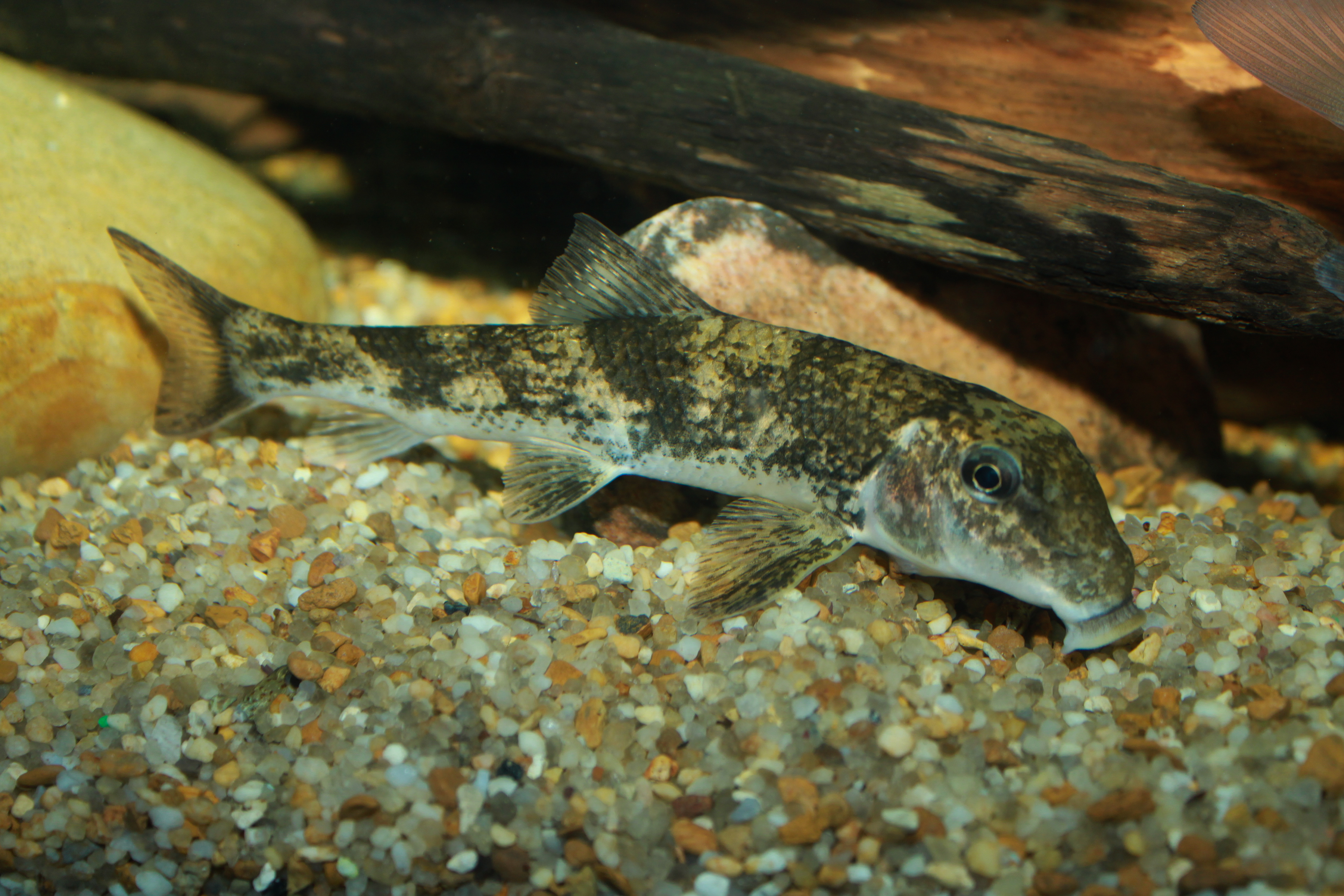
Northern hogsucker

Family Catostomidae (suckers)

- Longnose sucker (Catostomus catostomus)
- White sucker (Catostomus commersonii)
- Largescale sucker (Catostomus macrocheilus)
- Quillback (Carpiodes cyprinus)
- Lake chubsucker (Erimyzon sucetta)
- Northern hog sucker (Hypentelium nigricans)
- Bigmouth buffalo (Ictiobus cyprinellus)
- Black buffalo (Ictiobus niger)
- Spotted sucker (Minytrema melanops)
- Silver redhorse (Moxostoma anisurum)
- River redhorse (Moxostoma carinatum)
- Black redhorse (Moxostoma dubuquesnei)
- Golden redhorse (Moxostoma erythurum)
- Copper redhorse (Moxostoma hubbsi)
- Shorthead redhorse (Moxostoma macrolepidotum)
- Greater redhorse (Moxostoma valenciennesi)
- Plains sucker (Pantosteus jordani)

Family Cobitidae (True loaches)

- Oriental weatherfish (Misgurnus anguillicaudatus) (I)

Family Cyprinidae (Cyprinids)

- Goldfish (Carassius auratus) (I)
- Prussian carp (Carassius gibelio) (I)
- European carp (Cyprinus carpio) (I)
- Amur carp (Cyprinus rubrofuscus) (I)

Family Leuciscidae (True minnow)

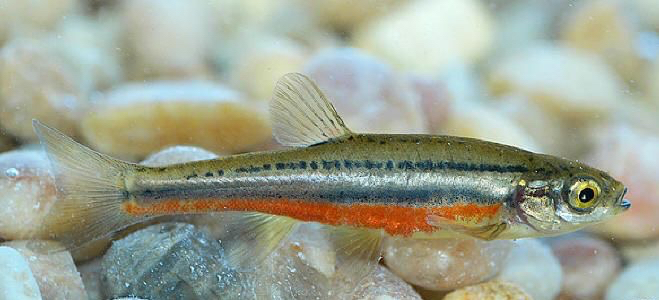
Northern redbelly dace

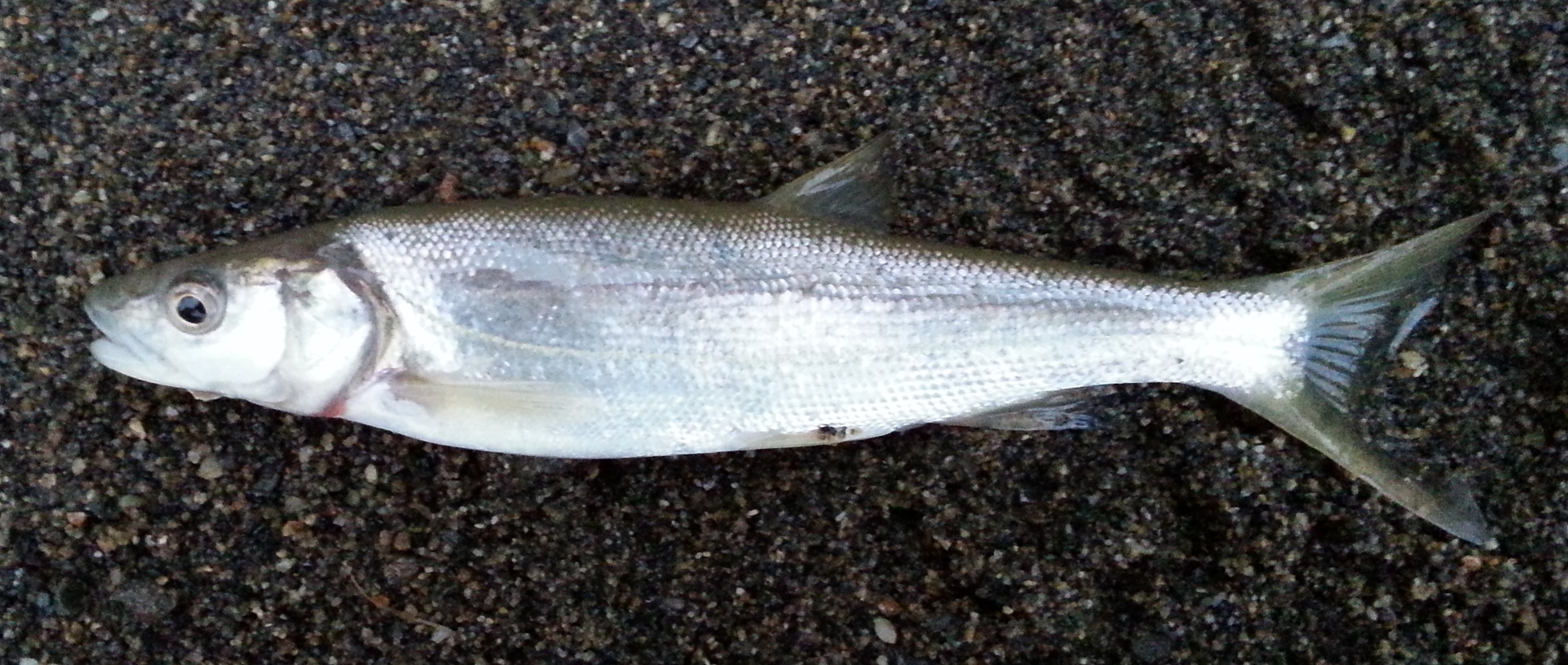
Northern pikeminnow

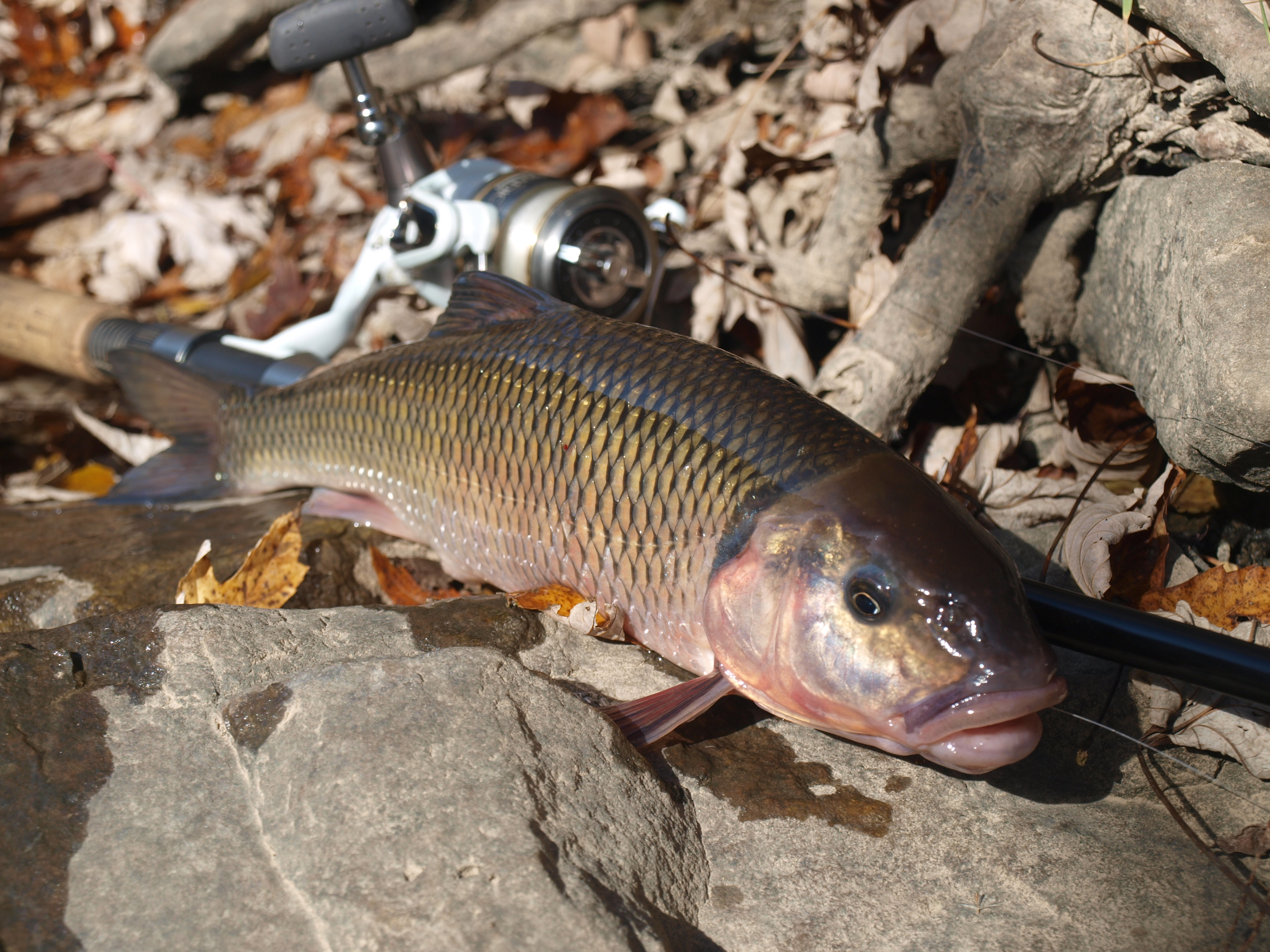
Fallfish

- Central stoneroller (Campostoma anomalum)
- Northern redbelly dace (Chrosomus eos)
- Finescale dace (Chrosomus neogaeus)
- Redside dace (Clinostomus elongatus)
- Lake chub (Couesius plumbeus)
- Spotfin shiner (Cyprinella spiloptera)
- Cutlip minnow (Exoglossum maxillingua)
- Chiselmouth (Gila alutacea)
- Brassy minnow (Hybognathus hankisoni)
- Eastern silvery minnow (Hybognathus regius)
- Striped shiner (Luxilus chrysocephalus)
- Common shiner (Luxilus cornutus)
- Redfin shiner (Lythrurus umbratilis)
- Silver chub (Macrhybopsis storeriana)
- Northern pearl dace (Margariscus nachtriebi)
- Peamouth (Mylocheilus caurinus)
- Hornyhead chub (Nocomis biguttatus)
- River chub (Nocomis micropogon)
- Golden shiner (Notemigonus crysoleucas)
- Pugnose shiner (Notropis anogenus)
- Emerald shiner (Notropis atherinoides)
- Bridle shiner (Notropis bifrenatus)
- River shiner (Notropis blennius)
- Ghost shiner (Notropis buchanani)
- Bigmouth shiner (Notropis dorsalis)
- Blackchin shiner (Notropis heterodon)
- Blacknose shiner (Notropis heterolepis)
- Spottail shiner (Notropis hudsonius)
- Silver shiner (Notropis photogenis)
- Rosyface shiner (Notropis rubellus)
- Sand shiner (Notropis stramineus)
- Mimic shiner (Notropis volucellus)
- Bluntnose minnow (Pimephales notatus)
- Fathead minnow (Pimephales promelas)
- Flathead chub (Platygobio gracilis)
- Northern pikeminnow (Ptychocheilus oregonensis)
- Eastern blacknose dace (Rhinichthys atratulus)
- Longnose dace (Rhinichthys cataractae)
- Leopard dace (Rhinichthys falcatus)
- Western blacknose dace (Rhinichthys obtusus)
- Speckled dace (Rhinichthys osculus)
- Umatilla dace (Rhinichthys umatilla)
- Redside shiner (Richardsonius balteatus)
- Rudd (Scardinius erythrophthalmus) (I)
- Creek chub (Semotilus atromaculatus)
- Fallfish (Semotilus corporalis)

Family Tincidae (Tenches)

- Tench (Tinca tinca) (I)

== Order Siluriformes (Catfishes) ==
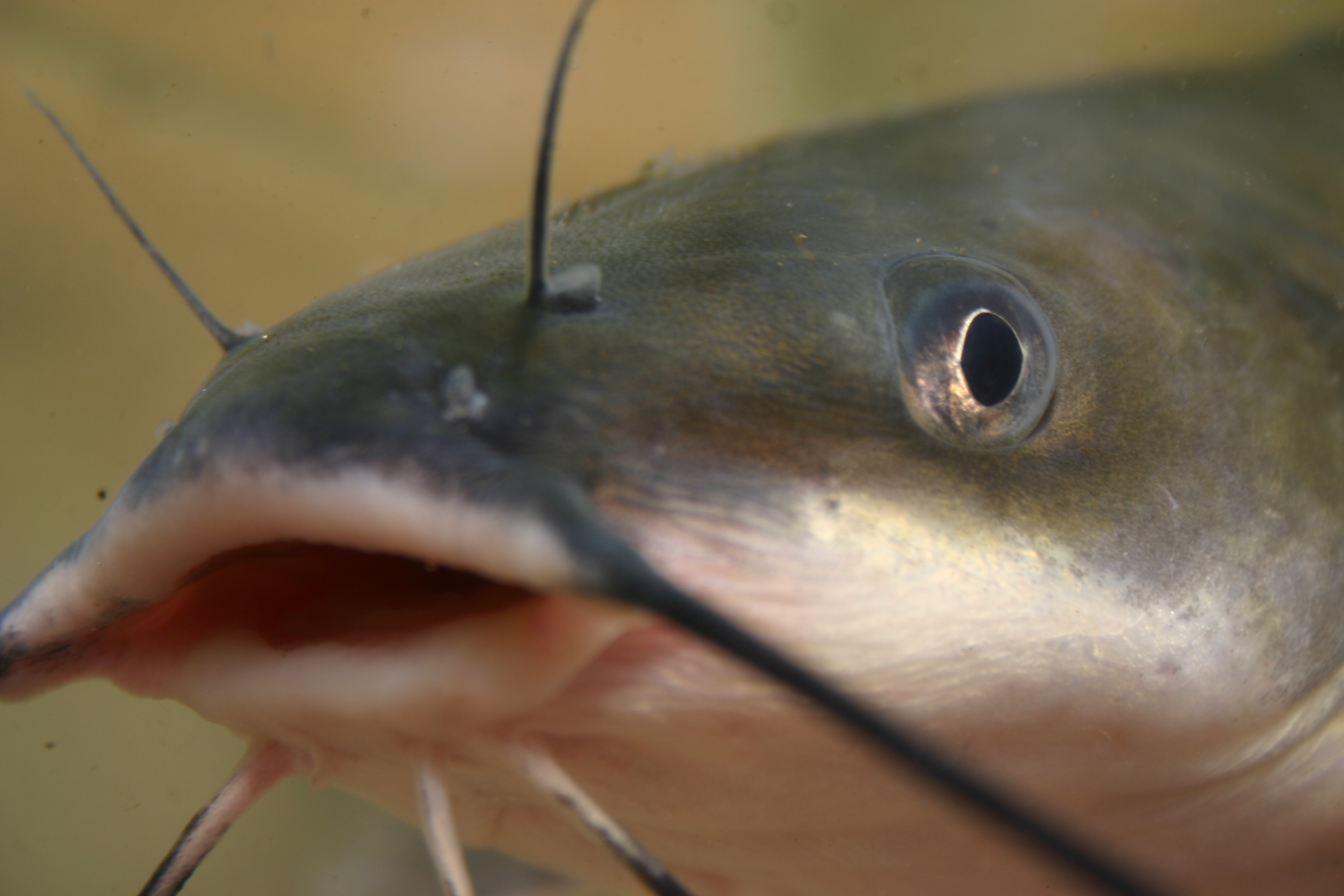
Channel catfish

Family Ictaluridae (Freshwater catfishes)

- Black bullhead (Ameiurus melas)
- Yellow bullhead (Ameiurus natalis)
- Brown bullhead (Ameiurus nebulosus)
- Channel catfish (Ictalurus punctatus)
- Stonecat (Noturus flavus)
- Tadpole madtom (Noturus gyrinus)
- Margined madtom (Noturus insignis)
- Brindled madtom (Noturus miurus)

== Order Esociformes (Pikes and mudminnows) ==
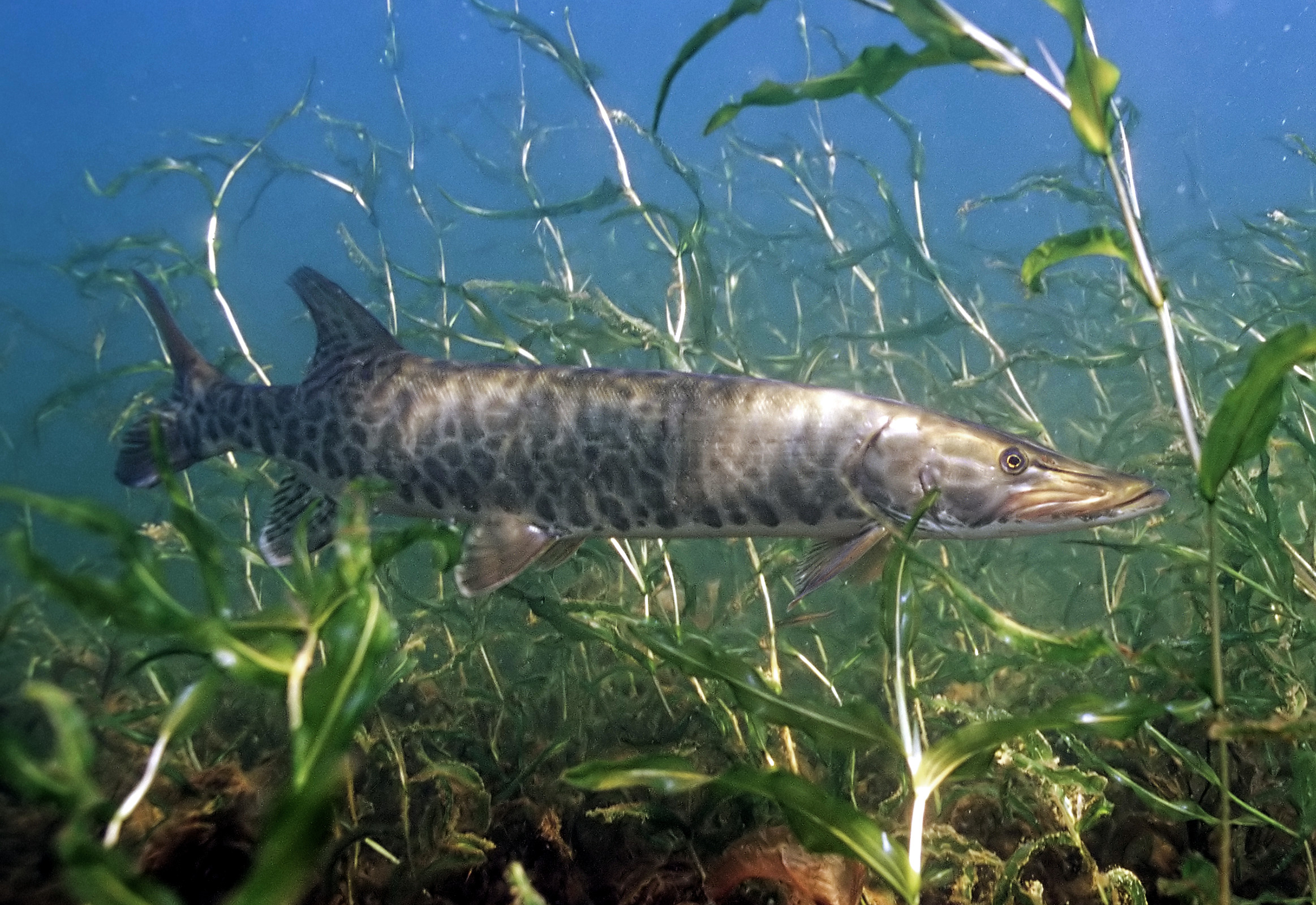
Muskellunge

Family Esocidae (Pikes)

- American pickerel (Esox americanus)
- Northern pike (Esox lucius)
- Muskellunge (Esox masquinongy)
- Chain pickerel (Esox niger)

Family Umbridae (Mudminnows)

- Central mudminnow (Umbra limi)

== Order Salmoniformes (Salmon, trout, and whitefish) ==
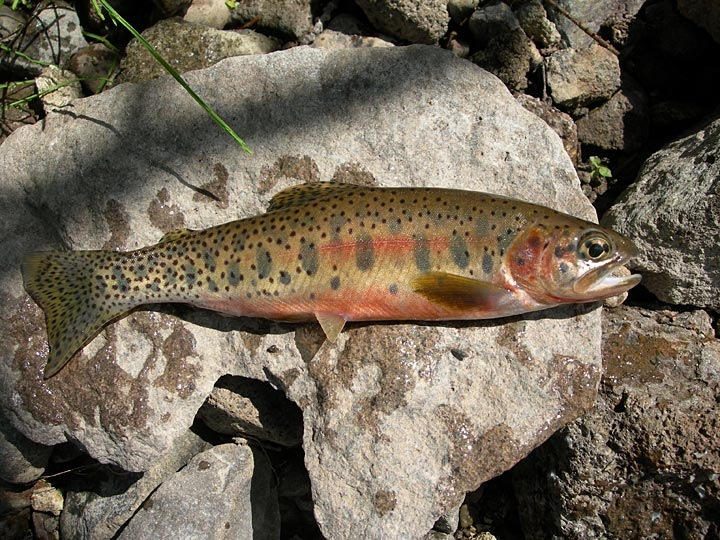
Cutthroat trout

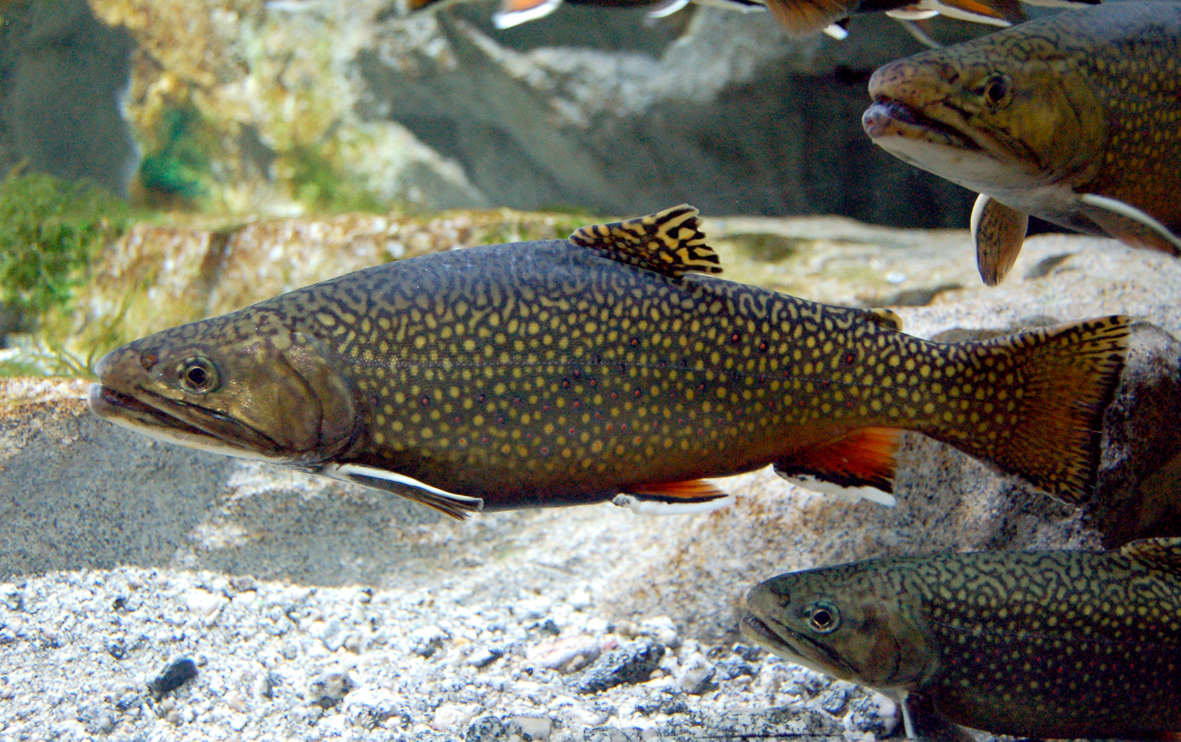
Brook trout

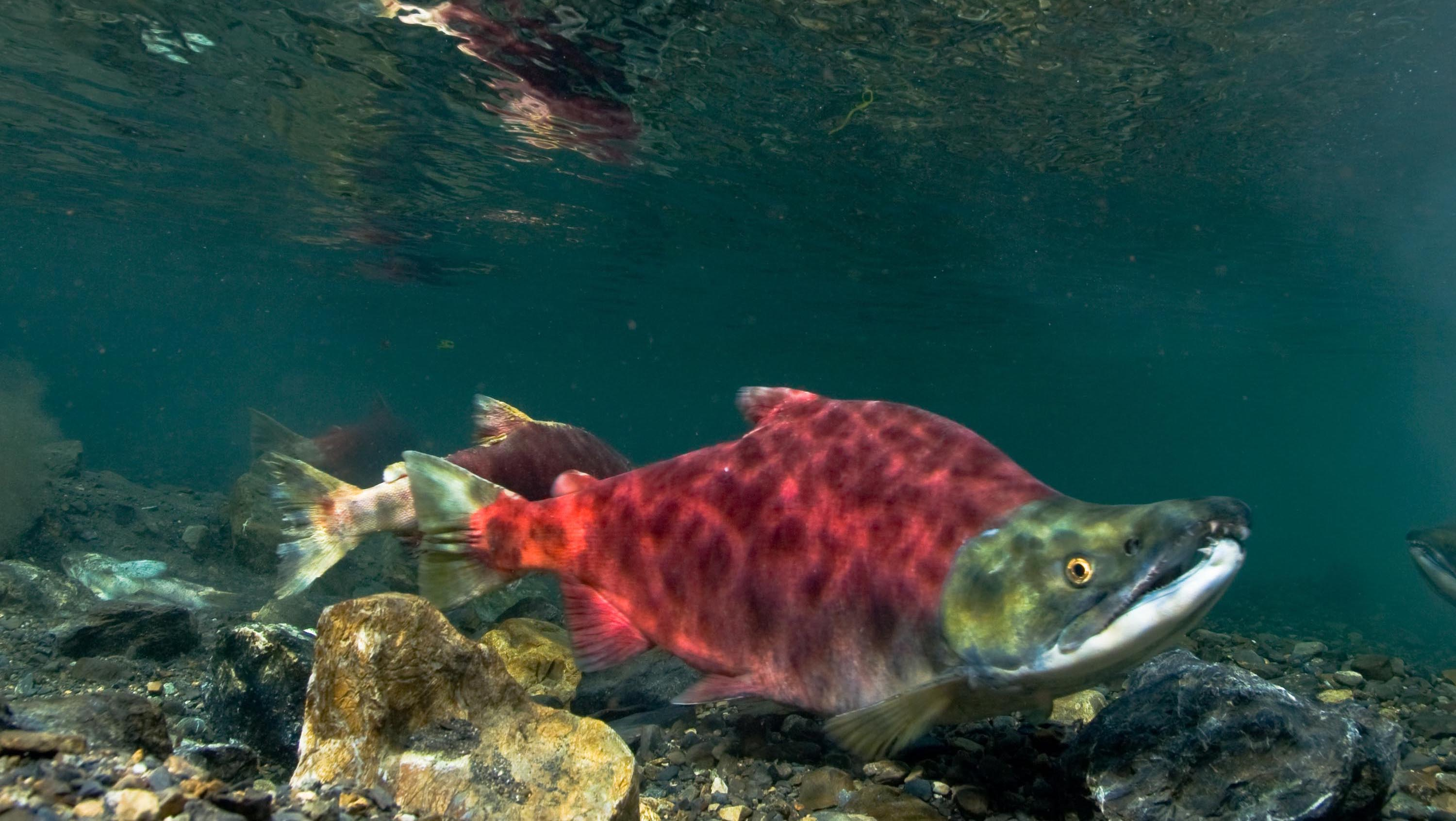
Sockeye salmon

Family Salmonidae (Salmon, trout, and whitefish)

- Least cisco (Coregonus albula)
- Cisco (Coregonus artedi)
- Arctic cisco (Coregonus autumnalis)
- Lake whitefish (Coregonus clupeaformis)
- Bloater (Coregonus hoyi)
- Atlantic whitefish (Coregonus huntsmani)
- Broad whitefish (Coregonus nasus)
- Shortjaw cisco (Coregonus zenithicus)
- Golden trout (Oncorhynchus aguabonita) (I)
- Cutthroat trout (Oncorhynchus clarkii)
- Pink salmon (Oncorhynchus gorbuscha)
- Chum salmon (Oncorhynchus keta)
- Coho salmon (Oncorhynchus kisutch)
- Rainbow trout (Oncorhynchus mykiss)
- Sockeye salmon (Oncorhynchus nerka)
- Chinook salmon (Oncorhynchus tshawytscha)
- Pygmy whitefish (Prosopium coulterii)
- Round whitefish (Prosopium cylindraceum)
- Mountain whitefish (Prosopium williamsoni)
- Atlantic salmon (Salmo salar)
- Brown trout (Salmo trutta)
- Arctic char (Salvelinus alpinus)
- Bull trout (Salvelinus confluentus)
- Brook trout (Salvelinus fontinalis)
- Dolly varden (Salvelinus malma)
- Lake trout (Salvelinus namaycush)
- Nelma (Stenodus nelma)
- Arctic grayling (Thymallus arcticus)

== Order Percopsiformes (Trout-perches) ==
Family Percopsidae (Trout-perch)

- Trout-perch (Percopsis omiscomaycus)

== Order Cichliformes (Cichilids) ==
Family Cichlidae (Cichilids)

- Jewelfish (Rubricatochromis bimaculatus) (I) (Ex)

== Order Cyprinodontiformes (Toothcarps) ==
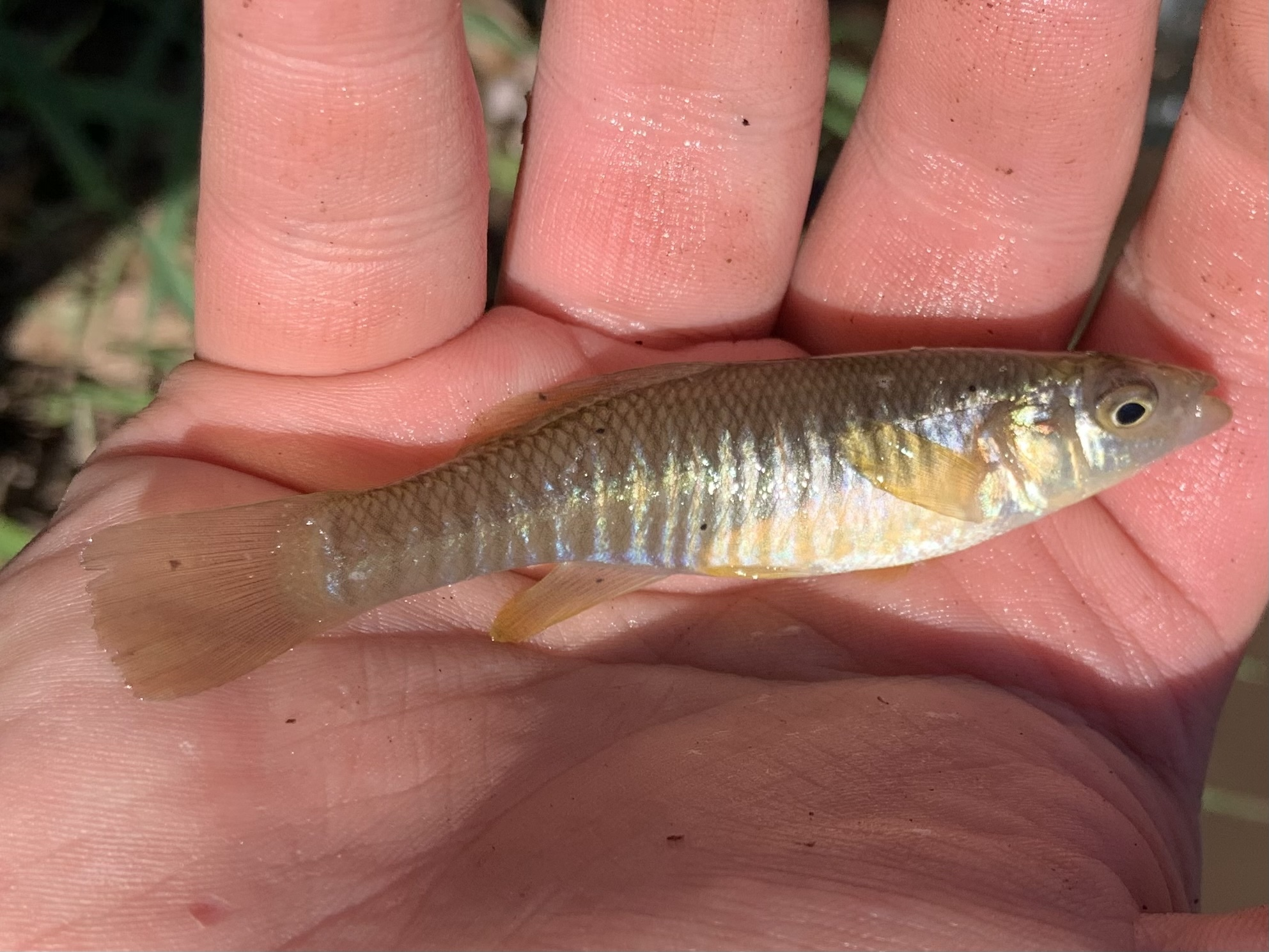
Mummichog

Family Fundulidae (Topminnows)

- Banded killifish (Fundulus diaphanus)
- Mummichog (Fundulus heteroclitus)
- Blackstripe topminnow (Fundulus notatus)

Family Poeciliidae (Livebearers)

- Western mosquitofish (Gambusia affinis) (I)
- Sailfin molly (Poecilia latipinna) (I)

== Order Atheriniformes (Silversides) ==
Family Atherinopsidae (Neotropical silversides)

- Brook silverside (Labidesthes sicculus)
- Atlantic silverside (Menidia menidia)

== Order Gasterosteiformes (Sticklebacks) ==
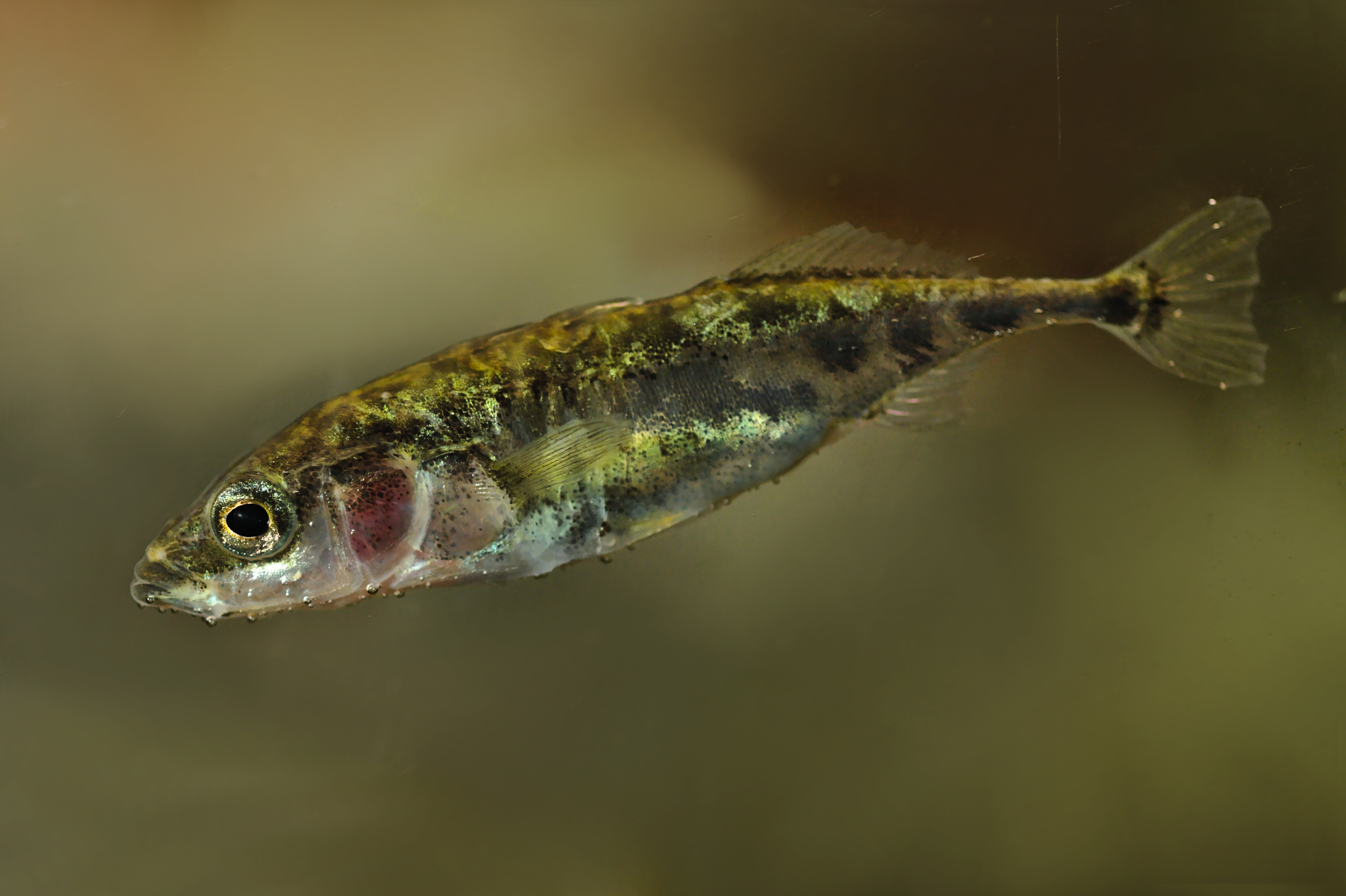
Threespine stickleback

Family Gasterosteidae (Sticklebacks)

- Fourspine stickleback (Apeltes quadracus)
- Brook stickleback (Culaea inconstans)
- Threespine stickleback (Gasterosteus aculeatus)
- Blackspotted stickleback (Gasterosteus wheatlandi)

== Order Scorpaeniformes (Mail-cheeked fishes) ==
Family Cottidae (Sculpins)

- Coastrange sculpin (Cottus aleuticus)
- Prickly sculpin (Cottus asper)
- Mottled sculpin (Cottus bairdii)
- Slimy sculpin (Cottus cognatus)
- Columbia sculpin (Cottus hubbsi)
- Torrent sculpin (Cottus rhotheus)
- Spoonhead sculpin (Cottus ricei)
- Deepwater sculpin (Myoxocephalus thompsonii)

== Order Perciformes (Sunfish and perch) ==
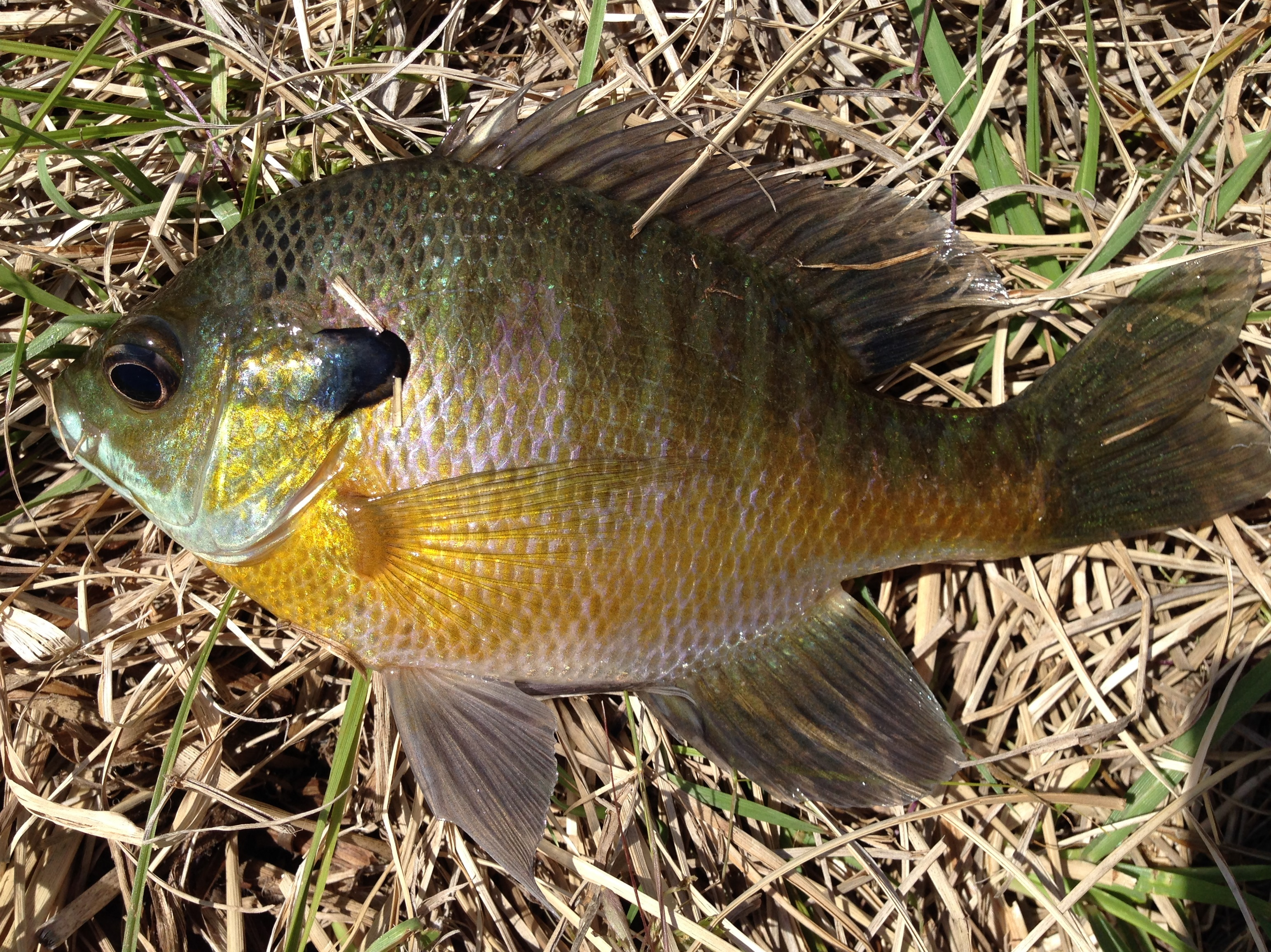
Bluegill

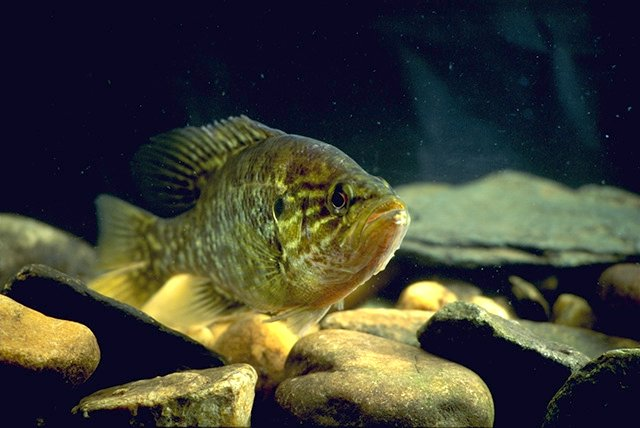
Warmouth

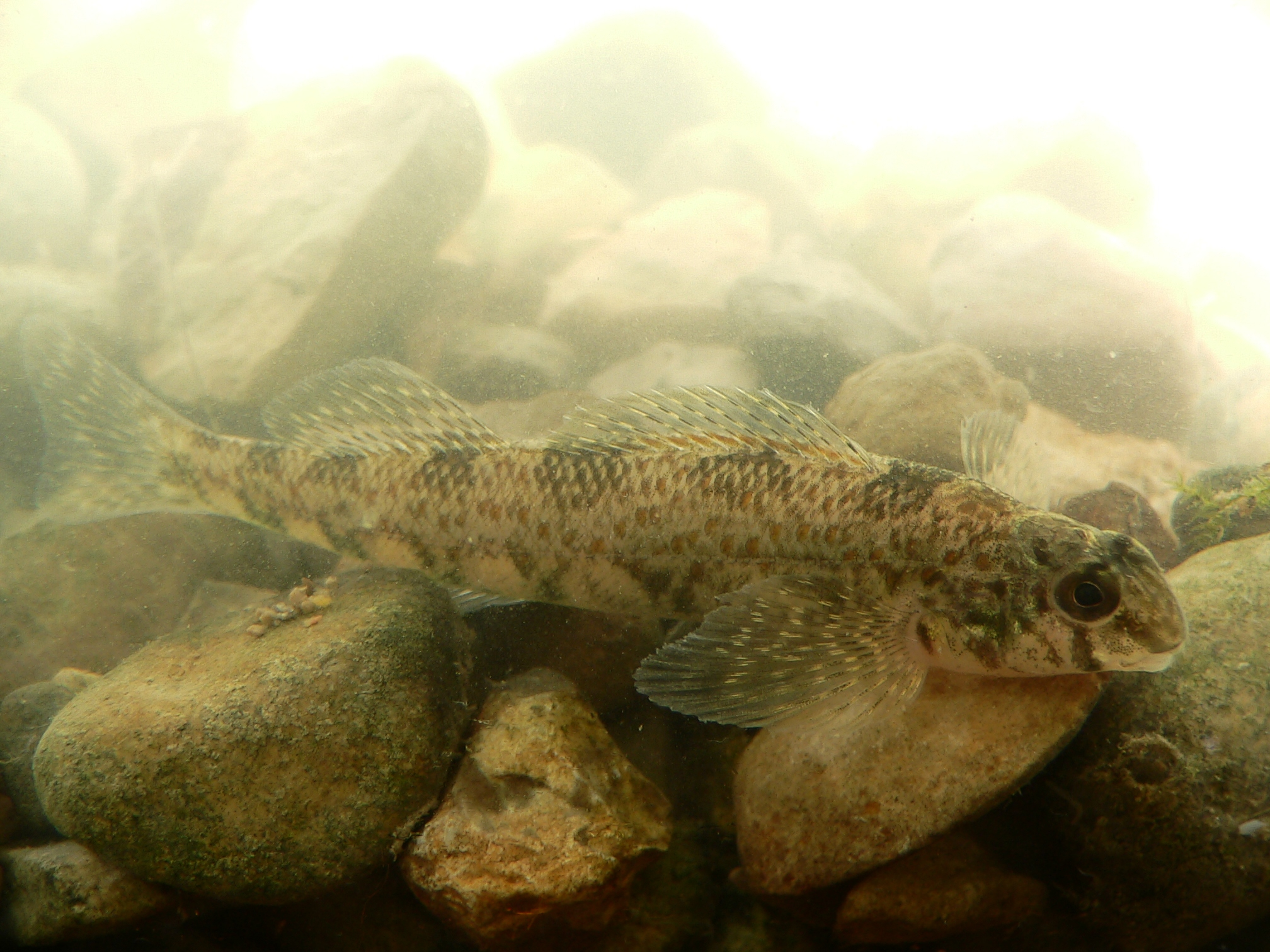
Greenside darter

Family Moronidae (Temperate basses)

- White perch (Morone americana)
- White bass (Morone chrysops)
- Striped bass (Morone saxitilis)

Family Centrarchidae (Sunfishes)

- Rock bass (Ambioplites rupestris)
- Redbreast sunfish (Lepomis auritus)
- Green sunfish (Lepomis cyanellus)
- Pumpkinseed (Lepomis gibbosus)
- Warmouth (Lepomis gulosus)
- Orangespotted sunfish (Lepomis humilis) (I)
- Bluegill (Lepomis macrochirus)
- Northern sunfish (Lepomis peltastes)
- Smallmouth bass (Micropterus dolomieu)
- Largemouth bass (Micropterus salmoides)
- White crappie (Pomoxis annularis)
- Black crappie (Pomoxis nigromaculatus)

Family Percidae (Perches, darters, and allies)

- Eastern sand darter (Ammocrypta pellucida)
- Tessellated darter (Etheostoma almstedi)
- Greenside darter (Etheostoma blennioides)
- Rainbow darter (Etheostoma caeruleum)
- Iowa darter (Etheostoma exile)
- Fantail darter (Etheostoma flabellare)
- Least darter (Etheostoma microperca)
- Johnny darter (Etheostoma nigrum)
- Ruffe (Gymnocephalus cernua)
- Yellow perch (Perca flavescens)
- Common logperch (Percina caprodes)
- Channel darter (Percina copelandi)
- Blackside darter (Percina maculata)
- Sauger (Sander canadensis)

Family Sciaenidae (drums)

- Freshwater drum (Aplodinotus grunniens)
