= Santa Ana speckled dace =

Conservation status
- Critically Imperiled (NatureServe)

Scientific classification
- Kingdom: Animalia
- Phylum: Chordata
- Class: Actinopterygii
- Division: Teleostei
- Order: Cypriniformes
- Family: Leuciscidae
- Genus: Rhinichthys
- Species: R. gabrielino

Binomial name
- Rhinichthys gabrielino Moyle, Buckmaster & Su, 2023

Species of fish

The Santa Ana speckled dace (Rhinichthys gabrielino) is a species of freshwater ray-finned fish belonging to the family Leuciscidae, the shiners, daces and minnows. This species is found in California.

== Taxonomy ==
The Santa Ana speckled dace was first formally described in 2023 by Peter B. Moyle, Nicholas Buckmaster and Yingxin Su with its type locality given as the East Fork of the San Gabriel River, south of Upper Monroe Road, Angeles National Forest, Los Angeles County, California at 34°14'15.85"N, 117°49'14.58"W. It was formerly considered to be a population of the speckled dace (R. osculus) but Moyle, Buckmaster and Su found that this taxon had a number of separate evolutionary lineages in California. This species belongs to the subfamily Pogonichthyinae within the family Leuciscidae in the order Cypriniformes.

== Etymology ==
The Santa Ana speckled dace belongs to the genus Rhinichthys, a name which combines rhinos, meaning "nose", and ichthys, meaning "fish". This refers to the obvious snout of the type species of the genus, the Eastern blacknose dace (R. atratulus). The specific name honors the indigenous Gabrielino-Tongva people who lived in the area encompassing the range of this species.

== Description ==
The Santa Ana speckled dace is a small fish which is typically less than 8 cm (3.1 in), exceptionally they may reach 11 cm (4.3 in). There is a single barbel at the tip of each jaw and a flap of skin which connects the snout to the upper lip. The upper body and flanks are dusky yellow or olive marked with dark speckling and mottling. The bases of the fins are red in both males and females in the spawning seasons, with the males frequently developing a red snout and lips. There are between 6 and 9 rays in the dorsal fin and between 6 and 8 in the anal fin. This species is morphologically practically indistinguishable from the speckled dace.

== Distribution ==
The Santa Ana speckled dace is endemic to Southern California where it formerly occurred in the Los Angeles, San Gabriel, San Jacinto and Santa Ana Rivers, but it is now restricted to the upper basins of the Santa Ana, San Jacinto, and San Gabriel rivers, as well as in Big Tujunga Creek, which is part of the Los Angeles River drainage. They have been introduced into the Santa Clara River and Cuyama River, and into River Springs in Mono County, but only the Santa Clara River population has persisted.
