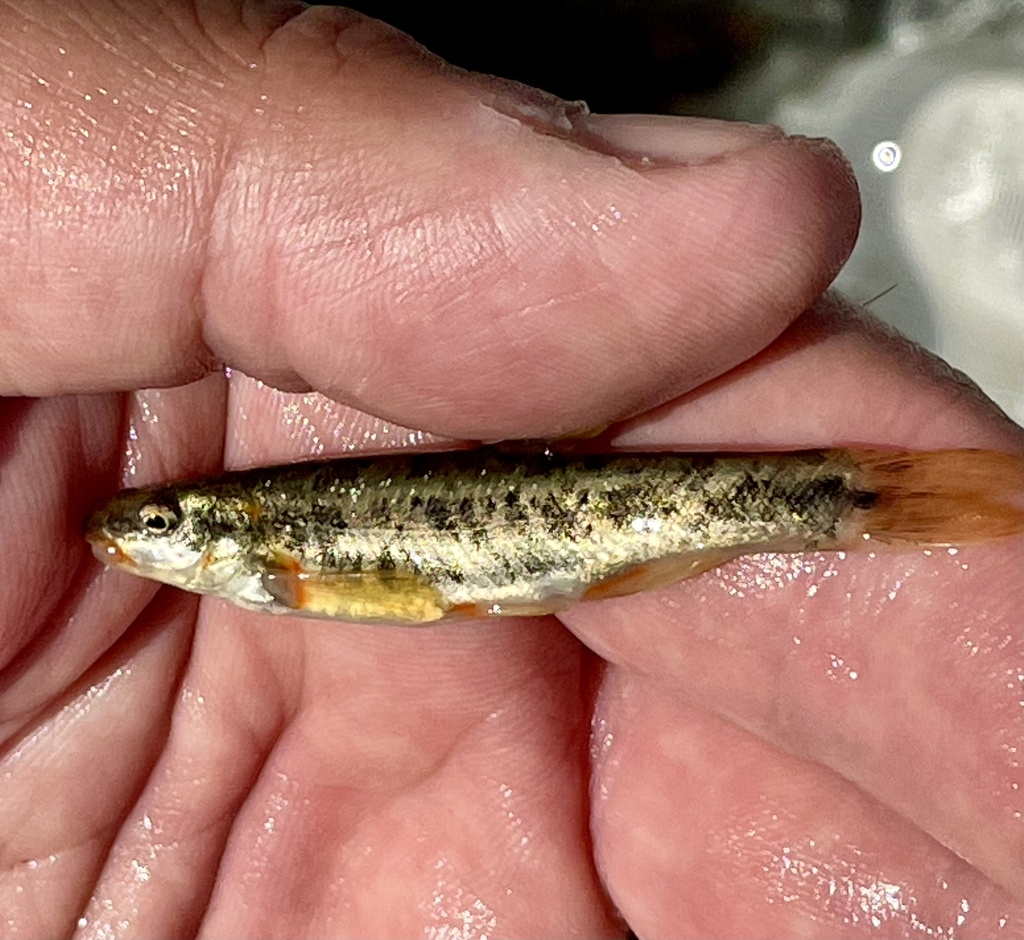

Scientific classification
- Kingdom: Animalia
- Phylum: Chordata
- Class: Actinopterygii
- Division: Teleostei
- Order: Cypriniformes
- Family: Leuciscidae
- Genus: Rhinichthys
- Species: R. klamathensis

Binomial name
- Rhinichthys klamathensis (Evermann & Meek, 1898)

Synonyms
- Agosia klamathensis Evermann & Meek, 1898; Rhinichthys klamathensis achomawi Moyle, Buckmaster & Su, 2023; Rhinichthys klamathensis goyatoka Moyle, Buckmaster & Su, 2023

= Western speckled dace =

Species of fish

The Western speckled dace (Rhinichthys klamathensis) is a species of freshwater ray-finned fish belonging to the family Leuciscidae, the shiners, daces and minnows. This species is found in the Klamath, Warner and Sacramento drainage systems in California and Oregon, and speckled dace in the Chewaucan River, Surprise Valley, and Wall Canyon Creek may also belong to this species. This species was first formally described in 1898 by the American ichthyologists Barton Warren Evermann and Seth Eugene Meek with the type locality given as the mouth of a creek in Pelican Bay, Upper Klamath Lake, Klamath County, Oregon. This taxon was previously regarded as a subspecies of the speckled dace (R. osculus) but in 2023 Peter B. Moyle, Nicholas Buckmaster and Yingxin Su confirmed it was a valid species with three subspecies, the Klamath speckled dace (R. k. klamathensis), Sacramento speckled dace (R. k. achomawi) and Warner speckled dace (R. k. goyatoka).
