= Grass Valley speckled dace =

Conservation status
- Presumed Extinct (NatureServe)

Scientific classification
- Kingdom: Animalia
- Phylum: Chordata
- Class: Actinopterygii
- Order: Cypriniformes
- Family: Leuciscidae
- Genus: Rhinichthys
- Species: R. osculus
- Subspecies: †R. o. reliquus

Trinomial name
- †Rhinichthys osculus reliquus Hubbs & Miller, 1972

Subspecies of fish

The Grass Valley speckled dace (Rhinichthys osculus reliquus) is an extinct subspecies of fish that occurred in a single spring-fed creek in a grassy meadow in eastern Lander County, Nevada. Specimens were collected only once in 1938, and it was then considered common. The species had a distinctive speckled lower lip and silver sided body. The introduction of brook and rainbow trout to the creek is believed to be the reason for their extinction.
