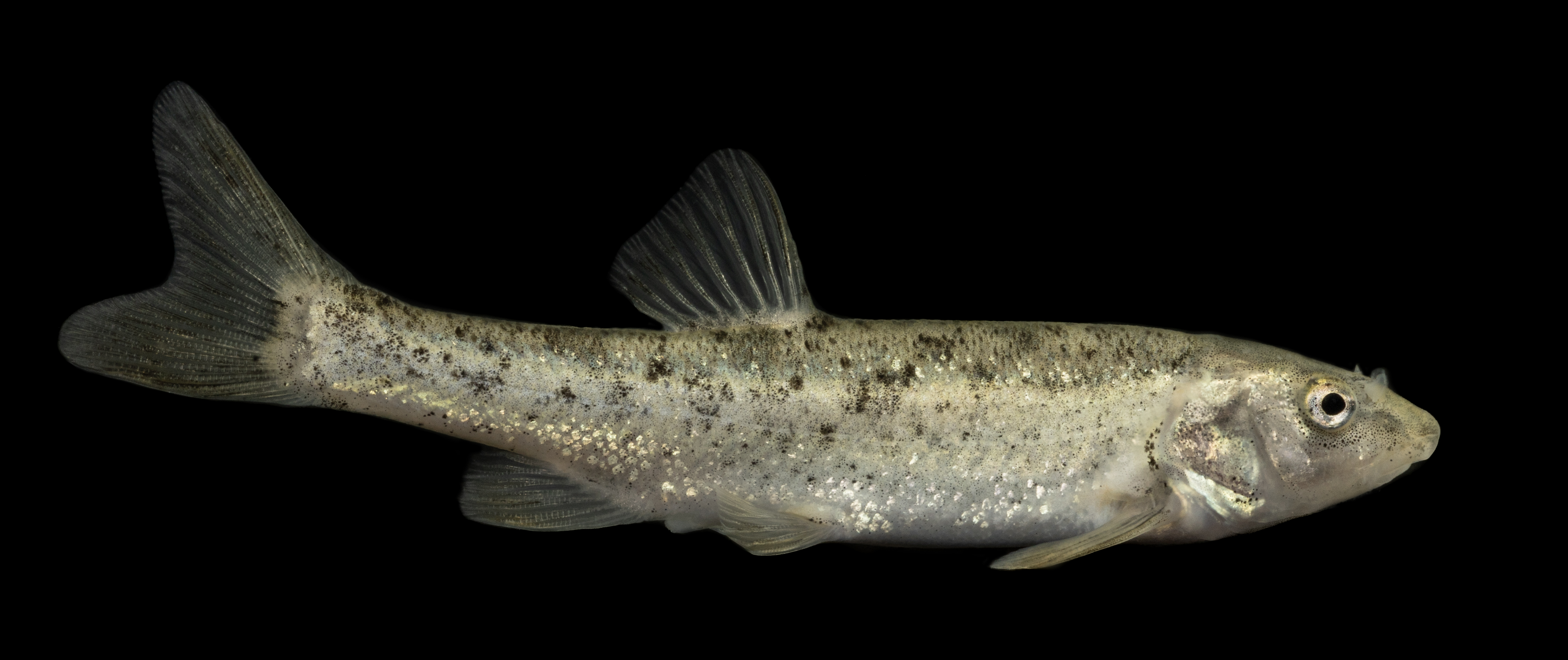

Scientific classification
- Kingdom: Animalia
- Phylum: Chordata
- Class: Actinopterygii
- Order: Cypriniformes
- Family: Leuciscidae
- Genus: Rhinichthys
- Species: R. osculus
- Subspecies: R. o. thermalis

Trinomial name
- Rhinichthys osculus thermalis (Hubbs and Kuhne, 1937)

= Kendall Warm Springs dace =

Speckled minnow endemic to Wyoming

The Kendall Warm Springs dace (Rhinichthys osculus thermalis) is a speckled minnow subspecies of the speckled dace endemic to the Kendall Warm Springs in Wyoming; the only fish to inhabit the temperate freshwaters. Adults often only reach 2 inches in length. The fish was originally designated as a subspecies due to its distinct morphological features from other Rhinichthys osculus, which arose from its isolation in the Kendall Warm Springs within which lies its only habitat. The springs can be located in Western Wyoming within the Bridger-Teton National Forest at an elevation of 7,800 feet.

== Endangerment and conservation ==
The primary threats to the fish were once overfishing, pollution, and habitat degradation. As well, the springs were used for bathing and laundry, and the detergents seemed to negatively impact fish populations, but in 1975 this was prohibited along with the use of them as bait fish in efforts to begin conserving the species. In the 1960s the Forest Service also constructed fencing around the perimeter of the springs spanning nearly 160 miles in efforts to keep the nearby livestock from contributing to habitat degradation in the springs. Today the species could see issues in a lower water table, invasive species, illegal fishing/capturing, and various causes of further habitat degradation, but the Forest Service continues to monitor the population and is actively protecting the habitat.
