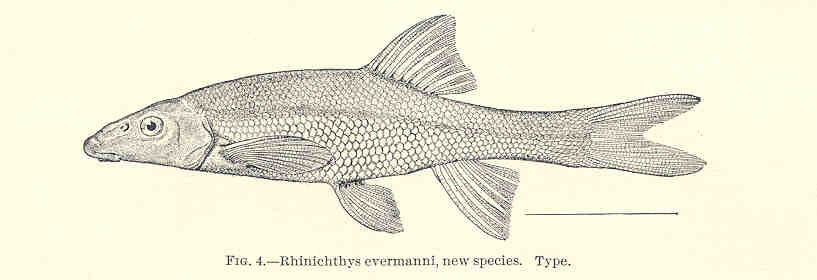

Conservation status
- Least Concern (IUCN 3.1)

Scientific classification
- Kingdom: Animalia
- Phylum: Chordata
- Class: Actinopterygii
- Order: Cypriniformes
- Family: Leuciscidae
- Subfamily: Pogonichthyinae
- Genus: Rhinichthys
- Species: R. evermanni

Binomial name
- Rhinichthys evermanni Snyder, 1908

= Umpqua dace =

Species of fish

Umpqua dace (Rhinichthys evermanni) is a species of ray-finned fish in the genus Rhinichthys. It is endemic to the United States where it inhabits the Umpqua River drainage in Oregon.
