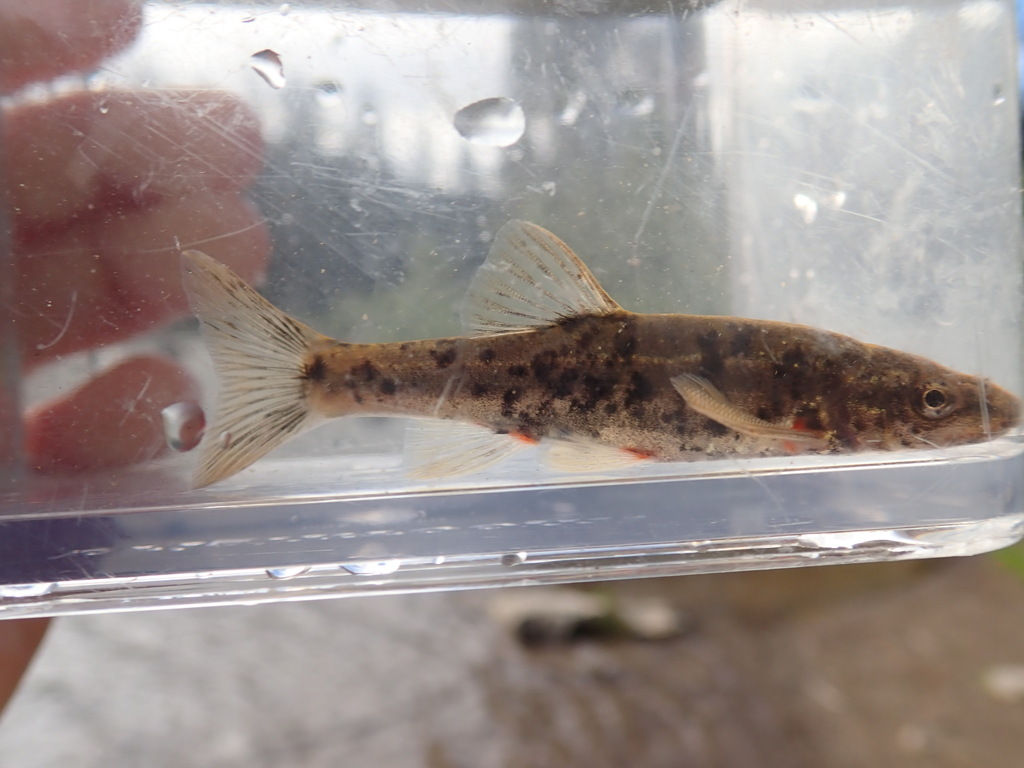

Scientific classification
- Kingdom: Animalia
- Phylum: Chordata
- Class: Actinopterygii
- Order: Cypriniformes
- Family: Leuciscidae
- Genus: Rhinichthys
- Species: R. nevadensis

Binomial name
- Rhinichthys nevadensis Gilbert, 1893

= Desert speckled dace =

Species of fish

The Desert speckled dace (Rhinichthys nevadensis) is a species of freshwater ray-finned fish belonging to the family Leuciscidae, the shiners, daces and minnows. This species is found in the southern Lahontan basin and desert springs and streams of Owens and Death Valley regions in Nevada and California,
