= Las Vegas dace =

Conservation status
- Extinct (1986) (IUCN 3.1)

- Presumed Extinct (1986) (NatureServe)

Scientific classification
- Kingdom: Animalia
- Phylum: Chordata
- Class: Actinopterygii
- Order: Cypriniformes
- Family: Leuciscidae
- Subfamily: Pogonichthyinae
- Genus: Rhinichthys
- Species: †R. deaconi

Binomial name
- †Rhinichthys deaconi R. R. Miller, 1984

Species of fish

The Las Vegas dace (Rhinichthys deaconi) was a species of freshwater ray-finned fish belonging to the family Leuciscidae, the shiners, daces and minnows.

It was found only in the Las Vegas Valley in the United States. It was declared extinct in 1986 by the International Union for Conservation of Nature.
