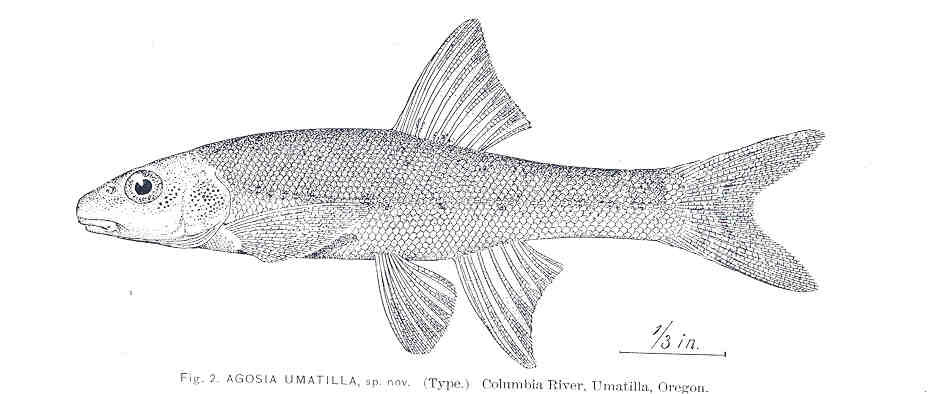

Conservation status
- Least Concern (IUCN 3.1)

Scientific classification
- Kingdom: Animalia
- Phylum: Chordata
- Class: Actinopterygii
- Order: Cypriniformes
- Family: Leuciscidae
- Subfamily: Pogonichthyinae
- Genus: Rhinichthys
- Species: R. umatilla

Binomial name
- Rhinichthys umatilla (C. H. Gilbert & Evermann, 1894)

Synonyms
- Agosia umatilla Gilbert & Evermann, 1894

= Umatilla dace =

Species of fish

Umatilla dace (Rhinichthys umatilla) is a species of ray-finned fish in the genus Rhinichthys. It is found in the drainage basin of the Columbia River in British Columbia, Washington state, Oregon and Idaho.
