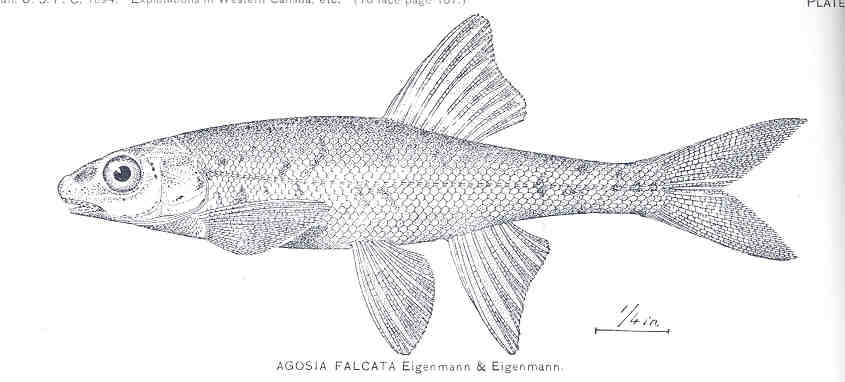

Conservation status
- Least Concern (IUCN 3.1)

Scientific classification
- Kingdom: Animalia
- Phylum: Chordata
- Class: Actinopterygii
- Order: Cypriniformes
- Family: Leuciscidae
- Subfamily: Pogonichthyinae
- Genus: Rhinichthys
- Species: R. falcatus

Binomial name
- Rhinichthys falcatus (C. H. Eigenmann & R. S. Eigenmann, 1893)

Synonyms
- Agosia falcata C. H. Eigenmann & R. S. Eigenmann, 1893; Agosia shuswap (C. H. Eigenmann & R. S. Eigenmann, 1893)

= Leopard dace =

Species of fish

Leopard dace (Rhinichthys falcatus) is a species of ray-finned fish in the genus Rhinichthys. It is found in the United States and Canada, where it inhabits the Fraser and Columbia river drainages in British Columbia, Oregon, Washington, and Idaho.
