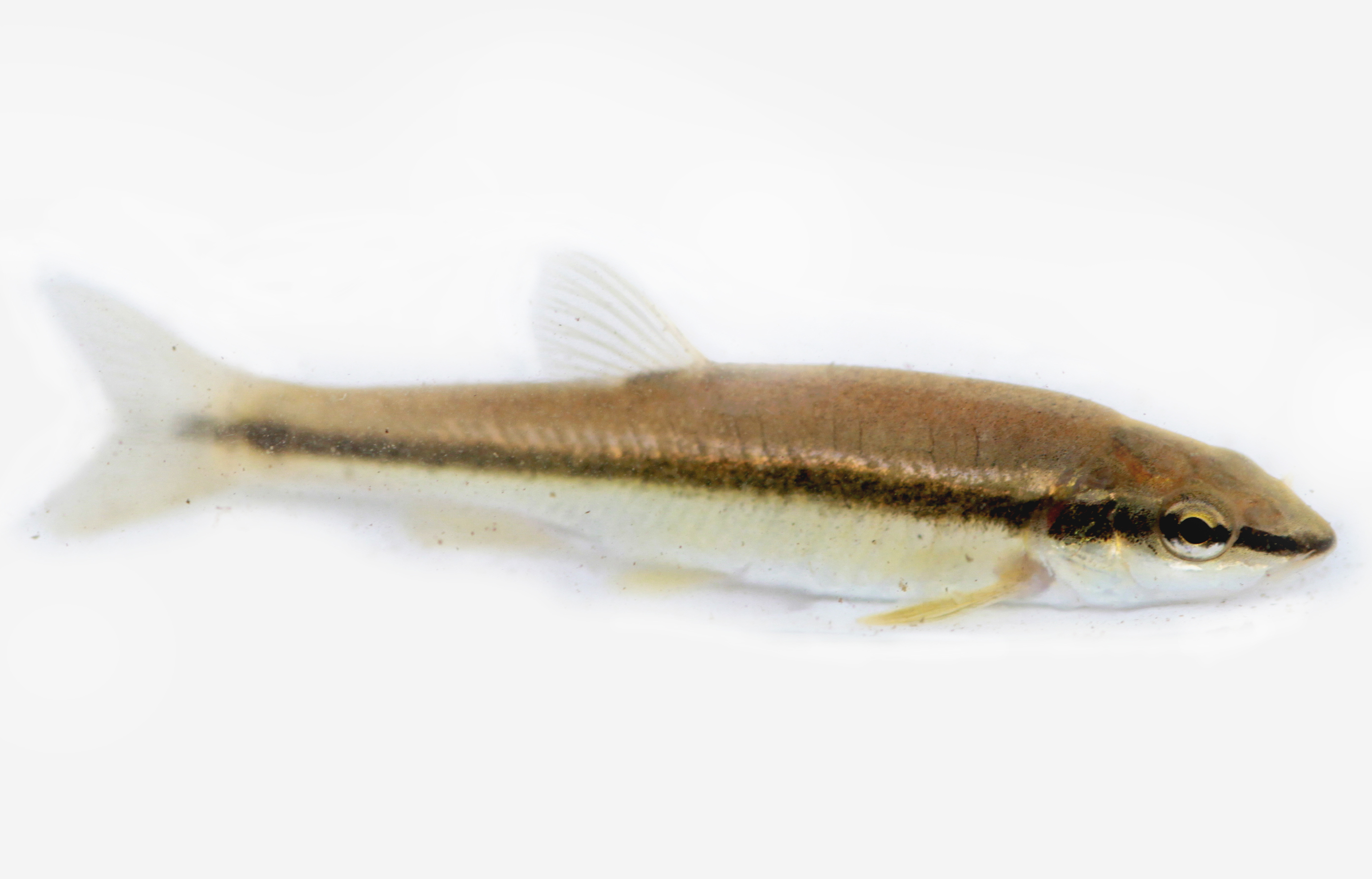
- Eastern blacknose dace (R. atratulus)

Scientific classification
- Kingdom: Animalia
- Phylum: Chordata
- Class: Actinopterygii
- Division: Teleostei
- Order: Cypriniformes
- Family: Leuciscidae
- Subfamily: Pogonichthyinae
- Genus: Rhinichthys; Agassiz, 1849

Type species
- Cyprinus atronasus Mitchill, 1815

Species
- see text.

Synonyms
- Argyreus Heckel, 1843; Tiaroga Girard, 1856; Apocope Cope, 1872; Eritrema Cope & Yarrow, 1875; Pararhinichthys Stauffer, Hocutt & Mayden, 1997

= Rhinichthys =

Genus of fishes

Rhinichthys, known as the riffle daces, is a genus of freshwater ray-finned fishes belonging to the family Leuciscidae, the shiners, daces and minnows. The type species is Rhinichthys atratulus, the blacknose dace. Rhinichthys species range throughout North America.

One of species in this genus, the loach minnow, is considered Vulnerable. It also includes the extinct Las Vegas dace, which was only first described in 1984 and had been declared extinct by 1986. The cheat minnow (Pararhinichthys bowersi), a natural hybrid of the longnose dace (R. cataractae) and the river chub (Nocomis micropogon), was formerly placed in this genus, but is now considered by some authorities to be valid under Pararhinichthys, although this is regarded as a synonyms of Rhinichthys by Eschmeyer's Catalog of Fishes.

Within Leuciscidae, the riffle daces are the sister group to a clade comprising Oregonichthys and Tiaroga.

== Species ==
These are the currently valid species included in this genus:

- Rhinichthys atratulus (Hermann, 1804) (Eastern blacknose dace)
- Rhinichthys cataractae (Valenciennes, 1842) (Longnose dace)
- †Rhinichthys deaconi R. R. Miller, 1984 (Las Vegas dace)
- Rhinichthys evermanni Snyder, 1908 (Umpqua dace)
- Rhinichthys falcatus (C. H. Eigenmann & R. S. Eigenmann, 1893) (Leopard dace)
- Rhinichthys gabrielino Moyle, Buckmaster & Su, 2023 (Santa Ana speckled dace)
- Rhinichthys klamathensis (Evermann & Meek, 1898) (Western speckled dace)
- Rhinichthys nevadensis Gilbert, 1893 (Desert speckled dace)
- Rhinichthys obtusus Agassiz, 1854 (Western blacknose dace)
- Rhinichthys osculus (Girard, 1856) (Speckled dace)
- Rhinichthys umatilla (C. H. Gilbert & Evermann, 1894) (Umatilla dace)
