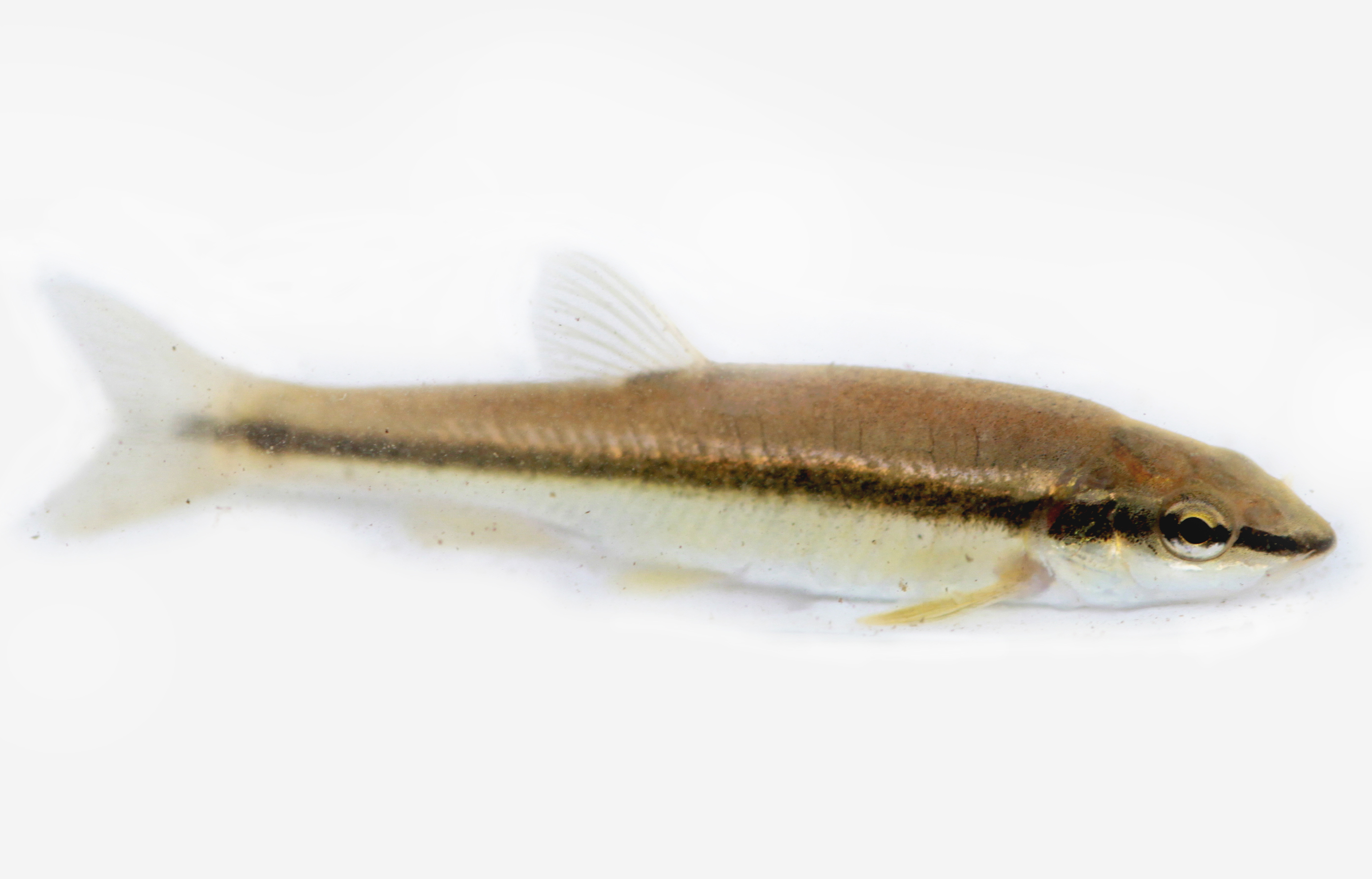
- Rhinichthys atratulus

Conservation status
- Least Concern (IUCN 3.1)

Scientific classification
- Kingdom: Animalia
- Phylum: Chordata
- Class: Actinopterygii
- Division: Teleostei
- Order: Cypriniformes
- Family: Leuciscidae
- Subfamily: Pogonichthyinae
- Genus: Rhinichthys
- Species: R. atratulus

Binomial name
- Rhinichthys atratulus (Hermann, 1804)

Synonyms
- Cyprinus atratulus Hermann, 1804; Cyprinus atronasus Mitchill, 1815; Cyprinus vittatus Rafinesque, 1817: Leuciscus elongatus Valenciennes, 1844; Leuciscus croceus Storer, 1845; Leuciscus productus Storer, 1846; Rhinichthys lunatus Cope, 1865; Rhinichthys renatus Garman, 1881; Leuciscus burtonius Lesueur, 1896

= Eastern blacknose dace =

Species of fish

Eastern blacknose dace (Rhinichthys atratulus) is a species of ray-finned fish in the genus Rhinichthys. Its name originates from the Old French word "dars" which is the nominative form of the word "dart" in reference to their swimming pattern. The western blacknose dace (Rhinichthys obtusus) formerly was considered conspecific. While morphologically the two species are not significantly different, they are allopatric. The eastern blacknose dace is found across the southeast portion of Canada and down along the United States' east coast. It is dark brown to olive on its dorsal surface and silvery white below, the two shades separated by the darkly pigmented lateral line. In the breeding season, males develop darker pigmentation and an orange lateral line. Blacknose dace live in rocky streams and rivers where they feed upon small invertebrates and microscopic biological matter and provide forage for larger fish.

== Physical description ==
As fry, this fish is 5 mm (3/16 in) long, and some of the larger eastern blacknose dace can reach slightly over 100 mm (3.9 in). They tend to live for two or three years and grow continuously during this period. They have a fusiform body shape and the mouth is in a subterminal position. The lateral line is darkly colored and has 56 to 70 scales from anterior to posterior. Above the lateral line coloration can vary between shades of dark brown and even olive, while below the lateral line coloration is lighter up until a white belly. Their caudal fin is forked, and their single dorsal fin has 8 fin rays and no spines. They have a pair of pectoral fins and a pair of abdominal ventral fins, as well as an anal fin with 7 rays. All fins are clear to yellow except males during spawning season acquire an orange to red tint in all fins and along the lateral line.

== Distribution and habitat ==
This fish is mainly found along the southern border of Canada extending along from Manitoba to the Atlantic Ocean, south along the east coast of the United States and slightly inland to South Carolina and Georgia. Scientists hypothesize that 20,000 years ago, as the glaciers retreated, blacknose dace recolonized the region from a single refugium in modern-day Connecticut, as soon as 75 years after the ice receded.

This fish tends to inhabit headwaters, creeks, and small rivers with swiftly moving water. However, fry mature in slower moving portions of the habitats like shoals and pool margins. The species as a whole prefers cool, rocky areas and uses the stones to rest under and around. They also use overhanging vegetation and undercut banks for additional refuge. In the winter, they migrate from headwater streams into rivers and can be found in deeper water under banks.

== Diet and predation ==
The eastern blacknose dace eats many small insects and other invertebrates including Acentria ephemerella, Telmatogetoninae, other Chironomidae, worms, algae, and small crustaceans such as young crayfish. They also feed on some plant species. Young fry forage in shallow silty water while adults move into riffles and deep eddying pools to find invertebrates.

Many larger fish feed on the eastern blacknose dace including smallmouth bass, brook trout, brown trout, and rainbow trout. They are also preyed upon by the common merganser and the great blue heron.

== Reproduction ==
Eastern blacknose dace spawning takes place between May and June and occurs in shallow water over gravel riffles. During this breeding season, the male develops nuptial tubercles on various parts of the body including the head and fins. His coloration also turns orange-red during this time along the lateral stripe and pectoral fins. Males of this species are nonterritorial and mate with one female. Eggs are deposited into crude nests which are depressions in the gravel created by vigorous movement during spawning. Larger females have higher fecundity and lay between 400 and 1,100 eggs. Following egg deposition, there is little to no parental care for the young.
