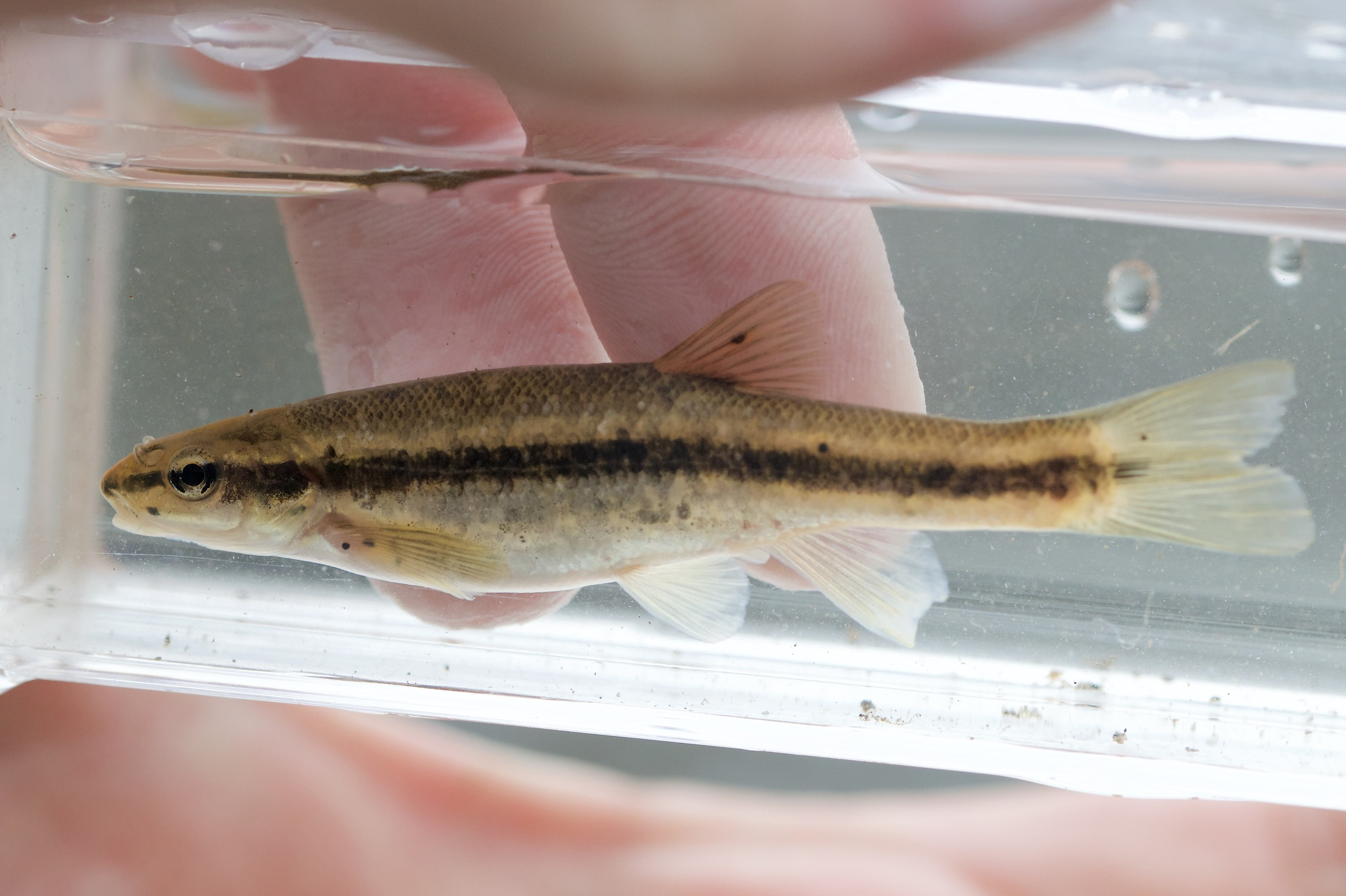

Conservation status
- Least Concern (IUCN 3.1)

Scientific classification
- Kingdom: Animalia
- Phylum: Chordata
- Class: Actinopterygii
- Order: Cypriniformes
- Family: Leuciscidae
- Subfamily: Pogonichthyinae
- Genus: Rhinichthys
- Species: R. obtusus

Binomial name
- Rhinichthys obtusus Agassiz, 1854

Synonyms
- Rhinichthys meleagris Agassiz, 1854

= Western blacknose dace =

Species of fish

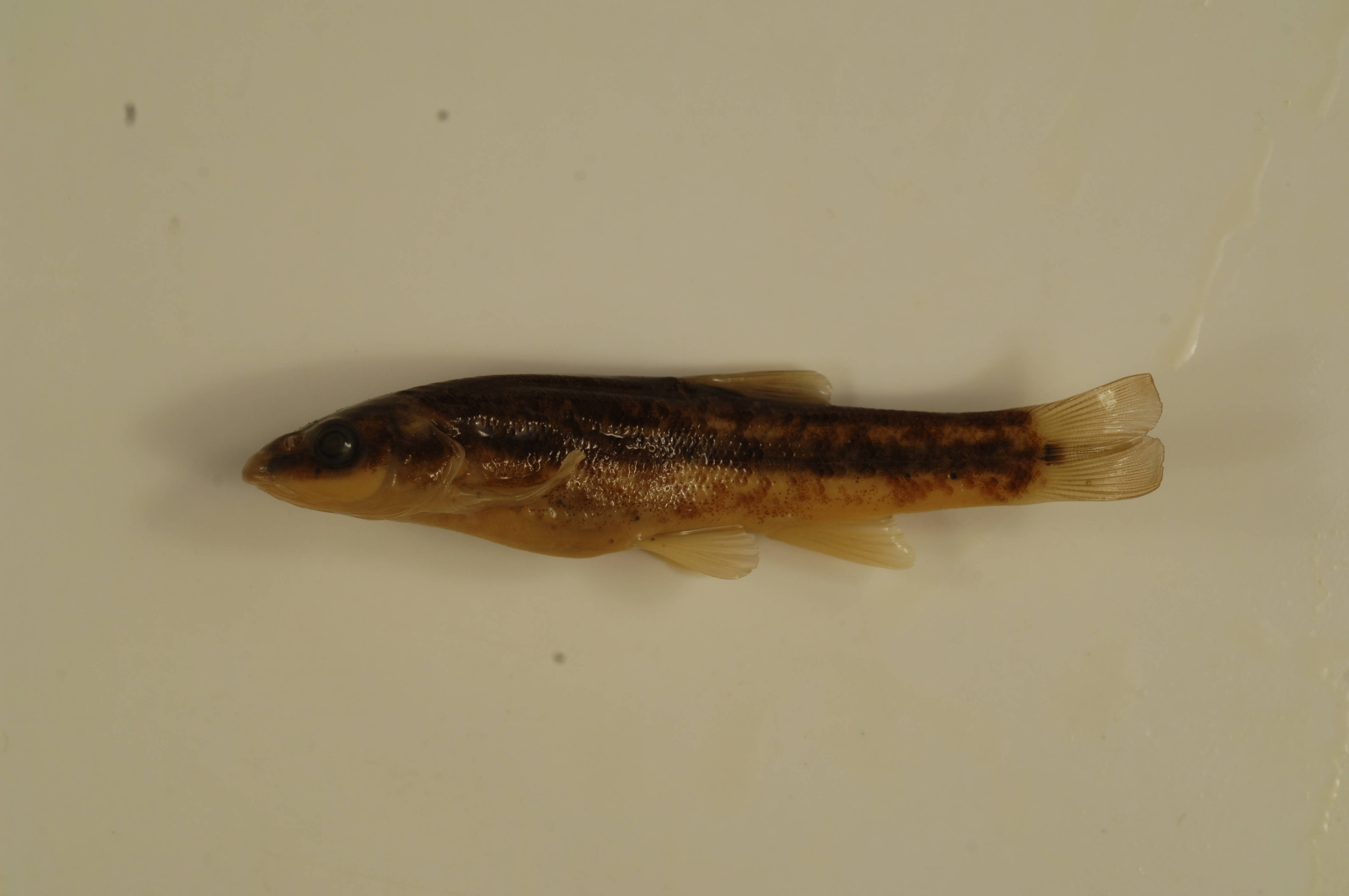
Western Blacknose Dace from Indiana.

Western blacknose dace (Rhinichthys obtusus) is a common species of ray-finned fish belonging to the family Leuciscidae, the shiners, daces and minnows, and the genus Rhinichthys. Western blacknose dace have tan to dark brown backs, lighter sides, and cream colored undersides. Dark blotches are sporadically scattered across their sides and backs. A distinctive dark colored mid-lateral stripe from the tip of the snout to the caudal peduncle is present. The snout is relatively long and they have a slightly sub-terminal mouth. The stripe is dark brown in females and is a rusty pink color in males during spawning season. The lateral stripe is more pronounced and the caudal spot is present in juveniles. Similar to other species of dace the western blacknose dace give the illusion of having no scales but in actuality the scales are so small they are hard to see. Western blacknose dace are typically 2–3 inches long but can grow to as long as 4 inches. They have a forked tail, single dorsal fin with 8 rays and no spines, a pelvic fin on the abdominal, no adipose fin, and an anal fin with 7 rays and no spines.

== Habitat and ecology ==
The western blacknose dace inhabits the upper Mississippi, Ohio, and Great Lakes drainages, from as far north as south-central Canada to northern Alabama and Georgia and east to eastern Lake Erie. Young daces prefer to inhabit shallower, quiet pools with silty bottoms while more mature daces prefer streams with consistently high turbulence patterns and plenty of places to hide since they are a prey species. Most often they occupy water depths ranging from 100 to 200 mm with gravel or cobble bottoms. They can also be found in riffles hiding under large rocks or boulders.

== Reproduction ==
Spawning begins in spring and continues to mid-summer depending on water temperature. The western blacknose dace spawn in areas with gravel bottoms unlike other daces who spawn in the beds of other Cyprinids. Since the western blacknose dace is so short lived, only living up to four years, daces begin reproducing after 2 years. Unlike other species of dace the two Ohio Rhinichthys species do not spawn in the nests of larger minnow species.

== Food and feeding habits ==
Western blacknose dace are mostly carnivorous and exhibit changes in diet as they grow older. Young dace diets consist mostly of Dipteran larvae. Mature daces continue to feed on Dipteran larvae when available but a large portion of their diet also include amphipods. The change in diet is thought to be because of the change in the areas that they inhabit once the daces mature.
