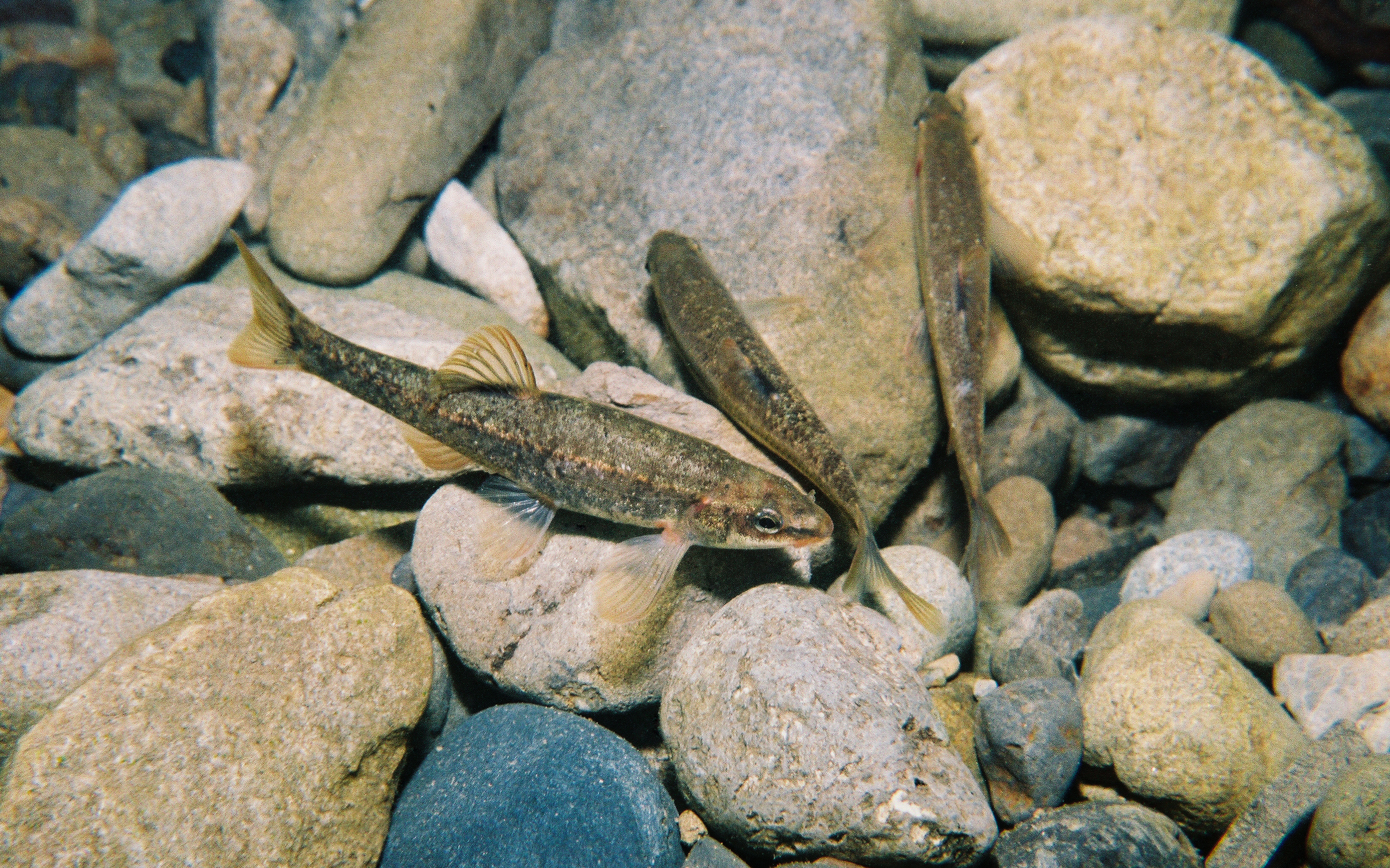

Conservation status
- Least Concern (IUCN 3.1)

Scientific classification
- Kingdom: Animalia
- Phylum: Chordata
- Class: Actinopterygii
- Division: Teleostei
- Order: Cypriniformes
- Family: Leuciscidae
- Genus: Rhinichthys
- Species: R. osculus

Binomial name
- Rhinichthys osculus (Girard, 1856)

Synonyms
- Argyreus osculus Girard, 1856; Agosia oscula (Girard, 1856); Apocope oscula (Girard, 1856); Argyreus nubilus Girard, 1856; Rhinichthys nubilus (Girard, 1856); Rhinichthys velifer Gilbert, 1893; Rhinichthys lariversi Lugaski, 1972

= Speckled dace =

Species of fish

The speckled dace (Rhinichthys osculus), also known as the spotted dace and the carpita pinta, is a species of freshwater ray-finned fish belonging to the family Leuciscidae, the shiners, daces and minnows. It is found in temperate freshwater in North America, from Sonora, Mexico, to British Columbia, Canada.

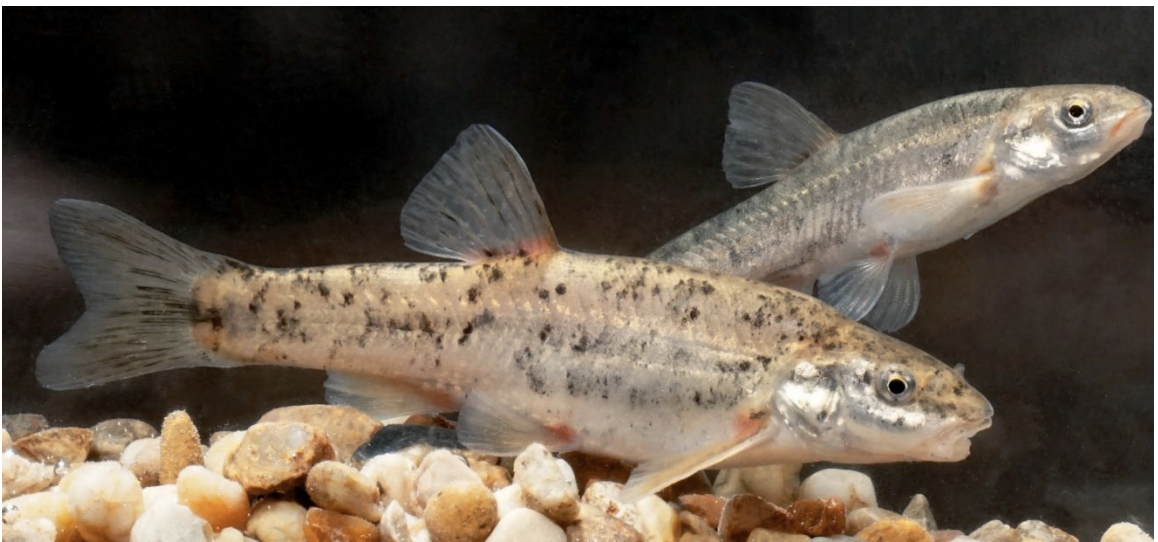
Picture from U.S. Fish and Wildlife showing breeding speckled dace colors. U.S. Fish & Wildlife Service. 2023. Speckled Dace (Rhinichthys osculus) Ecological Risk Screening Summary.

Speckled dace have a variety of unofficial names. Some of these include western dace, pacific dace, spring dace, and dusky dace. Dace is derived from the Middle English word that means dart.

== Description ==
The speckled dace is normally small, usually less than 8 centimeters. They are recognized for having a thick caudal peduncle, bluntly pointed snout, small scales, and small eyes. They have inferior mouths and pharyngeal teeth that are strongly hooked and have a slight grinding surface. Typically, the teeth are seen to have a barbel at the end of each maxilla. The dorsal fin is located behind the pelvic fin and the anal fin normally has 7 rays. Speckled dace color varies, but most fish from this species that are over 3 centimetres (1.2 in), have dark speckles on the back and sides, dark blotches on side, a spot at the base of the caudal peduncle, and a stripe on the head. These fish are usually darker yellow to darker green with the belly color ranging from yellow to white. During breeding, both male and female fin bases turn orange to red, and males will often have red snouts and lips in addition.

The Foskett speckled dace, found in "harsh conditions" of the desert waters of the Great Basin spanning parts of Southeastern Oregon and Nevada, has been listed as threatened under the Endangered Species Act since 1985. From 2011 through 2016, the fish's population fluctuated from a low of 1,728 to a high of 24,888. Prior to listing, the population was estimated to be 1,500 to 2,000. In 2018, U.S. Fish and Wildlife Service officials proposed removing federal protections. Robyn Thorson, the Service's pacific region director, said in a statement; "We attribute this impressive accomplishment to our partners who have worked so hard on the recovery of the dace. This news builds on other recent successes, including two Oregon fishes that were delisted due to recovery, the Oregon chub and the Modoc sucker."

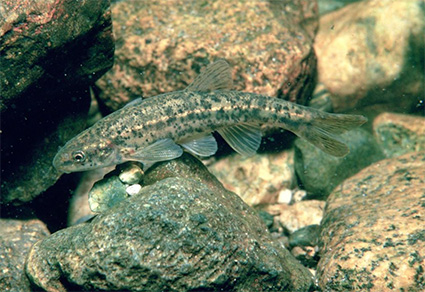

=== Species ===
There are several species and subspecies, including:

- R. o. larversi – Big Smoky Valley Speckled dace
- R. o. lethoporus – Independence Valley Speckled dace
- R. o. moapae – Moapa Speckled Dace
- R. o. yarrowi – Colorado River Speckled Dace
- R. o. oligoporus – Clover Valley Speckled Dace
- †R. o. reliquus – Grass Valley Speckled Dace
- R. o. thermalis – Kendall Warm Springs Dace
- R. o. velifer – Pahranagat speckled dace
- R. o. carringtonii – Bonneville Speckled Dace
- R. o. oligoporus – Clover Valley Speckled Dace
- R. o. osculus – Gila Speckled Dace
- R. o. adobe – Sevier Speckled Dace
- R. o. nubilus – Blackside Speckled Dace
- R. o. ssp – Moniter speckled dace
- R. o. ssp – Foskett speckled dace
- R. o. ssp – Meadow Valley Wash speckled dace
- R. o. ssp – White River speckled dace
- R. o. ssp – Monitor Valley speckled dace

Recent genetic work has elevated multiple R. osculus Subspecies to full species status, including:

- R. nevadensis – Desert Speckled Dace (Lahontan, Owens, and Amargosa Populations)
- R. klamathensis – Western Speckled Dace (Sacramento, Klamath and Warner Populations)
- R. gabrielino – Santa Ana Speckled Dace

== Distribution ==
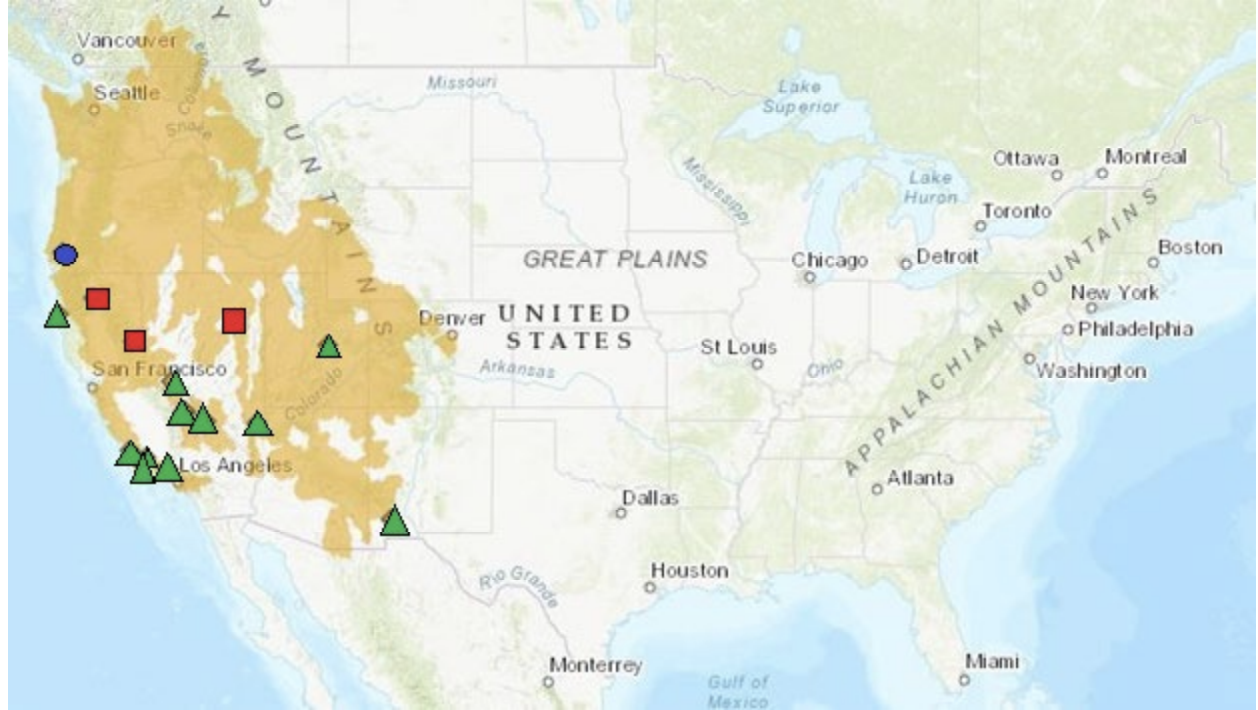
Speckled Dace native distribution map (orange shading) and the various points represent nonnative records. U.S. Fish & Wildlife Service. 2023. Speckled Dace (Rhinichthys osculus) Ecological Risk Screening Summary.

Speckled dace are the only fish native to all major Western drainage systems from Canada south to Sonora, Mexico. R. osculus have the widest geographic range of any freshwater dispersing fish in western North America. Studies show there are 3 major genetically distinct lineages in California that fit with the geologic history of California. Within these groups, there are 12 major areas they are native to in California including Death Valley, Owens Valley, eastern Sierra drainages, Surprise Valley, Klamath-trinity basin, Pit River drainage, Sacramento drainage, the Lorenzo, Pajaro, and Salinas Rivers. As well as the San Luis Obispo, Pismo, and Arroyo Grande Creeks, Morro Bay drainage, and the San Gabriel, Santa Ana and Los Angeles river basins. Studies suggest that even within the Klamath-trinity basin there are three genetically distinct groups which are named after their geographic distribution; Klamath, Trinity, and Jenny.

Canada is the northern limit of the speckled dace's distribution, and there it is found only in isolated parts of the Kettle and Granby Rivers. It is possible that, along with the Salish sucker (Catostomus sp.), the speckled dace was one of the first fish to recolonize the rivers of British Columbia following the Ice Age. It is believed that spawning in Canada occurs once a year during the summer in fish older than two years. During breeding, many males often accompany a single female who broadcasts adhesive eggs over the gravelly stream bed. Canadian populations of the fish were last sampled in 1977, and then only 400 individuals were collected. Few of the fish caught were adults, suggesting that speckled dace mortality may be high. However, not enough data is available to determine accurately whether the population is self-sustaining or in decline. The speckled dace arrived in the Los Angeles area streams about 1.9 million years ago.

== Biology ==
Speckled dace are habitat generalists and can inhabit a variety of different types of habitats. R. osculus inhabit small springs, rushing brooks, pools in streams, rivers, and lakes. The commonality these all share, in which speckled dace need, is well-oxygenated water, deep cover such as aquatic plants, and moving water from stream current. Their feeding habits include small invertebrates, especially ones found in riffles such as larvae of hydropsychid caddisflies, mayflies, and midges. In lakes on the other hand, they tend to go for bigger prey such as flying insects at the water’s surface and zooplankton. The feeding habit all depends on seasonality as well. Breeding season for speckled dace usually happens during spring to early summer. This species also has a high potential-reproductive rate and mature in as few as two years. In lakes, they will find shallow areas for spawning or swim upstream to find the gravel edge of a riffle. Once the females release eggs onto rocks, they will hatch in about 6 days and remain in the gravel for 6–7 days. During breeding, many males often accompany a single female who broadcasts adhesive eggs. Each female produces between 450–2000 eggs in a season. 200 and 500 eggs. Research argues that when competitive interactions occur in creeks, the speckled dace will inhabit the riffles at the lower end due to their resiliency to a wide range of water temperatures.

== Conservation status ==
Not much is known on the conservation status of speckled dace, but literature suggests most of the subspecies are not listed under the US Endangered Species Act. The Fockett spring speckled dace is the exception as it conserved under this act. This subspecies lives in a small, isolated desert spring in the Warner Basin in Oregon. In 1995, a different subgroup of speckled dace, Santa Ana speckled dace, was listed as a species of special concern by the California Department of Fish and Wildlife. Then in 1998, it was listed as a species of concern by the US Forest Service. Threats to speckled dace include water use from reduced flow during certain seasons due to irrigation and consumption uses, habitat loss potentially through hydro development, industrial land use such as agriculture, and invasive piscivorous fish. Some specific threats to the R. osculus are reduced flows in the summer and autumn due to irrigation and other consumptive uses, loss of habitat through hydro development, increased siltation and substrate embeddedness from agricultural land clearing and forestry activity, and predation by piscivorous fish.
