= Peter B. Moyle =

American zoologist

Distinguished Professor Emeritus Peter B. Moyle PhD
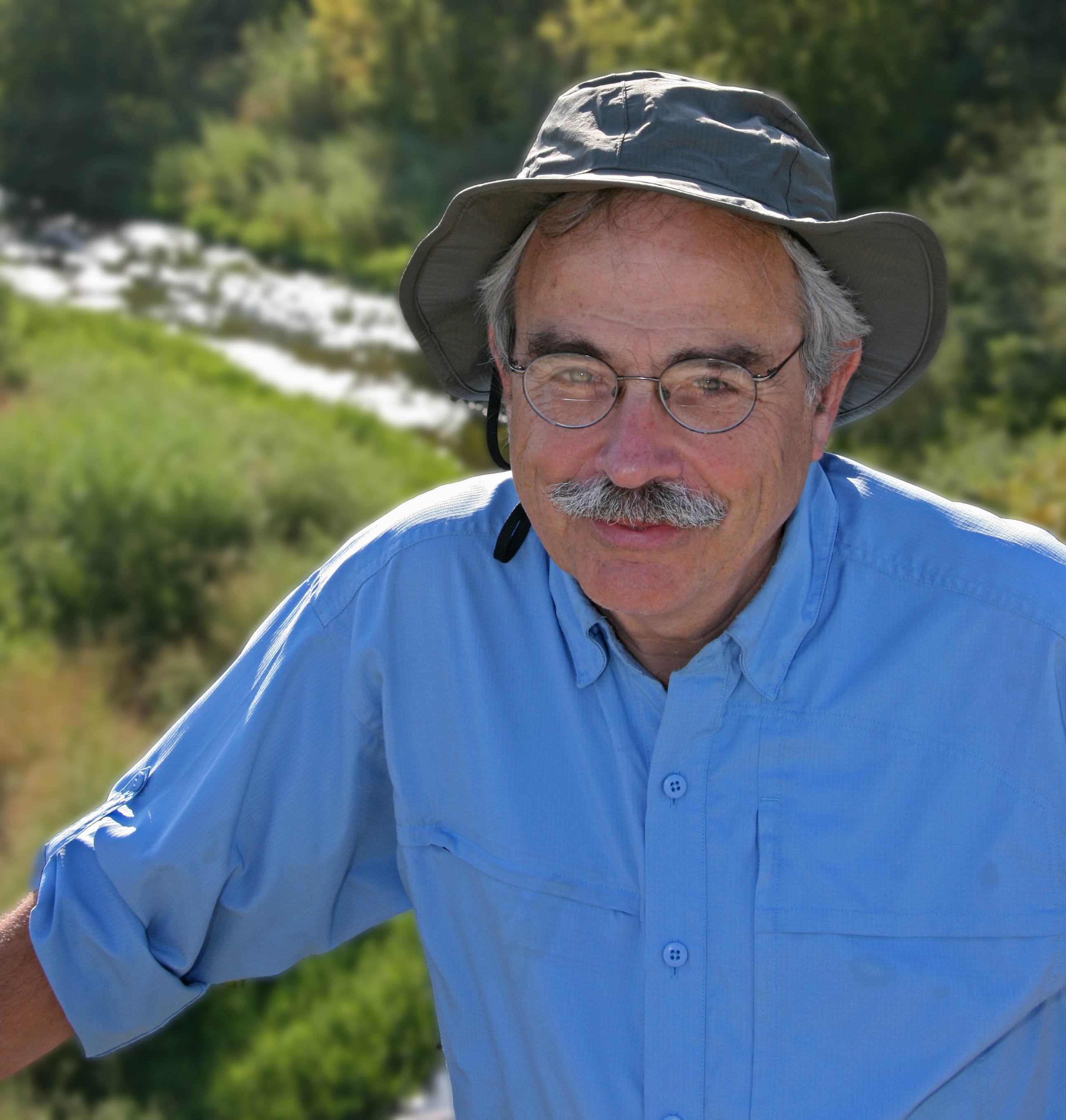
- Peter B. Moyle, (2009)
- Born: 1942 (age 83–84); Minnesota
- Occupations: Zoologist; Distinguished Professor of Fish Biology, Emeritus; Associate Director, Center for Watershed Science, University of California-Davis
- Known for: Educator-lead author of a widely used text in fish biology (5 editions) and author of Inland Fishes of California, the standard reference work on CA fishes. Research team leader – developed quantitative methods to evaluate status, distribution, and ecology of native and non-native fishes of California; quantified potential impacts of climate change on each species

Academic background
- Education: 1964 University of Minnesota, B.A., Zoology; 1966 Cornell University, M.S., Conservation; 1969 University of Minnesota, PhD, Zoology
- Alma mater: University of Minnesota

Academic work
- Discipline: Zoology, Conservation Biology
- Institutions: 1969—1972 Assistant Professor, Biology, California State University, Fresno, CA; 1972—2015 Assistant to Full Professor, University of California-Davis; 2015-present Distinguished Professor Emeritus.
- Main interests: Ecology and conservation of estuarine and freshwater fishes, especially in California.
- Website: https://watershed.ucdavis.edu/people/peter-b-moyle

Peter B. Moyle (born 1942 in Minnesota) is Distinguished Professor Emeritus in the Department of Wildlife, Fish and Conservation Biology and associate director of the Center for Watershed Sciences at the University of California, Davis. He has studied the ecology and conservation of fishes in freshwater and estuarine habitats in California (US) for over fifty years. He has a special interest in salmonid fishes and in the state's highly endemic freshwater and estuarine fish fauna. Moyle has authored or co-authored more than 270 peer-reviewed publications, including 10 books, and over 225 other publications, including ca. 75 blogs.

== Areas of research ==
Moyle's primary areas of research include ecology and conservation of California's endemic fishes and their habitats, the biology of the state's freshwater, estuarine, and anadromous fishes (native and non-native), and the formation of novel aquatic ecosystems.

Much of his early work in California involved surveying the distribution and abundance of native fish species in order to establish a baseline understanding of the scope of the state's fish diversity. This includes research over 40 years of monthly fish and macroinvertebrate sampling at multiple locations in Suisun Marsh. Examples include historical reviews of California's two primary salmon species — Chinook salmon and coho salmon — both of which are the current focus of intense management efforts and public interest because of their endangered population status despite their significant economic and cultural value. Other early projects involved the identification and spatial delineation of different habitat types important to the state's freshwater species that could be used in management planning and application. From the early days of Moyle's career at UC Davis, his reputation of “defending the underfish” (displayed on the Peanuts cartoon outside his office door) has profoundly pervaded the fisheries profession. He started the ichthyology collection at the Museum of Wildlife and Fish Biology in 1972; today, the collection contains 30,000 specimens and is among the most important modern collections of inland and native California fishes due to Moyle's ongoing involvement.

In addition to research efforts on the Central Valley region comprising the Sacramento-San Joaquin River system, Moyle's research group has conducted studies on the fish faunas and habitats in the Klamath/Trinity River and Eel River systems, the 2nd and 3rd largest river systems of California. His recent work has also focused on the ecology and management of floodplains, and applying reconciliation ecology to the management of the San Francisco Estuary. His current principal study areas are the streams of California and the San Francisco Estuary. He has also recently collaborated with geneticists to further resolve the taxonomic relationships and evolutionary history of specific native fish species that heretofore had been assigned ambiguous taxonomic categorization.

One of Peter's most profound influences on fish biology and fisheries science has been through his extensive cadre of students and other colleagues.

== Selected associated activities ==
Outside of his university duties, Moyle has participated in other activities, including, for example:

- Responsible for the listing of Delta smelt as a federal threatened species, which resulted in significant changes to water management in the San Francisco Estuary.
- Established a monthly monitoring program, in 1980, of the fishes of Suisun Marsh, part of the San Francisco Estuary, demonstrating its importance as a nursery area. The program is still running today.
- Contributor to the Sierra Nevada Ecosystem Program, a comprehensive assessment of the natural ecosystems of the Sierra Nevada range in California, as authorized by the United States Congress.
- Expert witness in successful legal actions to obtain ecologically functional flows in Putah Creek, San Joaquin River, and other California streams.

== Professional societies and organizations ==
- American Fisheries Society (national & local chapters)
- American Society of Ichthyologists and Herpetologists
- Ecological Society of America
- Desert Fishes Council
- Society for Conservation Biology
- American Association for the Advancement of Science
- American Institute of Biological Sciences

== Recent awards and recognition ==
- Outstanding Achievement Award, Association of Fisheries Research Biologists (2007)
- Award of Excellence, highest award of American Fisheries Society (2007)
- Brown-Nichols Award, Delta Science (2010)
- Award of Distinction, UC Davis College of Agricultural and Environmental Sciences (2012)
- Golden Trout Award, California Trout (2013)
- Fellow, American Fisheries Society (2015)
- Fellow, Ecological Society of America (2016)
- Fellow, American Association for the Advancement of Science (2016)
- International Leopold Conservation Award, Fly Fishers International (2019)
- Conservationist of Year, Fly Fisherman Magazine (2020)

== Selected publications ==
Author or co-author of over 270 peer-reviewed publications, including 10 books/monographs. Ca. 250 blogs, op-eds, book reviews, etc.

- Moyle, P. B. 2002. Inland Fishes of California. Berkeley: University of California Press 502 pp.
- 1986 Jett, S., and P. B. Moyle. The exotic origins of fishes depicted on prehistoric Mimbres pottery from New Mexico. American Antiquity 51: 688-720.
- Moyle, P. B. and Moyle, M. A., 1991. Introduction to fish imagery in art. Environmental Biology of Fishes 31(1), pp. 5-23.
- Moyle, P. B. and J. J. Cech, Jr. 2004. Fishes: an Introduction to Ichthyology. 5th Edition. Prentice-Hall: Upper Saddle River, N. J. 590 pp.
- Lund, J., E. Hanak, W. Fleenor, W. Bennett, R. Howitt, J. Mount, and Moyle, P. B. 2010. Comparing Futures for the Sacramento-San Joaquin Delta. Berkeley, University of California Press. 229 pp.
- Marchetti, M. P. and P. B. Moyle. 2010. Protecting life on Earth: an introduction to conservation science. Berkeley: University of California Press. 232 pp.
- Hanak, E., J. Lund, A. Dinar, B. Gray, R. Howitt, J. Mount, Moyle, P. B., and B. Thompson. 2011. Managing California's Water from Conflict to Reconciliation. San Francisco, PPIC. 482 pp.
- Moyle, P. B., A. D. Manfree, and P. L. Fiedler. 2014. Suisun Marsh: Ecological History and Possible Futures. Berkeley: University of California Press.
- Moyle, P. B., R. M. Quiñones, J.V.E. Katz, and Jeff Weaver. 2015. Fish Species of Special Concern in California. 3rd edition. Sacramento: California Department of Fish and Wildlife. 842 pp. https://www.wildlife.ca.gov/Conservation/Fishes/Special-Concrmr
- Opperman, J.J, P. B. Moyle, E. W. Larsen, J. L. Florsheim, and A. D. Manfree. 2017. Floodplains: Processes, Ecosystems, and Services in Temperate Regions. Berkeley: University of California Press. 258 pp.
- Williams, J. G., P. B. Moyle, M. Kondolf, and A. Webb. 2019. Environmental Flow Assessment: Methods and Applications. Oxford, U.K.: Wiley. 220 pp.
- Mosepele, K.; Moyle, P. B.; Merron, G. S.; Purkey, D.; Mosepele, B. 2009. "Fish, floods, and ecosystem engineers: aquatic conservation in the Okavango Delta, Botswana". BioScience. 59: 53–64. doi:10.1525/bio.2009.59.1.9. S2CID 85628326.
- Moyle, P. B.; Katz, J. V. E.; Quiñones, R. M. 2011. "Rapid decline of California's native inland fishes: a status assessment". Biological Conservation 144(10): 2414–2423. doi:10.1016/j.biocon.2011.06.002
- Moyle, P. B., W. Bennett, J. Durand, W. Fleenor, B. Gray, E. Hanak, J. Lund, J. Mount. 2012. Where the wild things aren't: making the Delta a better place for native species. San Francisco: Public Policy Institute of California. 53 pp.
- Kiernan, J. D.; Moyle, P. B.; Crain, P. K. 2012. "Restoring native fish assemblages to a regulated California stream using the natural flow regime concept". Ecological Applications. 22 (5): 1472–1482. doi:10.1890/11-0480.1. PMID 22908707.
- Kiernan, J. D.; Moyle, P. B.. 2012. "Flows, droughts, and aliens: factors affecting the fish assemblage in a Sierra Nevada, California, stream" (PDF). Ecological Applications. 22 (4): 1146–1161. doi:10.1890/11-1047.1. PMID 22827124. S2CID 23776684. Archived from the original (PDF) on 2020-02-08.
- Börk; Krovoza, K.S. J. F.; Katz, J. V.; Moyle, P. B. 2012. "The rebirth of California Fish & Game Code 5937: water for fish". University of California Davis Law Review. 45: 809–913.
- Moyle, P. B.; Kiernan, J. D.; Crain, P. K.; Quiñones, R. M. (2013). "Climate change vulnerability of native and alien freshwater fishes of California: a systematic assessment approach". PLOS ONE. 8 (5): e63883. Bibcode:2013PLoSO...863883M. doi:10.1371/journal.pone.0063883. PMC 3661749. PMID 23717503.
- Baumsteiger, J. and P. B. Moyle 2017. Assessing extinction. Bioscience 67: 357–366. https://doi.org/10.1093/biosci/bix001
- Baumsteiger, J. and P. B. Moyle. 2019. A reappraisal of the California Roach/Hitch (Cypriniformes, Cyprinidae, Hesperoleucus/Lavinia) species complex. Zootaxa 4543 (2): 2221–240. https://www.mapress.com/j/zt/article/view/zootaxa.4543.2.3
- Moyle, P. B. 2020. Living with aliens: nonnative fishes in the American Southwest. Pages 69–78 In D.L. Propst, J.E. Williams, K.R. Bestgen, and C.W. Hoagstrom, eds., Standing Between Life and Extinction: Ethics and Ecology of Conserving Aquatic Species in North American Deserts. Chicago: University of Chicago Press.
- Leidy, R. A. and P. B. Moyle. 2021. Keeping up with the status of freshwater fishes: a California (USA) perspective. Conservation Science and Practice 3(8), e474. https://doi.org/10.1111/csp2.474. 10 pp.
- Moyle, P. B. and D. K. Stompe. 2022. Chapter 11. Non-native fishes in estuaries. Pages 684–705 in A.K. Whitfield, K. W. Able. S. J. M. Blaber and M. Elliott, editors. Fish and Fisheries in Estuaries: a Global Perspective. Wiley.
- Moyle, P. B., N. Buckmaster, N. and Su, Y. 2023. Taxonomy of the Speckled Dace species complex (Cypriniformes: Leuciscidae, Rhinichthys) in California, USA. Zootaxa 5249(5): 501-539.

Contributions from Peter Moyle, with additional contributions by Joe Cech and Ron Yoshiyama, Professors Emeritus of Fish Biology, UC Davis.
