= Thomas Say =

American naturalist (1787–1834)

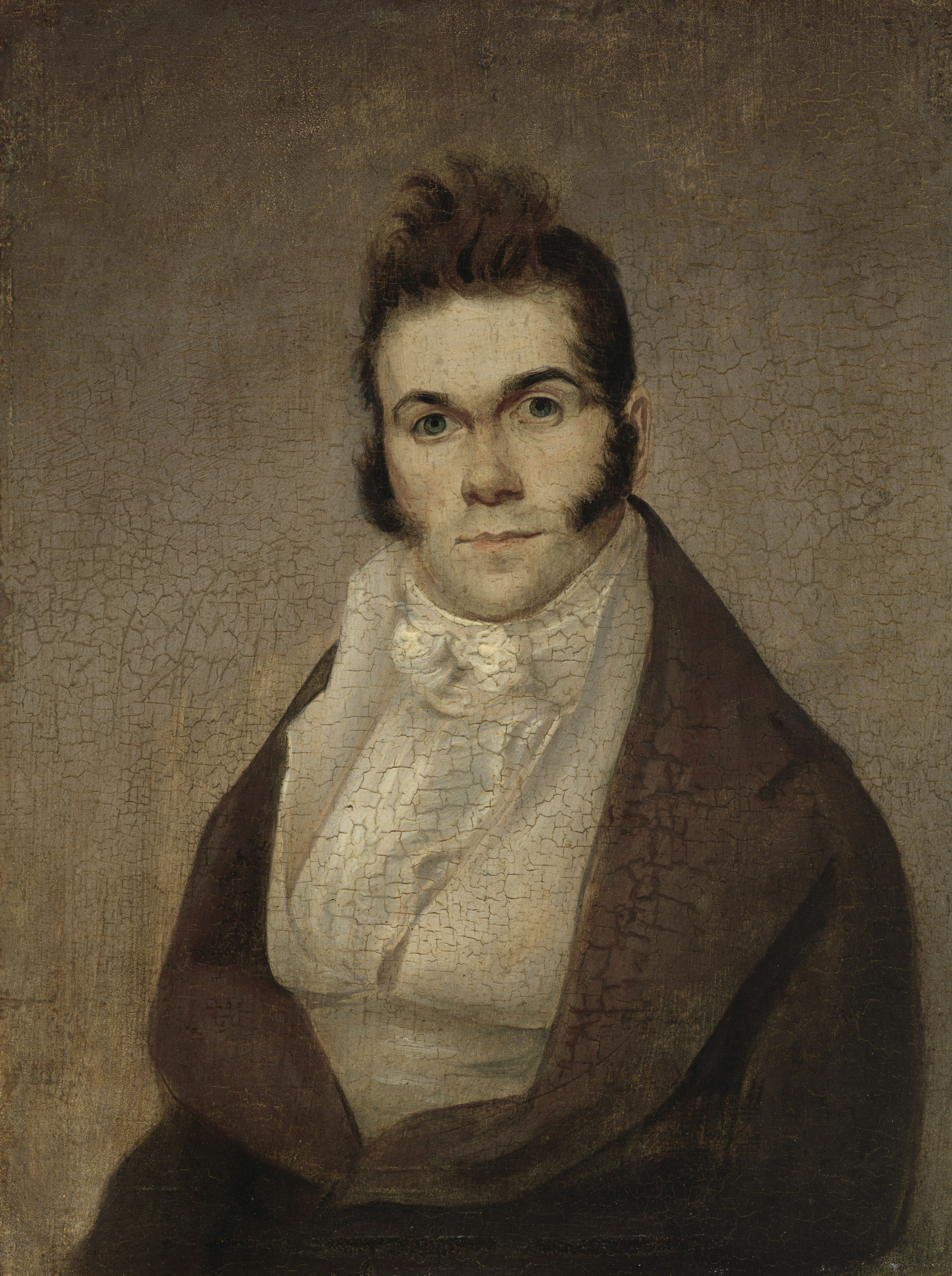
- Thomas Say by Joseph Wood, c. 1812
- Born: June 27, 1787; Philadelphia, Pennsylvania
- Died: October 10, 1834 (aged 47); New Harmony, Indiana
- Known for: "father of descriptive entomology in the United States"
- Scientific career
- Fields: Natural history, Entomology
- Workplaces: Academy of Natural Sciences
- Author abbrev. (zoology): Say

Thomas Say (June 27, 1787 – October 10, 1834) was an American entomologist, conchologist, and herpetologist. His studies of insects and shells, numerous contributions to scientific journals, and scientific expeditions to Florida, Georgia, the Rocky Mountains, Mexico, and elsewhere made him an internationally known naturalist. Say has been called the father of American descriptive entomology and American conchology. He served as librarian for the Academy of Natural Sciences of Philadelphia, curator at the American Philosophical Society (elected in 1817), and professor of natural history at the University of Pennsylvania.

== Early life and education ==
Born in Philadelphia into a prominent Quaker family, Thomas Say was the great-grandson of John Bartram, and the great-nephew of William Bartram. His father, Dr. Benjamin Say, was brother-in-law to another Bartram son, Moses Bartram. The Say family had a house, The Cliffs, at Gray's Ferry, adjoining the Bartram family farms in Kingessing Township, Philadelphia County. As a boy, Say often visited the family's Bartram's Garden, where he frequently took butterfly and beetle specimens to his great-uncle William.

== Career ==
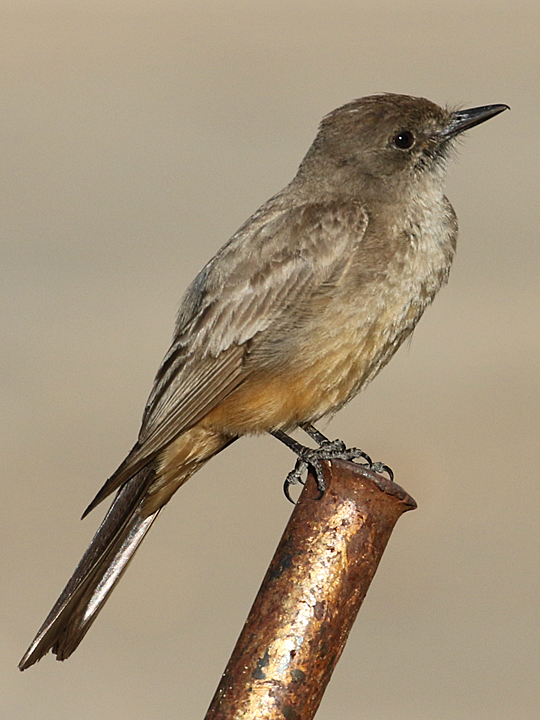
Say's phoebe (Sayornis saya)

Say trained to be an apothecary. A self-taught naturalist, Say helped found the Academy of Natural Sciences of Philadelphia (ANSP) in 1812. In 1816, he met Charles Alexandre Lesueur, a French naturalist, malacologist, and ichthyologist, who soon became a member of the ANSP and served as its curator until 1824.

At the ANSP, Say began his work on what he would publish as American Entomology. To collect insects, he made numerous expeditions to frontier areas, risking American Indian attacks and hazards of traveling in wild countryside. In 1818, Say accompanied his friend William Maclure, then the ANSP president and father of American geology; Gerhard Troost, a geologist; and other members of the academy on a geological expedition to the offshore islands of Georgia and Florida, then a Spanish colony.

In 1819–20, Major Stephen Harriman Long led an exploration to the Rocky Mountains and the tributaries of the Missouri River, with Say as zoologist. Their official account of this expedition included the first descriptions of the coyote, swift fox, western kingbird, band-tailed pigeon, rock wren, Say's phoebe, lesser goldfinch, lark sparrow, lazuli bunting, orange-crowned warbler, checkered whiptail lizard, collared lizard, ground skink, western rat snake, and western ribbon snake.

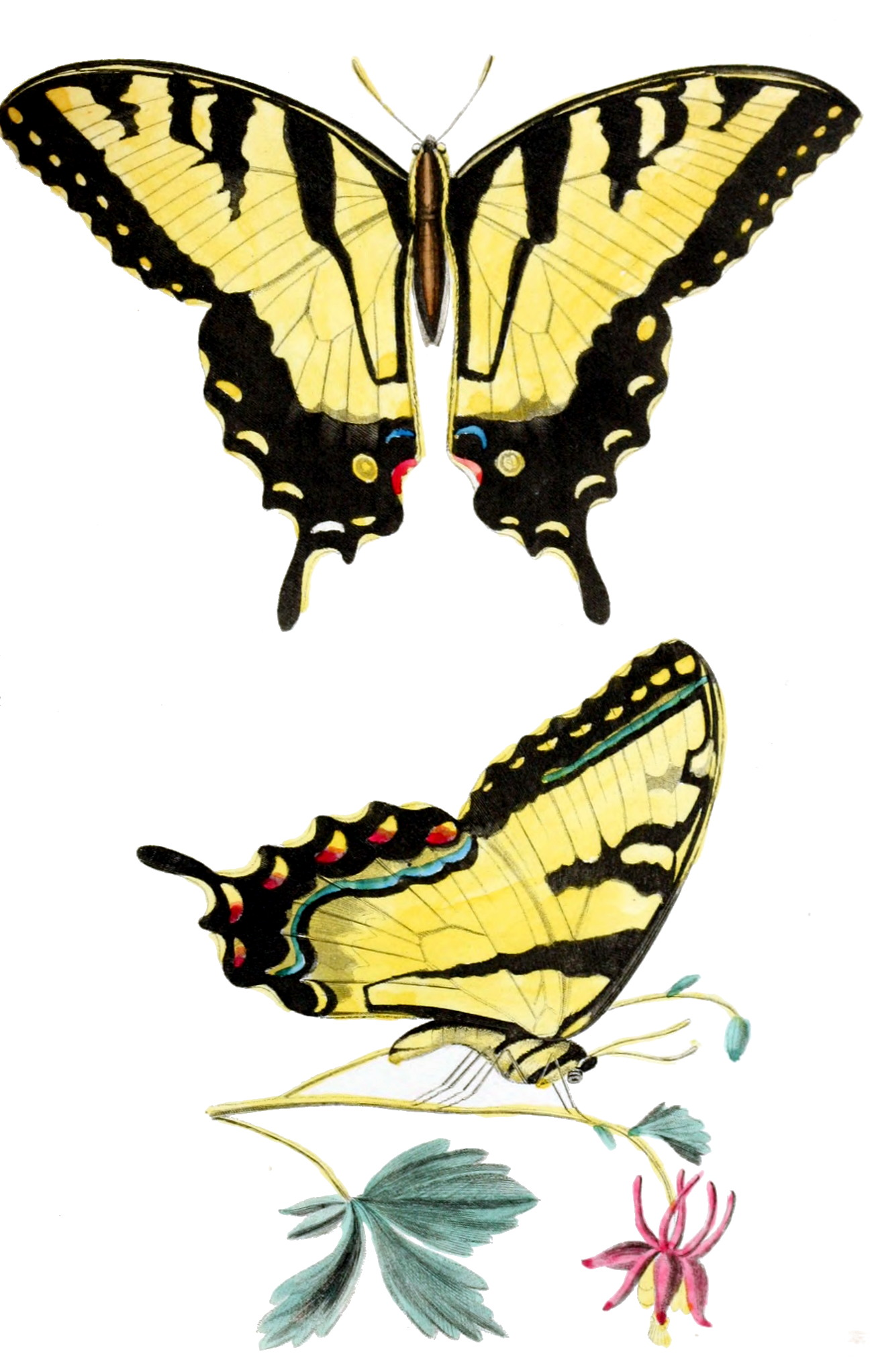
Papilio turnus (= Papilio glaucus), from American Entomology

In 1823, Say served as chief zoologist in Long's expedition to the headwaters of the Mississippi River. He traveled on the "Boatload of Knowledge" to the New Harmony Settlement in Indiana (1826–34), a utopian society experiment founded by Robert Owen. Say was accompanied by Maclure, Lesueur, Troost, and Francis Neef, an innovative pedagogue. There, he later met Constantine Samuel Rafinesque-Schmaltz, another naturalist.

On January 4, 1827, Say secretly married Lucy Way Sistare, whom he had met as one of the passengers to New Harmony, near the settlement. She was an artist and illustrator of specimens, as in the book American Conchology, and was elected as the first woman member of the Academy of Natural Sciences.

At New Harmony, Thomas Say carried on his monumental work describing insects and mollusks, leading to two classic works:

- American Entomology, or Descriptions of the Insects of North America, three volumes, Philadelphia, 1824–1828
- American Conchology, or Descriptions of the Shells of North America Illustrated from Coloured Figures from Original Drawings Executed from Nature, Parts 1–6, New Harmony, 1830–1834; Part 7, Philadelphia, 1836.

Many of the scientific names assigned by Say are no longer accepted. Lists of the former names matched with current scientific and common names are available.

During their years in New Harmony, Say and Lesueur experienced considerable difficulties. Say was a modest and unassuming man, who lived frugally like a hermit. He abandoned commercial activities and devoted himself to his studies, making difficulties for his family.

Say died, apparently from typhoid fever, in New Harmony on October 10, 1834, when he was 47 years old.

== Legacy and honors ==
Say described more than 1,000 new species of beetles, more than 400 species of insects of other orders, and seven well-known species of snakes.

Other zoologists honored him by naming several taxa after him:

- Dyspanopeus sayi (S. I. Smith, 1869) – Say's mud crab
- Portunus sayi (Gibbes, 1850) – a swimming crab of the family Portunidae
- Porcellana sayana (Leach, 1820) – an Atlantic porcelain crab
- Lanceola sayana (Bovallius, 1885) – an amphipod from the family Lanceolidae
- Calliostoma sayanum Dall, 1889 – a sea snail in the family Calliostomatidae
- Diodora sayi (Dall, 1899) – a sea snail in the family Fissurellidae
- Oliva sayana Ravenel, 1834 – a sea snail in the family Olividae
- Sayella Dall, 1885 – a genus of sea snails in the family Pyramidellidae
- Propeamussium sayanum (Dall, 1886) – a saltwater clam in the family Propeamussiidae
- Appalachina sayana (Pilsbry in Pilsbry & Ferriss, 1906) – a land snail in the family Polygyridae
- Pituophis catenifer sayi (Schlegel, 1837) – the bullsnake
- Sayornis (Bonaparte, 1854) – a genus in the tyrant flycatcher family
- Sciurus niger rufiventer - Say's squirrel
- Chlorochroa sayi (Stål, 1872) - Say's stink bug, a species of stink bug

== Published works ==
- Say, T. 1817. Description of seven species of American fresh water and land shells, not noticed in the systems. Part 1. Journal of the Academy of Natural Sciences of Philadelphia 1(1), 13–16. (BHL link)
- Say, T. 1817. Description of seven species of American fresh water and land shells, not noticed in the systems. Part 2. Journal of the Academy of Natural Sciences of Philadelphia 1(2), 17–18. (BHL link)
- Say, T. 1817. Descriptions of several new species of North American insects. Journal of the Academy of Natural Sciences of Philadelphia 1(2), 19–23. (BHL link)
- Say, T. 1817. Some account of the insect known by the name of Hessian Fly, and of a parasitic insect that feeds on it. Journal of the Academy of Natural Sciences of Philadelphia 1(3), 43–48. (BHL link)
- Say, T. 1817. On a new genus of the Crustacea, and the species on which it is established. Journal of the Academy of Natural Sciences of Philadelphia 1(4), 49–52. (Read July 8, 1817) (BHL link)
- Say, T. 1817. An account of the Crustacea of the United States. Part 1. Journal of the Academy of Natural Sciences of Philadelphia 1(4), 57–64. (Read August 5, 1817) (BHL link)
- Say, T. 1817. An account of the Crustacea of the United States. Part 2. Journal of the Academy of Natural Sciences of Philadelphia 1(5), 65–83. (Read August 5, 1817) (BHL link)
- Say, T. 1817. An account of the Crustacea of the United States. Part 3. Journal of the Academy of Natural Sciences of Philadelphia 1(6), 97–101. (Read August 5, 1817) (BHL link)
- Say, T. 1817. Description of new species of land and fresh water shells of the United States. Journal of the Academy of Natural Sciences of Philadelphia 1(6), 123–126. (Read October 28, 1817) (BHL link)
- Say, T. 1817. An account of the Crustacea of the United States. Part 4. Journal of the Academy of Natural Sciences of Philadelphia 1(6), 155–169. (Read November 4, 1817) (BHL link)
- Say, T. 1818. An account of the Crustacea of the United States. Part 5. Journal of the Academy of Natural Sciences of Philadelphia 1, 235–253. (Read November 11, 1817) (BHL link)
- Say, T. 1818. Account of two new genera, and several new species, of fresh water and land snails. Journal of the Academy of Natural Sciences of Philadelphia 1(7), 276–284. (Read May 25, 1818) (BHL link)
- Say, T. 1818. An account of the Crustacea of the United States. Part 6. Journal of the Academy of Natural Sciences of Philadelphia 1, 313–319. (Read June 10, 1818) (BHL link)
- Say, T. 1818. An account of the Crustacea of the United States. Part 7. Journal of the Academy of Natural Sciences of Philadelphia 1, 374–401. (Read June 10, 1818) (BHL link)
- Say, T. 1818. Notes on Professor Green's paper on the Amphibia, published in the September number of this journal. Journal of the Academy of Natural Sciences of Philadelphia 1(7), 405–407. (Read October 6, 1818) (BHL link)
- Say, T. 1818. An account of the Crustacea of the United States. Part 8. Journal of the Academy of Natural Sciences of Philadelphia 1, 423–441. (Read June 10, 1818) (BHL link)
- Say, T. 1818. Observations on some of the animals described in the account of the Crustacea of the United States. Journal of the Academy of Natural Sciences of Philadelphia 1, 442–444. (BHL link)
- Say, T. 1818. Appendix to the account of the Crustacea of the United States. Journal of the Academy of Natural Sciences of Philadelphia 1, 445–458. (Read December 1, 1818) (BHL link)
- Say, T. 1818. Description of a new genus of fresh water bivalve shells. Journal of the Academy of Natural Sciences of Philadelphia 1, 459–460. (BHL link)
- Say, T. 1818. Description of three new species of the genus Naesa. Journal of the Academy of Natural Sciences of Philadelphia 1, 482–485. (BHL link)
- Say, T. 1821. Descriptions of the Thysanourae of the United States. Journal of the Academy of Natural Sciences of Philadelphia 2, 11–13. (BHL link)
- Say, T. 1821. Descriptions of the Arachnides of the United States. Journal of the Academy of Natural Sciences of Philadelphia 2, 59–81. (BHL link)
- Say, T. 1821. Descriptions of the Myriapodae of the United States. Journal of the Academy of Natural Sciences of Philadelphia 2, 102–113. (BHL link)
- Say, T. 1821. Descriptions of Univalve shells of the United States. Journal of the Academy of Natural Sciences of Philadelphia 2, 149–178. (BHL link)
- Say, T. 1823. Descriptions of Dipterous insects of the United States. Part 1. Journal of the Academy of Natural Sciences of Philadelphia 3(1), 9–53. (BHL link)
- Say, T. 1823. Descriptions of Dipterous insects of the United States. Part 2. Journal of the Academy of Natural Sciences of Philadelphia 3(1), 73–104. (BHL link)
- Say, T. 1823. Descriptions of Coleopterous insects. Part 1. Journal of the Academy of Natural Sciences of Philadelphia 3(1), 139–215. (BHL link)
- Say, T. 1824. Descriptions of Coleopterous insects. Part 2. Journal of the Academy of Natural Sciences of Philadelphia 3(2), 238–281. (BHL link)
- Say, T. 1824. Descriptions of Coleopterous insects. Part 3. Journal of the Academy of Natural Sciences of Philadelphia 3(2), 298–330. (BHL link)
- Say, T. 1824. Descriptions of Coleopterous insects. Part 4. Journal of the Academy of Natural Sciences of Philadelphia 3(2), 403–462. (BHL link)
- Say, T. 1824. Descriptions of Coleopterous insects, collected in the late expedition to the Rocky Mountains. Part 1. Journal of the Academy of Natural Sciences of Philadelphia 4(1), 83–99. (BHL link)
- Say, T. 1824. An account of some of the fossil shells of Maryland. Journal of the Academy of Natural Sciences of Philadelphia 4(1), 124–154. (BHL link)
- Say, T. 1825. On the fresh water and land Tortoises of the United States. Journal of the Academy of Natural Sciences of Philadelphia 4(2), 203–219. (BHL link)
- Say, T. 1825. Description of three new species of Coluber, inhabiting the United States. Journal of the Academy of Natural Sciences of Philadelphia 4(2), 237–241. (BHL link)
- Say, T. 1825. On two genera and several species of Crinoidea. Journal of the Academy of Natural Sciences of Philadelphia 4(2), 289–295. (BHL link)
- Say, T. 1825. Descriptions of new Hemipterous insects, collected in the expedition to the Rocky Mountains, performed by order of Mr. Calhoun, Secretary of War, under command of Major Long. Journal of the Academy of Natural Sciences of Philadelphia 4(2), 307–344. (BHL link)
- Say, T., and G. Ord. 1825. Description of a new species of Mammalia, whereon a genus is supposed to be founded. Journal of the Academy of Natural Sciences of Philadelphia 4(2), 352–355. (BHL link)
- Say, T. 1825. Descriptions of new species of Hister and Hololepta, inhabiting the United States. Journal of the Academy of Natural Sciences of Philadelphia 5(1), 32–47. (BHL link)
- Say, T. 1825. Descriptions of some new species of fresh water and land shells, inhabiting the United States. Journal of the Academy of Natural Sciences of Philadelphia 5(1), 119–131. (BHL link)
- Say, T. 1825. On the species of the Linnaean genus Asterias, inhabiting the coast of the United States. Journal of the Academy of Natural Sciences of Philadelphia 5(1), 141–153. (BHL link)
- Say, T. 1825. Descriptions of new species of Coleopterous insects inhabiting the United States. Part 1. Journal of the Academy of Natural Sciences of Philadelphia 5(1), 160–204. (BHL link)
- Say, T. 1827. Descriptions of marine shells, recently discovered on the coast of the United States. Journal of the Academy of Natural Sciences of Philadelphia 5(2), 207–220. (BHL link)
- Say, T. 1827. On the species of the Linnaean genus Echinus, inhabiting the coast of the United States. Journal of the Academy of Natural Sciences of Philadelphia 5(2), 225–228. (BHL link)
- Say, T. 1827. Descriptions of new species of Coleopterous insects inhabiting the United States. Part 2. Journal of the Academy of Natural Sciences of Philadelphia 5(2), 237–283. (BHL link)
- Say, T. 1827. Descriptions of new species of Coleopterous insects inhabiting the United States. Part 3. Journal of the Academy of Natural Sciences of Philadelphia 5(2), 293–316. (BHL link)
- Say, T. 1829. Description of new Dipterous insects of the United States. Journal of the Academy of Natural Sciences of Philadelphia 6(1), 149–178. (BHL link)
- Say, T. 1830. Description of North American Dipterous insects. Journal of the Academy of Natural Sciences of Philadelphia 6(2), 183–188. (BHL link)
- Say, T. 1830. Description of new North American Hemipterous insects. Part 1. Journal of the Academy of Natural Sciences of Philadelphia 6(2), 235–244. (BHL link)
- Say, T. 1830. Description of new North American Hemipterous insects. Part 2. Journal of the Academy of Natural Sciences of Philadelphia 6(2), 299–314. (BHL link)

== See also ==
Frederick Valentine Melsheimer, also considered the "Father of Entomology"
