= Ovate clubshell =

Conservation status
- Endangered (ESA)

Scientific classification
- Kingdom: Animalia
- Phylum: Mollusca
- Class: Bivalvia
- Order: Unionida
- Family: Unionidae
- Genus: Pleurobema
- Species: P. perovatum

Binomial name
- Pleurobema perovatum (Conrad, 1834)
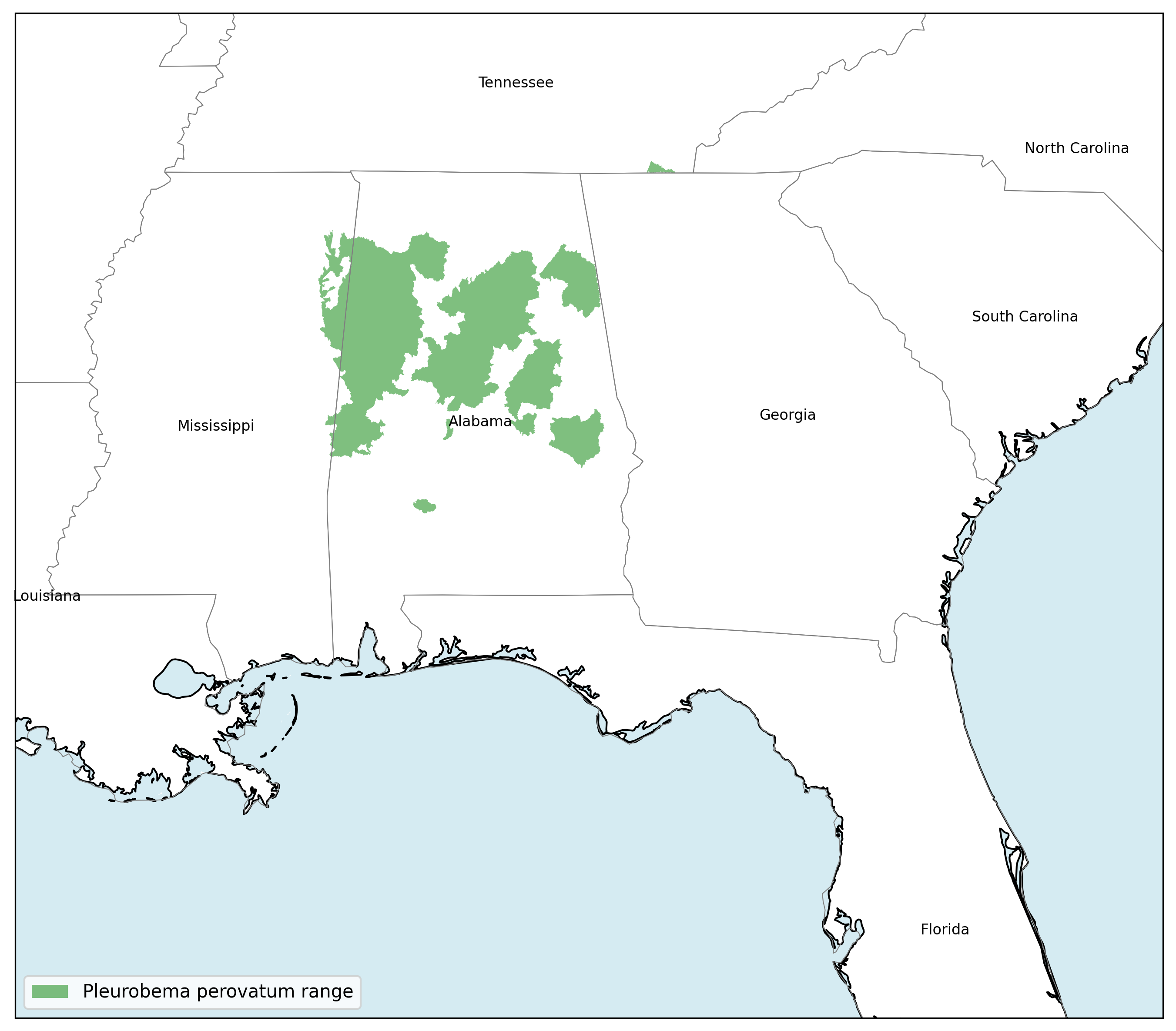

Extinct species of bivalve

The ovate clubshell (Pleurobema perovatum) is a species of freshwater mussel, an aquatic bivalve within the family of Unionidae.

This species is endemic to the Mobile River Basin in Alabama and Mississippi.

== Current Status ==
The species was listed as extinct by the IUCN in 2012, stating that no specimens had been recorded since the early 20th century. This contradicts publications from the US Fish and Wildlife Service which cite recordings from the 1980s and 90s. In 2008, populations were known in the Sipsey River, and in 2015 at least 13 sites were known, including a "healthy, reproducing" population in Wilson Creek.

== Taxonomy ==
The species was first described by Timothy Abbott Conrad in 1834.

A DNA study showed that some specimens of P. perovatum were Pleurobema hanleyianum, which was previously thought extinct.

== Etymology ==
The genus name Pleurobema comes from the Greek "side" and "step", referring to the well-defined posterior ridge. The species name perovatum means "very oval".

== Description ==
The ovate clubshell is an oval or elliptical mussel that is around 5 cm (2 in) in length. The umbo is inflated, and the posterior ridge is well-developed. The shell color is yellow to dark brown, sometimes with broad green rays. The nacre is white to bluish-white.

== Habitat and Ecology ==
The species prefers sand and gravel substrates in riffles, runs, and shoals of creeks and rivers.

Females are gravid (pregnant) in June to July. The species, like most freshwater mussels, requires a host fish for its parasitic larval phase. The host fish for Pleurobema perovatum have not been studied, but other members of the genus use minnows in the Cyprinidae family.

== Conservation ==
The species was listed as Endangered under the Endangered Species Act in 1993, due to habitat alteration by dams and water pollution. In 2019, it was noted that the species' numbers had slightly improved, but populations were still small. Further study was needed on the habitat and ecology of the species.
