= Annie Law =

British-American conchologist

- Born: 1842; Carlisle, England
- Died: 12 January 1889 (aged 46–47); Watsonville, California
- Scientific career
- Fields: Conchology

Annie Elisabeth Law (1842–12 January 1889) was a British-American conchologist, who discovered 11 species and one genus of mollusks, but did not publish formal descriptions of them. She was also a dispatch rider for the Confederate army during the American Civil War and was tried in Knoxville as a confederate informer.

== Personal life ==
Annie Law was born in 1842 in Carlisle, England, the first of three children of John Law. The family migrated to the United States in around 1850, settling in Maryville, Blount County, Tennessee.

Annie Law taught school in Jalapa, Tennessee, from about 1871 to 1872.

After her parents had died, in 1874, Law spent time in California, including four years in Hollister, San Benito County. While residing in Hollister Law visited Blount County and collected ethnological artefacts from a native American burial mound. These she donated to the Smithsonian Institution. Law collected mollusks, and discovered 11 new species and one new genus of mollusks, but did not publish formal descriptions of them. Law later resided at Watsonville, Santa Cruz County, where she died on 12 January 1889.

Law was also a dispatch rider for the Confederate army during the American Civil War. On 4 June 1864 she was arrested in Knoxville, and was tried there as a confederate informer.

== Conchology ==
Law collected specimens in the mountainous regions of North Carolina and Tennessee. She corresponded with James Lewis, who published a paper describing her finds in the Holston River, and other papers formally describing the species she discovered. Species she discovered include the following, two of which were named in her honor:

- Appalachina chilhoweensis, previously known as Helix chilhoweensis (Lewis, 1874)
- Helix lawii now known as Praticolella lawae (Lewis, 1874)
- Pleurobema oviforme (Conrad, 1834), previously known as Unio lawi Lea, 1871
- Vitrizonites latissima, previously known as Vitrina latissima (J. Lewis, 1874) on Tusquita Bald Mountain, at an altitude of 6,600 feet (2,000 m).
- Zonites acerra (Lewis, 1874)
- Zonites cerinoidea var. cuspidata (Lewis, 1875)
- Zonites lawii

== Bibliography ==
=== Sources ===
- Annual Report of the Board of Regents of the Smithsonian Institution. LCCN 04-18264; ISSN 0096-4093; OCLC 1597256 (all editions).
1. Law, Annie E. (1875). 1874: "Antiquities of Blount County, Tennessee". p. 375.
  1. Via Internet Archive.
  2. Via Biodiversity Library.
- Maryville College Monthly.
1. Branner, John Casper (1850–1922) (December 1908). "Annie Law and Fannie Law Andrews". Vol. 11, no. 2.
  1. Via Online Archive of California (OAC) (Dr. James Lewis; 1822–1881, lived in Mohawk, New York). James Lewis Letters, M0108, Department of Special Collections, Stanford University Libraries.
