= Pleurobema marshalli =

Conservation status
- Critically Endangered (IUCN 2.3)

- Extinct (ESA)

Scientific classification
- Kingdom: Animalia
- Phylum: Mollusca
- Class: Bivalvia
- Order: Unionida
- Family: Unionidae
- Genus: Pleurobema
- Species: P. marshalli

Binomial name
- Pleurobema marshalli Frierson, 1927

Species of bivalve

Pleurobema marshalli, the flat pigtoe or Marshall's mussel, was a species of freshwater mussel in the family Unionidae, the river mussels. It was native to Alabama and Mississippi, but it has not been seen since 1980. Though it is still listed as critically endangered on the IUCN Red List and as an endangered species on the US Endangered Species List, it is likely extinct.

This mussel was last seen in a stretch of the Tombigbee River before the habitat was destroyed by the installation of the Tennessee-Tombigbee Waterway. No living or freshly dead specimens have been seen since.

The US Fish and Wildlife Service press release in September 2021 formally proposed the species be delisted from the Endangered Species Act due to extinction, it was officially delisted on October 16, 2023.
