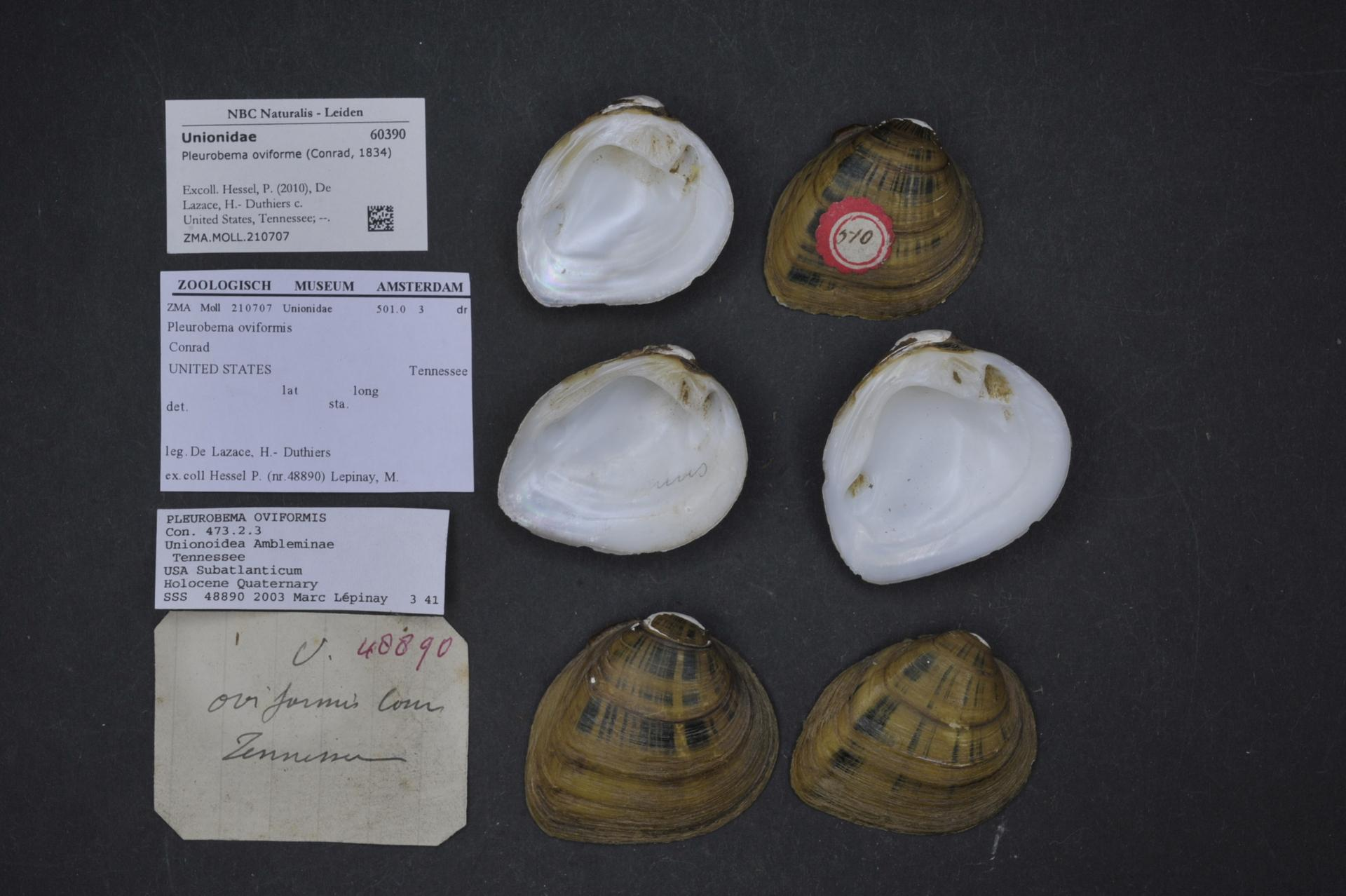

Conservation status
- Vulnerable (IUCN 2.3)

- Imperiled (NatureServe)

Scientific classification
- Kingdom: Animalia
- Phylum: Mollusca
- Class: Bivalvia
- Order: Unionida
- Family: Unionidae
- Genus: Pleurobema
- Species: P. oviforme

Binomial name
- Pleurobema oviforme (Conrad, 1834)

Synonyms
- Unio oviformis Conrad, 1834; Unio ravenelianus Lea, 1834; Unio rudis Conrad, 1837; Unio patulus Conrad, 1838; Unio holstonensis Lea, 1840; Unio argenteus Lea, 1841; Unio decisus Küster, 1852; Unio mundus Lea, 1857; Unio lesleyi Lea, 1860; Unio tesserulae Lea, 1862; Unio striatissimus J.G. Anthony, 1865; Unio clinchensis Lea, 1867; Unio planior Lea, 1868; Unio pattinoides Lea, 1871; Unio acuens Lea, 1871; Unio lawi Lea, 1871; Unio bellulus Lea, 1872; Unio brevis Lea, 1872; Unio conasaugaensis Lea, 1872; Unio clavus Call, 1885; Unio accuens Paetel, 1890; Unio swordianus S.H. Wright, 1897; Pleurobema swordiana Simpson, 1900; Pleurobema fassinans Ortmann, 1913

= Pleurobema oviforme =

Species of bivalve

Pleurobema oviforme, the Tennessee clubshell, is a species of freshwater mussel in the family Unionidae, the river mussels. It is native to the eastern United States, where it occurs in Alabama, Kentucky, North Carolina, Tennessee, and Virginia. It also previously occurred in Mississippi.

This is a mussel of medium size which is variable in appearance. It may be compressed or inflated and any of various shapes from squarish to oval. The shell may be yellowish to greenish or brownish, sometimes with greenish rays. The inner surface of the shell is white to silvery with some iridescence. There are different morphs across populations.

Several fish species act as hosts for the glochidia of this mussel, including the central stoneroller (Campostoma anomalum), river chub (Nocomis micropogon), common shiner (Luxilus cornutus), whitetail shiner (Cyprinella galactura), Tennessee shiner (Notropis leuciodus), telescope shiner (Notropis telescopus), and fantail darter (Etheostoma flabellare).

This species formerly occupied much of the Tennessee River system, where it was a common species. Its habitat is now fragmented and it now has a disjunct distribution in several river systems in the area, and it is absent from much of its former range. All of the remaining populations are considered threatened. They are impacted by channel alteration, dam flows, siltation, development, commercial clam harvesting, loss of the fish species that host its glochidia, and water pollution from several sources, such as mine tailings. As of 2023, it is under review for listing under the Endangered Species Act of 1973.

One of the species' synonyms, Unio lawi (Lea, 1871) was in honor of the conchologist Annie Law.
