= Pleurobema taitianum =

Conservation status
- Endangered (IUCN 3.1)

- Critically Imperiled (NatureServe)

Scientific classification
- Kingdom: Animalia
- Phylum: Mollusca
- Class: Bivalvia
- Order: Unionida
- Family: Unionidae
- Genus: Pleurobema
- Species: P. taitianum

Binomial name
- Pleurobema taitianum (I. Lea, 1834)

Synonyms
- Margarita (Unio) taitianus (I. Lea, 1834); Margaron (Unio) taitianus (I. Lea, 1834); Pleurobema aldrichi Frierson, 1927; Pleurobema tombigbeanum Frierson, 1908; Unio tahetianus (I. Lea, 1834); Unio taitianus I. Lea, 1834

Species of bivalve

Pleurobema taitianum, the heavy pigtoe or Judge Tait's mussel, is a species of freshwater mussel, an aquatic bivalve mollusk in the family Unionidae, the river mussels.

This species is endemic to the United States. Previously found in the Tombigbee, Alabama, Coosa and Cahaba and possibly the Black Warrior rivers, it is now found only in the Alabama/Coosa River. It may already be extinct, as no evidence of recruitment was found in a 2010 survey. It is a federally endangered species under the Endangered Species Act of 1973. It received federal protection in 1987 after construction of the Tennessee–Tombigbee Waterway isolated it in a bypassed meander of the Tombigbee River. At the time it was also believed to survive in the Buttahatchie, East Fork Tombigbee and Sipsey rivers, all tributaries of the Tombigbee. It was threatened in the East Fork Tombigbee by total diversion of its Bull Mountain Creek tributary into a warm-water canal, likely altering East Fork water temperature, and in the others by various U.S. Army Corps of Engineers improvement projects.
