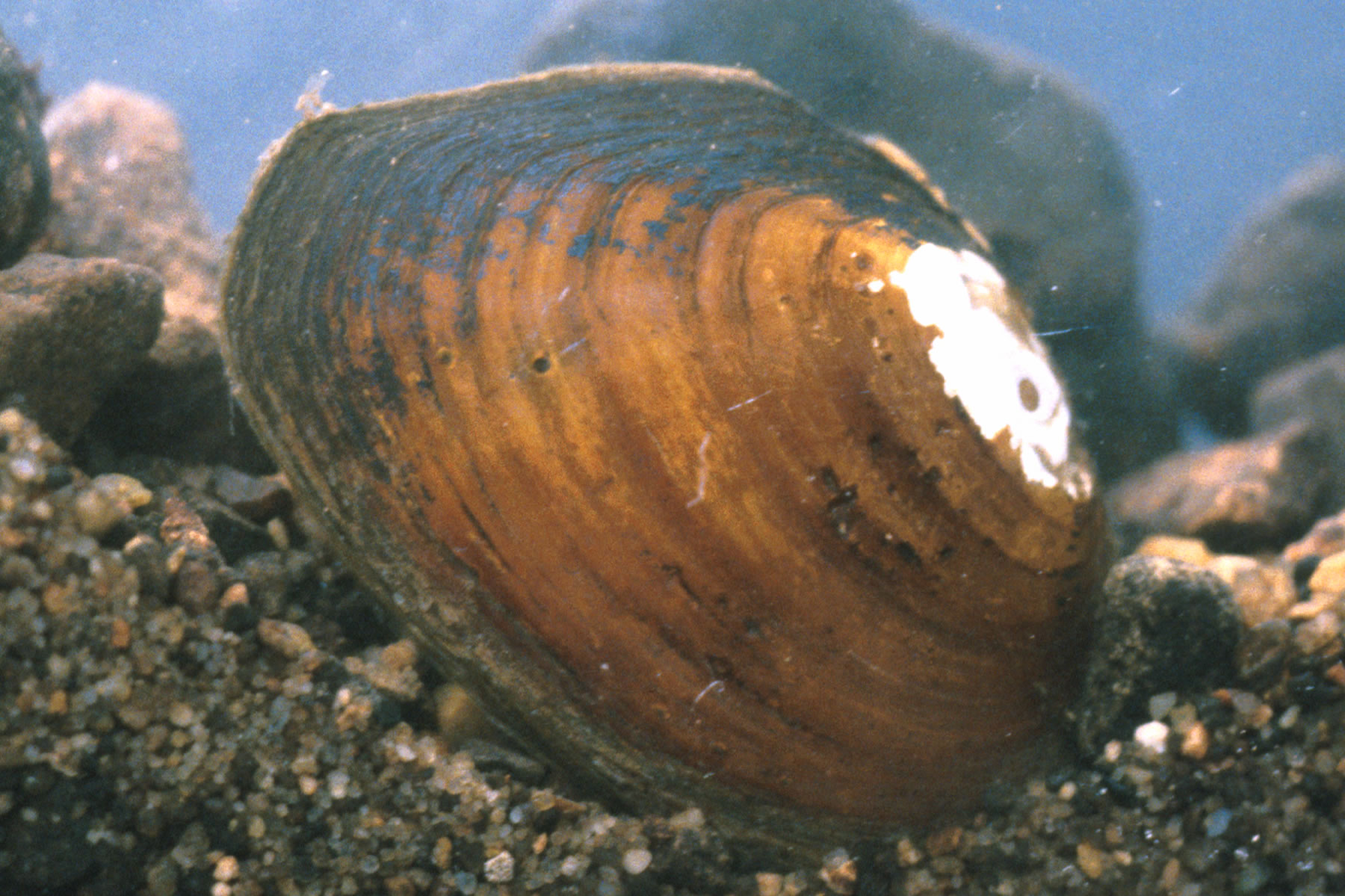
- A live individual of Pleurobema gibberum

Scientific classification
- Domain: Eukaryota
- Kingdom: Animalia
- Phylum: Mollusca
- Class: Bivalvia
- Order: Unionida
- Family: Unionidae
- Tribe: Pleurobemini
- Genus: Pleurobema; Rafinesque, 1819

= Pleurobema =

Genus of bivalves

Pleurobema is a genus of freshwater mussels, aquatic bivalve mollusks in the family Unionidae, the river mussels.

== Species ==
Species within the genus Pleurobema include:

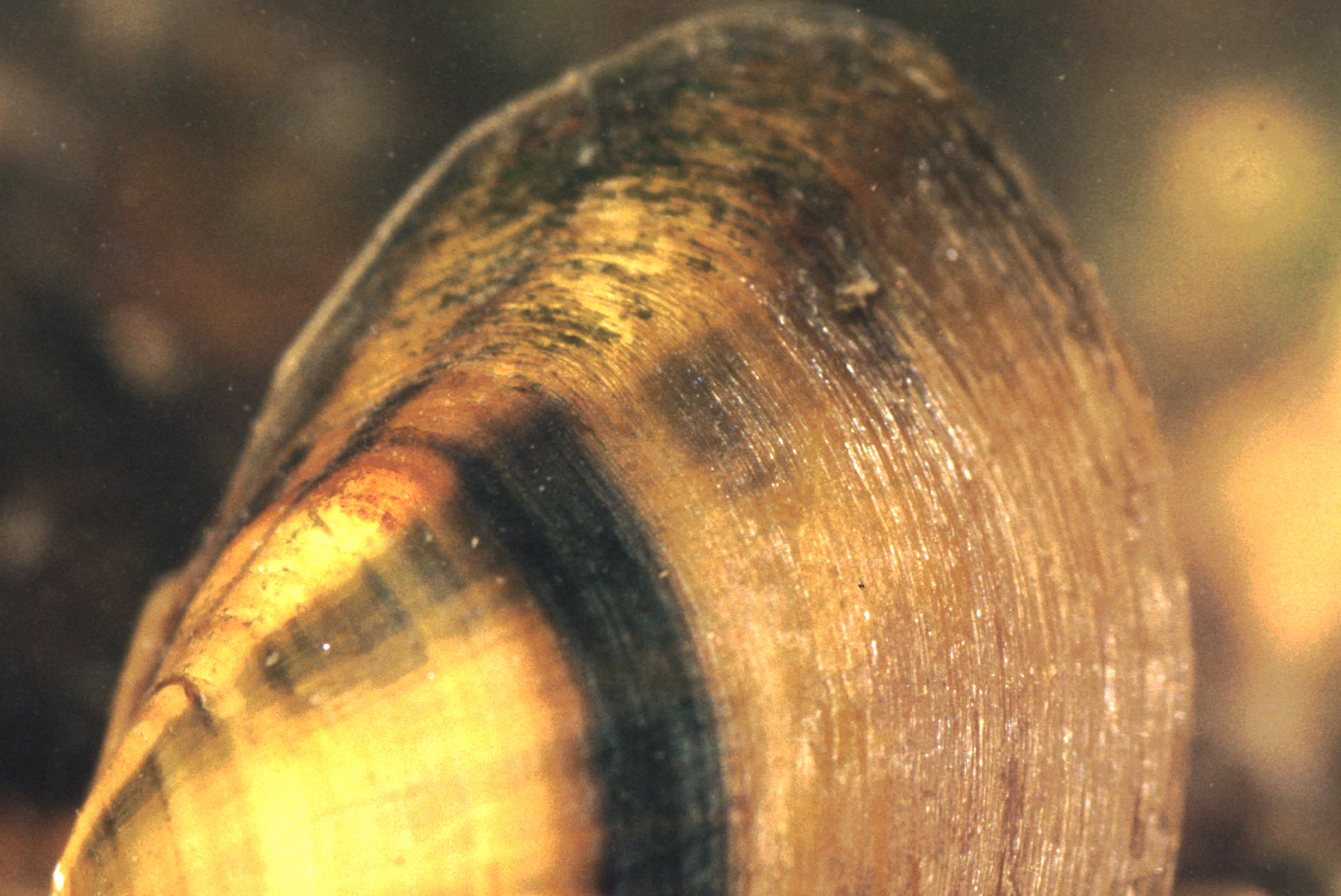
A close-up of Pleurobema decisum

- Pleurobema altum (Highnut)
- Pleurobema avellanum (Hazel pigtoe)
- Pleurobema beadleianum (Mississippi pigtoe)
- Pleurobema bournianum (Scioto pigtoe)
- Pleurobema chattanoogaense (Painted clubshell)
- Pleurobema clava (Club naiad)
- Pleurobema collina (James River spinymussel)
- Pleurobema cordatum (Ohio pigtoe)
- Pleurobema curtum (Black clubshell)
- Pleurobema decisum (Southern clubshell)
- Pleurobema flavidulum (Yellow pigtoe)
- Pleurobema furvum (Dark pigtoe)
- Pleurobema georgianum (Southern pigtoe)
- Pleurobema gibberum (Cumberland pigtoe)
- Pleurobema hagleri (Brown pigtoe)
- Pleurobema hanleyianum (Georgia pigtoe)
- Pleurobema hartmanianum (Cherokee pigtoe)
- Pleurobema johannis (Alabama pigtoe)
- Pleurobema marshalli (Flat pigtoe)
- Pleurobema nucleopsis (Longnut)
- Pleurobema oviforme (Tennessee clubshell)
- Pleurobema perovatum (Ovate clubshell)
- Pleurobema plenum (Rough pigtoe pearly mussel)
- Pleurobema pyriforme (Oval pigtoe)
- Pleurobema riddellii (Louisiana pigtoe)
- Pleurobema rubrum (Pyramid pigtoe)
- Pleurobema sintoxia (Round pigtoe)
- Pleurobema stabile (Coosa pigtoe)
- Pleurobema strodeanum (Fuzzy pigtoe)
- Pleurobema taitianum (Heavy pigtoe)
- Pleurobema troschelianum (Alabama clubshell)
- Pleurobema verum (True pigtoe)
