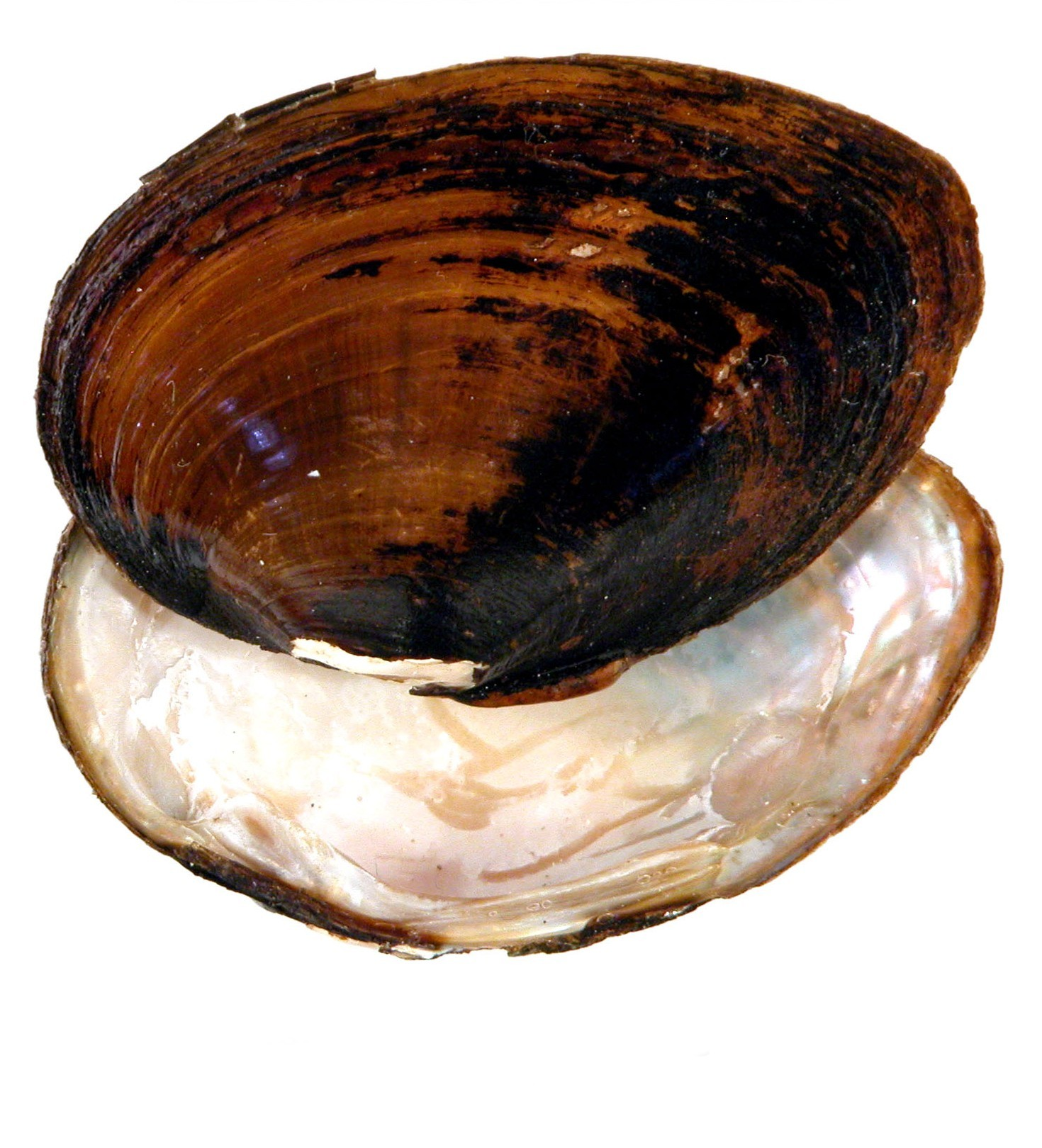

Conservation status
- Endangered (IUCN 3.1)

- Imperiled (NatureServe)

Scientific classification
- Kingdom: Animalia
- Phylum: Mollusca
- Class: Bivalvia
- Order: Unionida
- Family: Unionidae
- Genus: Pleurobema
- Species: P. pyriforme

Binomial name
- Pleurobema pyriforme (I. Lea, 1857)

= Oval pigtoe =

Species of bivalve

The oval pigtoe (Pleurobema pyriforme) is a federally endangered species of freshwater mussel, an aquatic bivalve mollusk in the family Unionidae, the river mussels.

This species is endemic to the United States in the states of Georgia, Florida, and Alabama .

The oval pigtoe was originally described from the Chattahoochee River near Columbus, Georgia. Historically, this mussel was very abundant in the Flint River in Georgia, the Chattahoochee River in Georgia and Alabama, the Chipola River in Alabama and Florida, the Ochlockonee River in Georgia and Florida, the Apalachicola River and Suwanee/Santa Fe Rivers in Florida, and Econfina Creek in Florida. However, the populations in all river systems have declined significantly due to land use changes, development, and the construction of dams.
