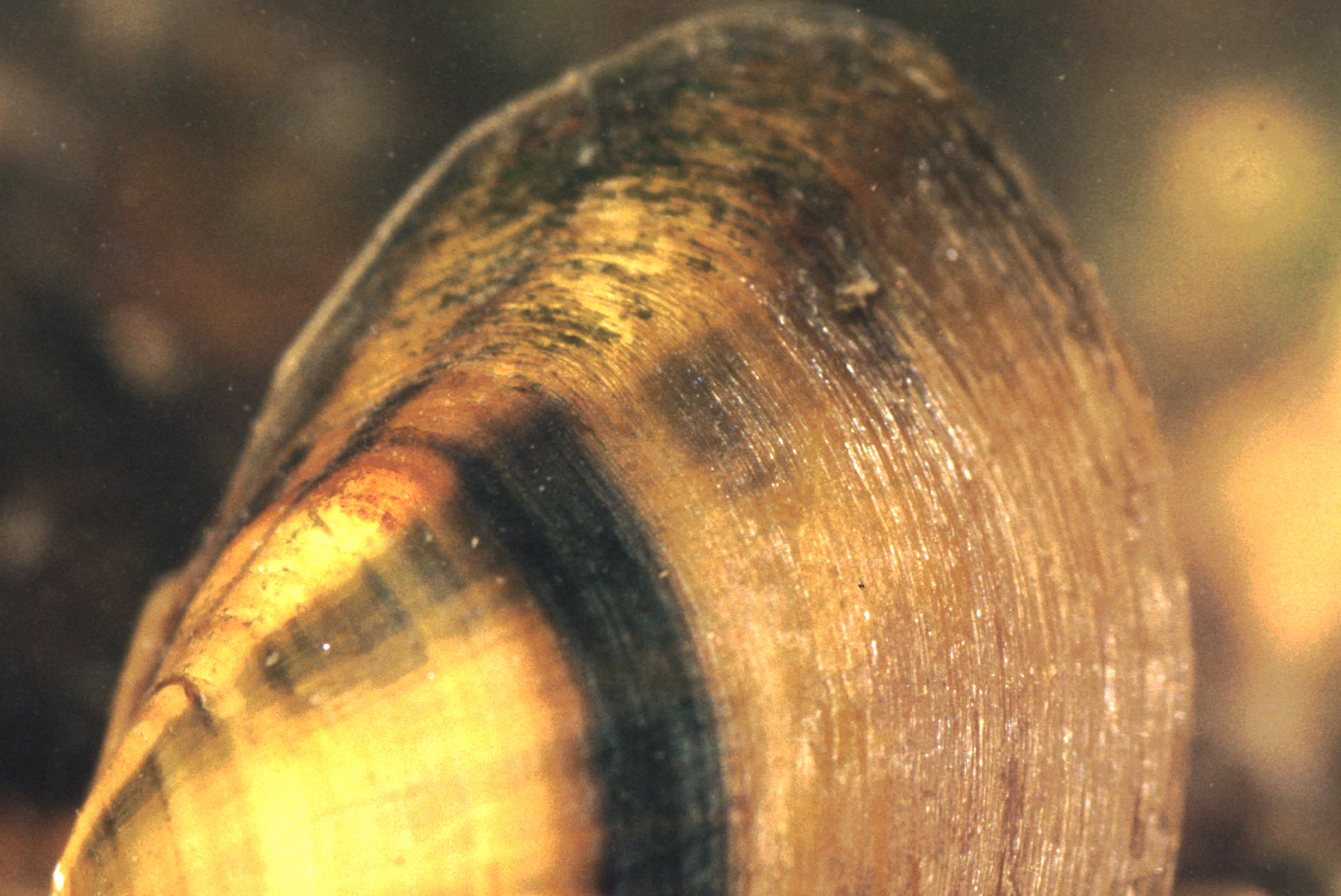

Conservation status
- Endangered (IUCN 3.1)

- Vulnerable (NatureServe)

Scientific classification
- Kingdom: Animalia
- Phylum: Mollusca
- Class: Bivalvia
- Order: Unionida
- Family: Unionidae
- Genus: Pleurobema
- Species: P. decisum

Binomial name
- Pleurobema decisum (I. Lea, 1831)

= Pleurobema decisum =

Species of bivalve

Pleurobema decisum, the southern clubshell, is a species of freshwater mussel, an aquatic bivalve mollusk in the family Unionidae, the river mussels.

This species is endemic to the United States. Its natural habitat is rivers. It is threatened by habitat loss. The species natural habitat is in Mississippi, Alabama, and Georgia (U.S. state).
