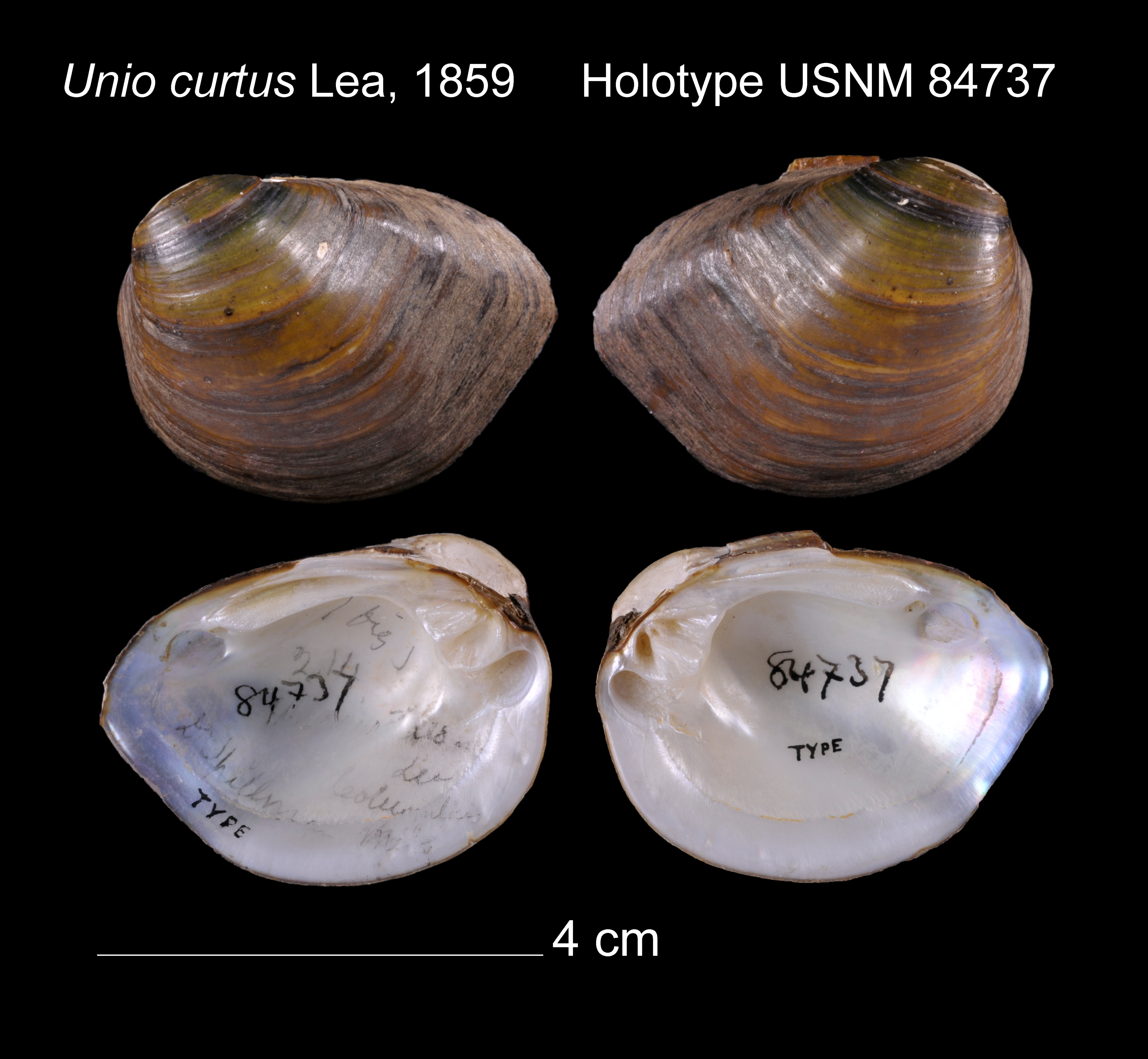

Conservation status
- Critically endangered, possibly extinct (IUCN 3.1)

- Possibly Extinct (NatureServe)

Scientific classification
- Kingdom: Animalia
- Phylum: Mollusca
- Class: Bivalvia
- Order: Unionida
- Family: Unionidae
- Genus: Pleurobema
- Species: P. curtum

Binomial name
- Pleurobema curtum (I. Lea, 1859)

Synonyms
- Unio curtus I. Lea, 1859

= Pleurobema curtum =

Species of mollusc

Pleurobema curtum, the black clubshell or Curtus's mussel, is a species of freshwater mussel, an aquatic bivalve mollusk in the family Unionidae, the river mussels. It is a federally listed endangered species.

This species is endemic to the United States, and historically occurred in the Tombigbee River in Alabama and Mississippi. At the time of its endangered listing in 1987, only two live individuals were known to have been ever collected, and populations were limited to the East Fork.

It is a small mussel usually around 50 millimetres (2.0 in) long, subtriangular in shape, and inflated in front. Younger shells are green, while older ones are a dark greenish-brown.

The species was likely adversely affected by impoundments on the Tombigbee River and construction of the Tennessee-Tombigbee Waterway in 1985, which altered water flow, increased siltation, and disturbed habitat by dredging. No living specimens have been found since construction of the waterway. Fresh dead shells were found in 1997 on a single shoal in the East Fork Tombigbee River in Itawamba County, Mississippi, and further surveys have been unsuccessful. As of the latest 5-year review by US Fish and Wildlife Service in 2021, no recent searches had been made, and it is possible the species still persists.
