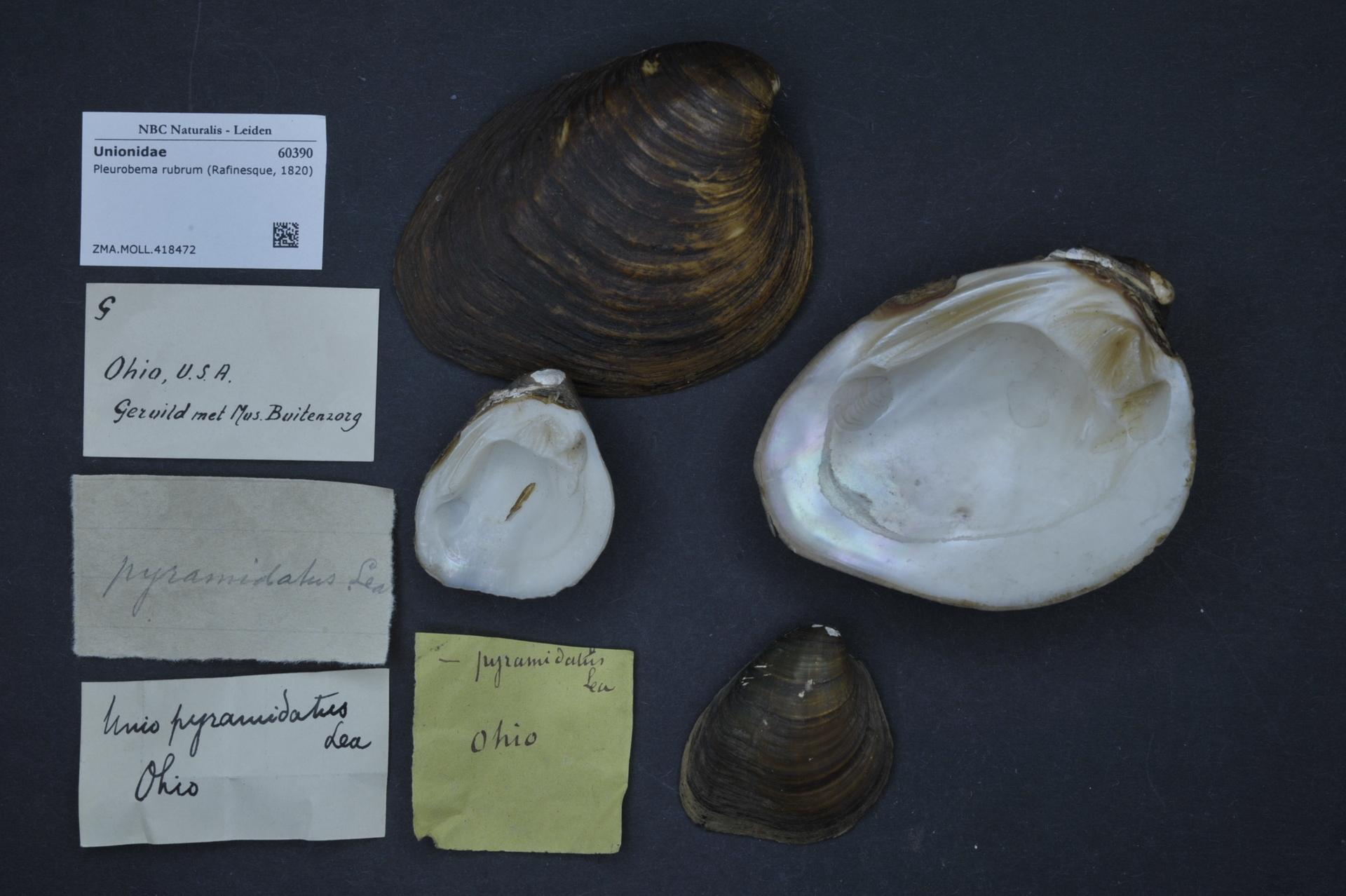

Conservation status
- Near Threatened (IUCN 2.3)

Scientific classification
- Kingdom: Animalia
- Phylum: Mollusca
- Class: Bivalvia
- Order: Unionida
- Family: Unionidae
- Genus: Pleurobema
- Species: P. rubrum

Binomial name
- Pleurobema rubrum Rafinesque, 1820

= Pleurobema rubrum =

Species of bivalve

Pleurobema rubrum, the pyramid pigtoe, is a species of freshwater mussel, an aquatic bivalve mollusk in the family Unionidae, the river mussels.

This species is endemic to the United States. Its habitat is in medium to large rivers in sand or gravel. Specimens are generally 4 inches (10 cm) long with a chestnut, thick shell.
