= Pleurobema verum =

Conservation status
- Extinct (IUCN 2.3)

- Presumed Extinct (NatureServe)

Scientific classification
- Kingdom: Animalia
- Phylum: Mollusca
- Class: Bivalvia
- Order: Unionida
- Family: Unionidae
- Genus: Pleurobema
- Species: †P. verum

Binomial name
- †Pleurobema verum (I. Lea, 1861)

Synonyms
- Unio verus Lea, 1861; Unio instructus Lea, 1861; Margaron (Unio) verus (Lea, 1861); Margaron (Unio) instructus (Lea, 1861); Pleurobema (Pleurobema) vera (Lea, 1861); Pleurobema (Pleurobema) instructa (Lea, 1861); Pleurobema instructum (Lea, 1861)

Species of bivalve

Pleurobema verum, the true pigtoe, is an extinct species of freshwater mussel in the family Unionidae. This species was endemic to Alabama, the United States. The last records are from 1930s. It occurred in the Alabama River and Cahaba River below the Fall Line.
