= Longnut =

Conservation status
- Extinct (IUCN 2.3)

Scientific classification
- Kingdom: Animalia
- Phylum: Mollusca
- Class: Bivalvia
- Order: Unionida
- Family: Unionidae
- Genus: Pleurobema
- Species: †P. nucleopsis

Binomial name
- †Pleurobema nucleopsis (Conrad, 1849)

Extinct species of bivalve

The longnut (Pleurobema nucleopsis) was a species of freshwater mussel, an aquatic bivalve mollusk in the family Unionidae, the river mussels.

This species was endemic to the United States. Its natural habitat was rivers.
