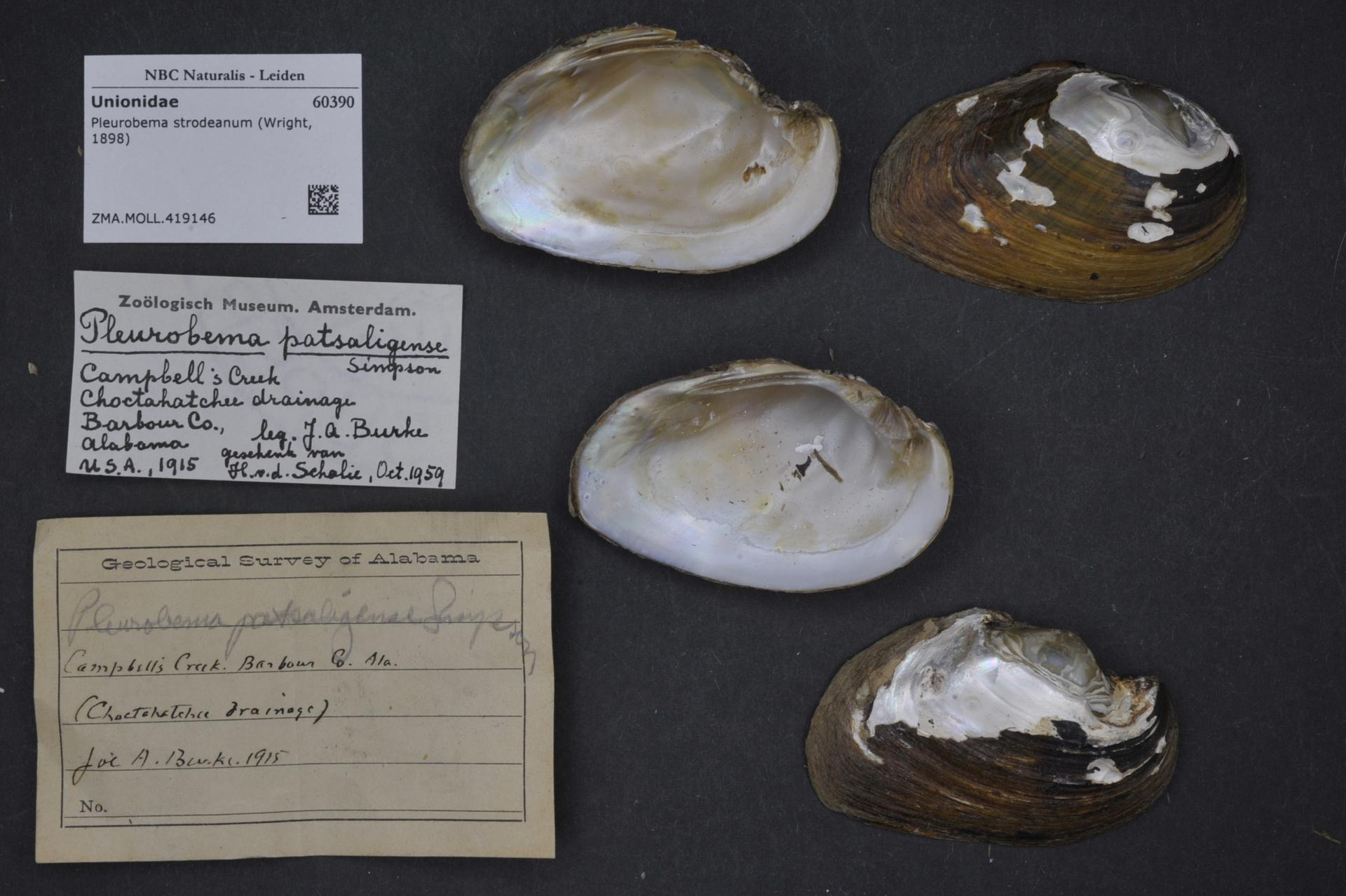

Conservation status
- Vulnerable (IUCN 2.3)

- Imperiled (NatureServe)

Scientific classification
- Kingdom: Animalia
- Phylum: Mollusca
- Class: Bivalvia
- Order: Unionida
- Family: Unionidae
- Genus: Pleurobema
- Species: P. strodeanum

Binomial name
- Pleurobema strodeanum (Wright, 1898)

= Fuzzy pigtoe =

Species of bivalve

The fuzzy pigtoe (Pleurobema strodeanum) is a species of freshwater mussel, an aquatic bivalve mollusk in the family Unionidae, the river mussels.

This species is endemic to the United States, and its natural habitat is rivers. It is threatened by habitat loss.

According to a study done in 2013, "Changes in length, width, and height of a shell over time are commonly used for determining rates of growth in mussels...over a period of seven years, p. strodeanum grew 0.48 mm/year in length". These rates and the differences in morphology of the shell are indicators of changes in the environment.
