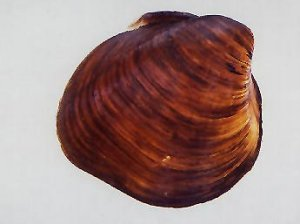

Conservation status
- Critically Endangered (IUCN 2.3)
- CITES Appendix I (CITES)

Scientific classification
- Kingdom: Animalia
- Phylum: Mollusca
- Class: Bivalvia
- Order: Unionida
- Family: Unionidae
- Genus: Pleurobema
- Species: P. plenum

Binomial name
- Pleurobema plenum (Lea, 1840)

= Pleurobema plenum =

Species of bivalve

Pleurobema plenum, the rough pigtoe pearly mussel or rough pigtoe, is a species of freshwater mussel, an aquatic bivalve mollusk in the family Unionidae, the river mussels.

This species is endemic to the United States.
