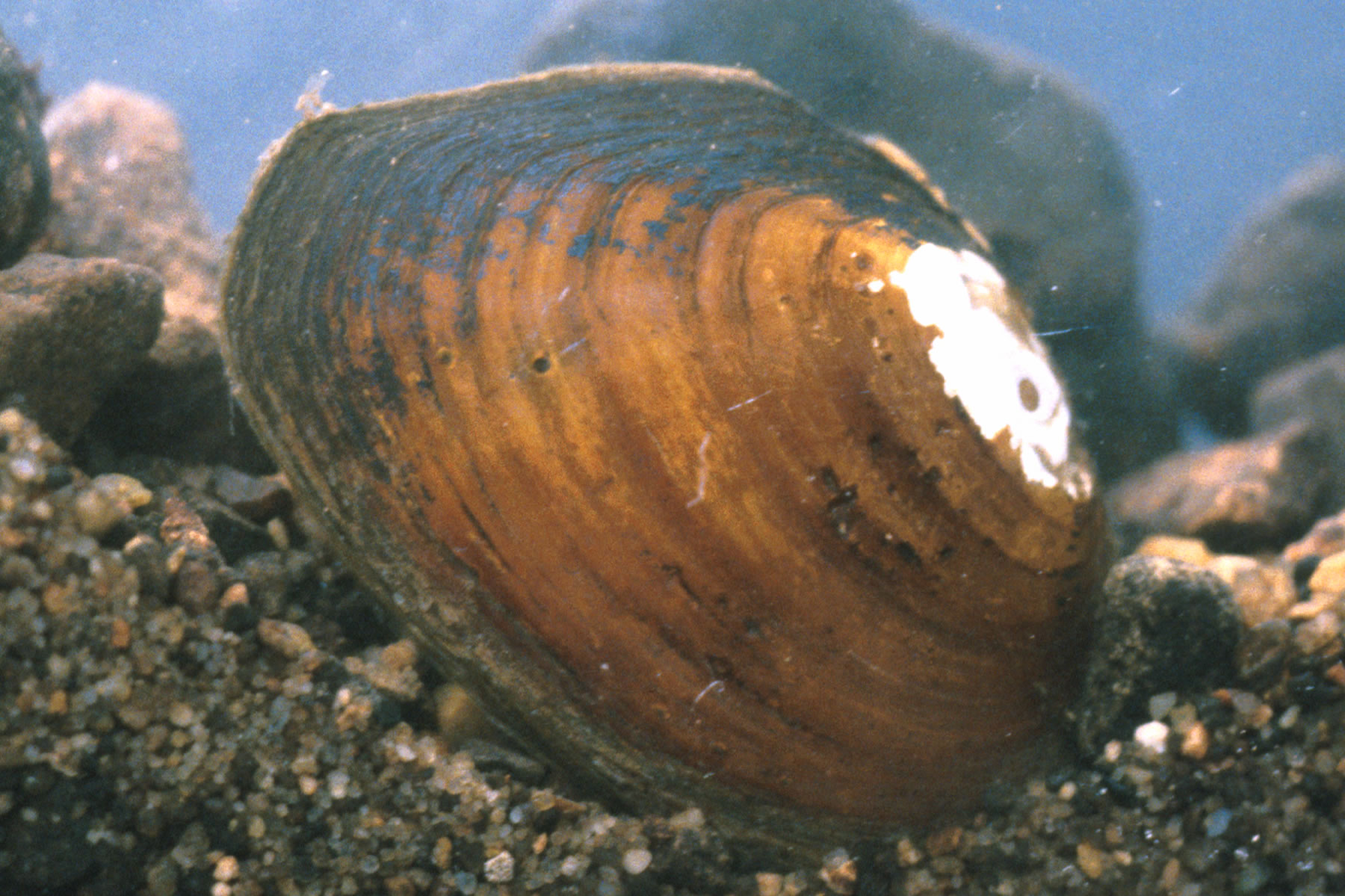

Conservation status
- Critically Endangered (IUCN 2.3)

- Endangered (ESA)

Scientific classification
- Kingdom: Animalia
- Phylum: Mollusca
- Class: Bivalvia
- Order: Unionida
- Family: Unionidae
- Genus: Pleurobema
- Species: P. gibberum

Binomial name
- Pleurobema gibberum (I. Lea, 1838)

Synonyms
- Pleuronaia gibbera (Lea, 1838); Pleuronaia gibberum (Lea, 1838); Unio gibber Lea, 1838

= Cumberland pigtoe =

Species of bivalve

The Cumberland pigtoe (Pleurobema gibberum) is a species of freshwater mussel, an aquatic bivalve mollusk in the family Unionidae, the river mussels.

== Distribution ==
This species is endemic to the United States.
