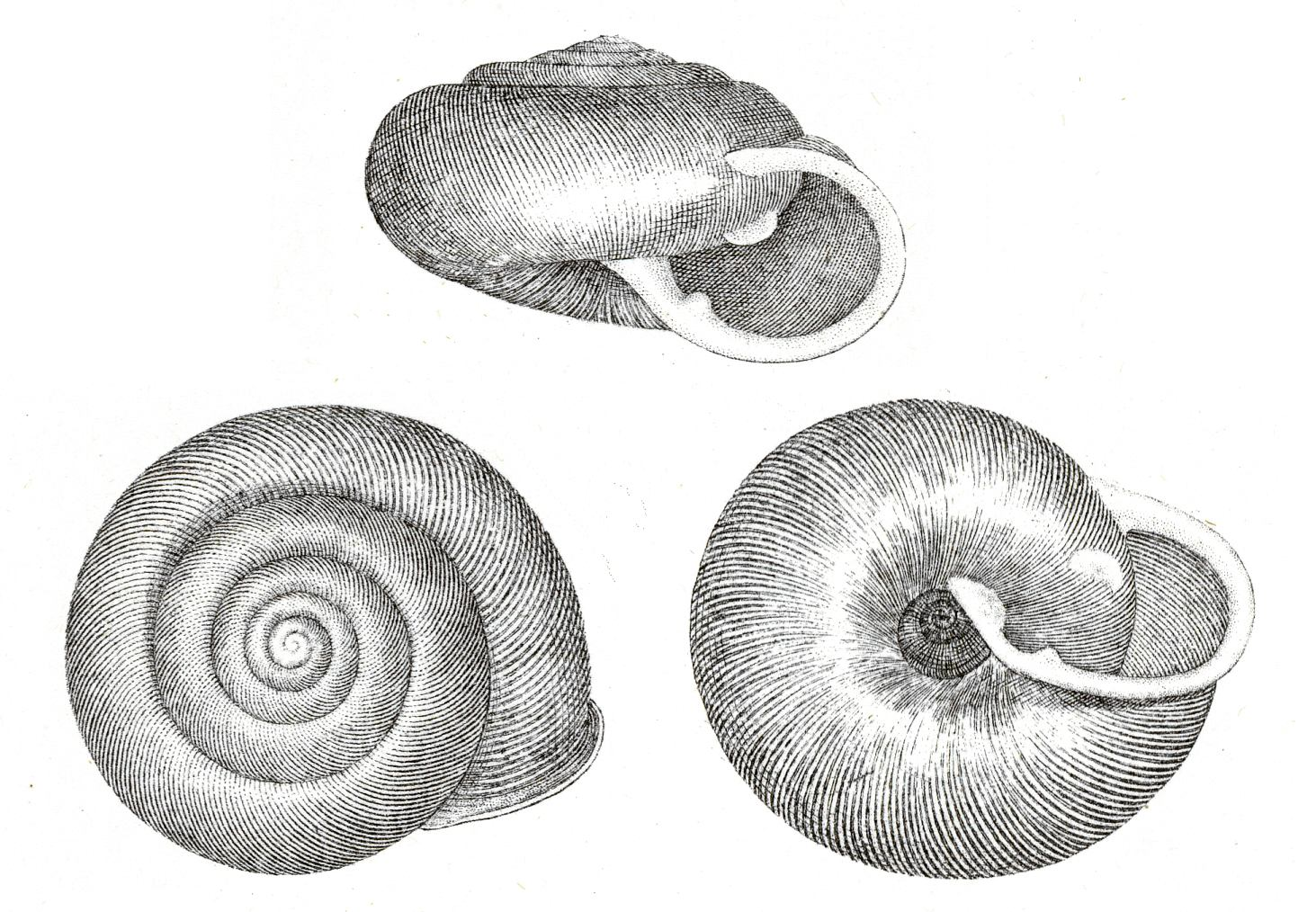
- Appalachina sayana from W. G. Binney, 1878

Scientific classification
- Kingdom: Animalia
- Phylum: Mollusca
- Class: Gastropoda
- Order: Stylommatophora
- Family: Polygyridae
- Subfamily: Triodopsinae
- Tribe: Mesodontini
- Genus: Appalachina; Pilsbry, 1940

= Appalachina =

Genus of gastropods

Appalachina is a genus of small, air-breathing, land snails, terrestrial pulmonate gastropod molluscs in the family Polygyridae.

== Taxonomy ==
Henry Augustus Pilsbry created what was then the subgenus Appalachina (under the genus Mesodon), a group of land snails in the family Polygyridae, for those snails with comparatively depressed (flat) shells and an open umbilicus (the center of the underside of the shell). The reproductive anatomy of these snails is important for distinguishing them from other polygyrids.

== Species ==
The genus Appalachina includes the following species:

- Appalachina chilhoweensis (Lewis, 1870)
- Appalachina sayana (Pilsbry, 1906)
