= Pleurobema beadleianum =

Conservation status
- Least Concern (IUCN 3.1)

- Vulnerable (NatureServe)

Scientific classification
- Kingdom: Animalia
- Phylum: Mollusca
- Class: Bivalvia
- Order: Unionida
- Family: Unionidae
- Genus: Pleurobema
- Species: P. beadleianum

Binomial name
- Pleurobema beadleianum (I. Lea, 1861)

Species of bivalve

Pleurobema beadleianum, the Mississippi pigtoe, is a species of freshwater mussel, an aquatic bivalve mollusk in the family Unionidae, the river mussels.

This species is endemic to the United States.
