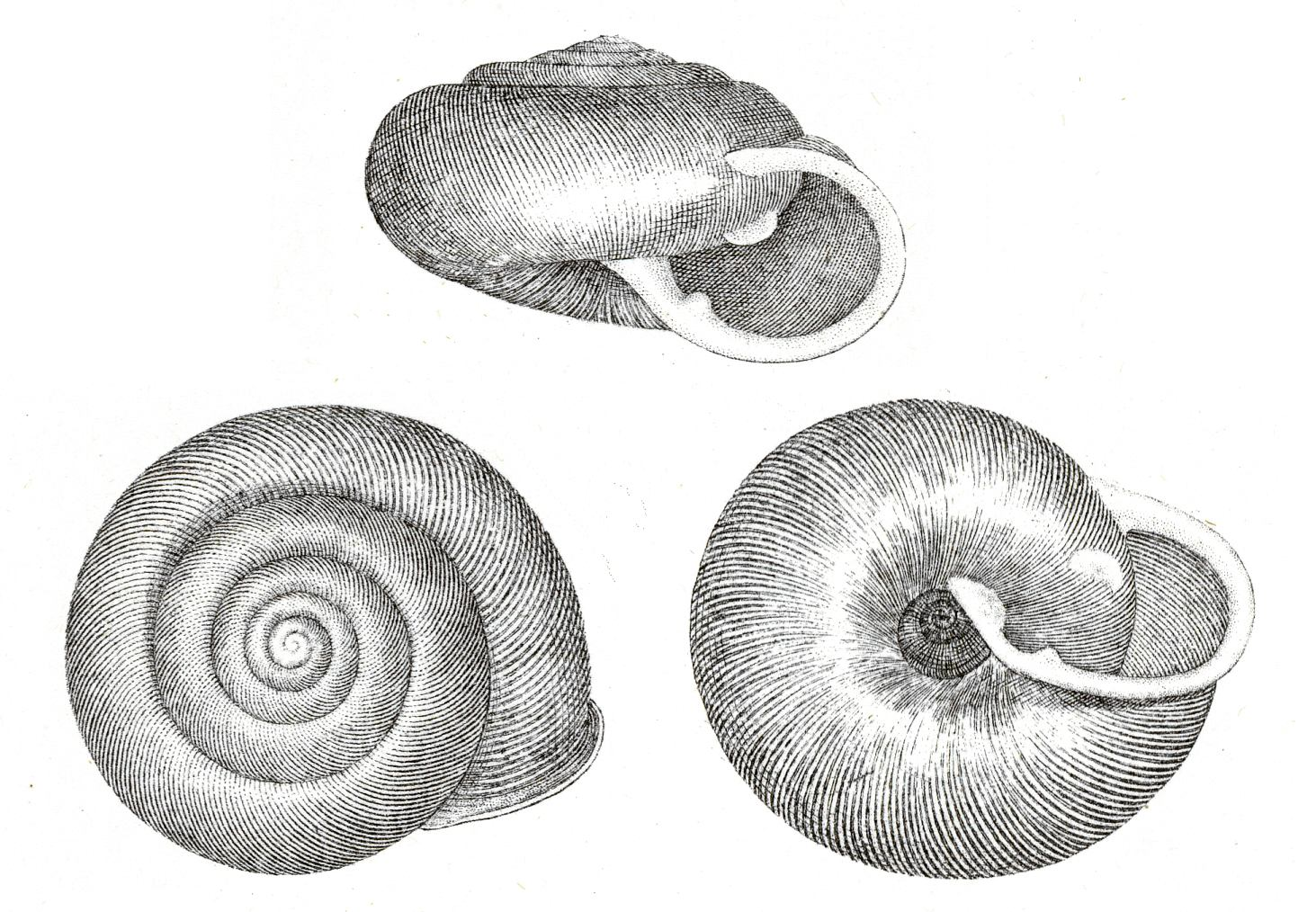
- Appalachina sayana from W. G. Binney, 1878

Conservation status
- Apparently Secure (NatureServe)

Scientific classification
- Kingdom: Animalia
- Phylum: Mollusca
- Class: Gastropoda
- Order: Stylommatophora
- Family: Polygyridae
- Genus: Appalachina
- Species: A. sayana

Binomial name
- Appalachina sayana (Pilsbry, 1906)

= Appalachina sayana =

Species of gastropod

The Appalachina sayana, also known as the spike-lip crater, is a species of small, air-breathing land snails, terrestrial pulmonate gastropod molluscs in the family Polygyridae.

== Distribution and conservation status ==
This species lives in Ontario, Quebec, New Brunswick and Nova Scotia in Canada and was assessed as not at risk by the Committee on the Status of Endangered Wildlife in Canada (COSEWIC).
