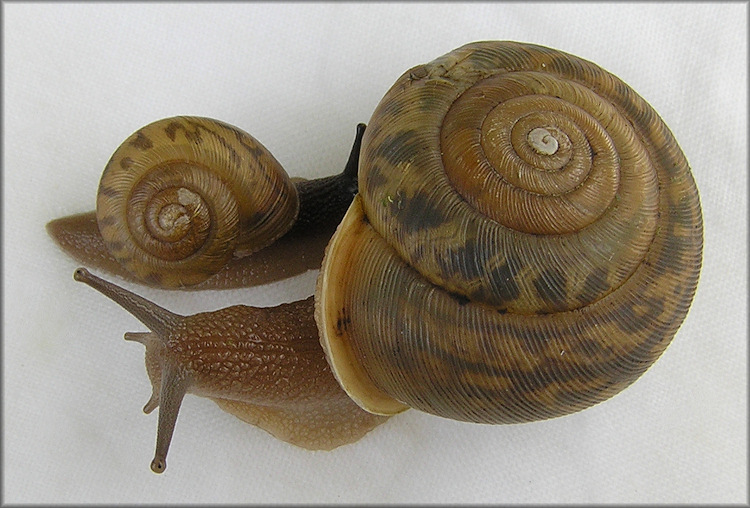
- Mature and juvenile queen craters found in Tennessee

Conservation status
- Apparently Secure (NatureServe)

Scientific classification
- Kingdom: Animalia
- Phylum: Mollusca
- Class: Gastropoda
- Order: Stylommatophora
- Family: Polygyridae
- Genus: Appalachina
- Species: A. chilhoweensis

Binomial name
- Appalachina chilhoweensis (J. Lewis, 1871)

Synonyms
- Helix chilhoweensis J. Lewis, 1871; Polygyra chilhoweensis (J. Lewis, 1871)

= Appalachina chilhoweensis =

Species of land snail

Appalachina chilhoweensis, also known as the queen crater, is a species of pulmonate land snail in the family Polygridae. It is the largest North American land snail found east of the Rocky Mountains. It is named after Chilhowee Mountain.

== Physical appearance ==
The queen crater is a large snail, with a shell ranging from 26.5 to 42 mm (1.04 to 1.65 in) in diameter. The base of the shell is yellow-brown in color, with dark-brown splotches and a pale, broad lip.

== Ecology ==
The queen crater is endemic to the southeastern United States, being found in Tennessee, Kentucky, and North Carolina. It is fairly common in Tennessee, and its populations are considered secure. However, in Kentucky and North Carolina, where the species is considerably rarer, it is listed as imperiled.

The queen crater is most commonly found in mixed upland hardwood forests, high up in the Appalachian mountains. They typically reside on wooded hillsides or slopes, under leaf litter or on or around sandstone talus. The highest elevation a queen crater has been recorded at is 1,666 meters, or 5,465.88 feet.
