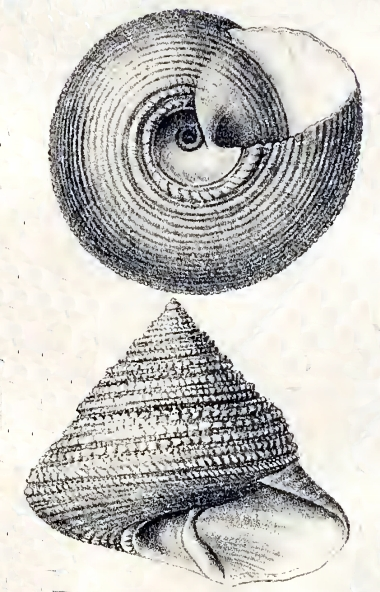
- Drawing with two views of a shell of Calliostoma sayanum

Scientific classification
- Kingdom: Animalia
- Phylum: Mollusca
- Class: Gastropoda
- Subclass: Vetigastropoda
- Order: Trochida
- Family: Calliostomatidae
- Genus: Calliostoma
- Species: C. sayanum

Binomial name
- Calliostoma sayanum Dall, 1889

Synonyms
- Calliostoma (Eutrochus) sayanum Dall, 1889

= Calliostoma sayanum =

Species of gastropod

Calliostoma sayanum, common name Say's top shell, is a species of sea snail, a marine gastropod mollusk in the family Calliostomatidae.

== Description ==
The height of the shell attains 39 mm. The umbilicated shell is large, polished, solid, and contains 8 whorls. It is straw-yellow lineated with red-brown, and has a broad rose-colored peripheral band. The walls of the umbilicus are marked with incremental lines, slightly excavated near the carina, above convex, the convexity revolving with the whorl. The convexity is straw-color, a deep brown band revolving just within the carina. The spiral sculpture outside the carina, which is not very sharp, consists of two strong beaded spirals alternating with two fine simple brown elevated lines. Then follow nine subequal, finer spirals, less coarsely beaded, the upper angle of the aperture being at the ninth. All these are straw-colored with brown interspaces. Then three fine yellow-brown undulated lines, then a larger nodulated peripheral spiral with a smaller similar one on each side of it. These and their interspaces are of a deep rose-pink. Above the pink band is the largest nodulated spiral, followed by (on the body whorl) seven or eight somewhat smaller, alternating larger and smaller, the last separated by a smooth space from the suture. These are all straws-colored with brown interspaces and an occasional intercalary fine line. The radiating sculpture consists only of faint incremental line. The nucleus is lost. The earlier whorls have three nodulated spirals. The base of the shell and the whorls are a little convex. The periphery is evenly rounded. The sutures are distinct. The aperture is ovate. The margin is simple. The columella is concavely arched with a slight angle, not to be called a tooth, formed by the end of the umbilical carina at the base. The Interior is extremely nacreous. The operculum is amber-colored, fibrous toward the edges, with twelve or more whorls, a small central elevation on the inner side.

The animal has a stout rounded muzzle, short stout tentacles and large black eyes. It has a very large anterior epipodial lobe, two lateral cirri, and two or three small ones from under the operculum. The foot is bluntly rounded before and behind. The color of the external soft part is uniform straw-color.

== Distribution ==
This species occurs in the Gulf of Mexico and in the Atlantic Ocean from North Carolina to Florida at depths between 119 m and 366 m.
