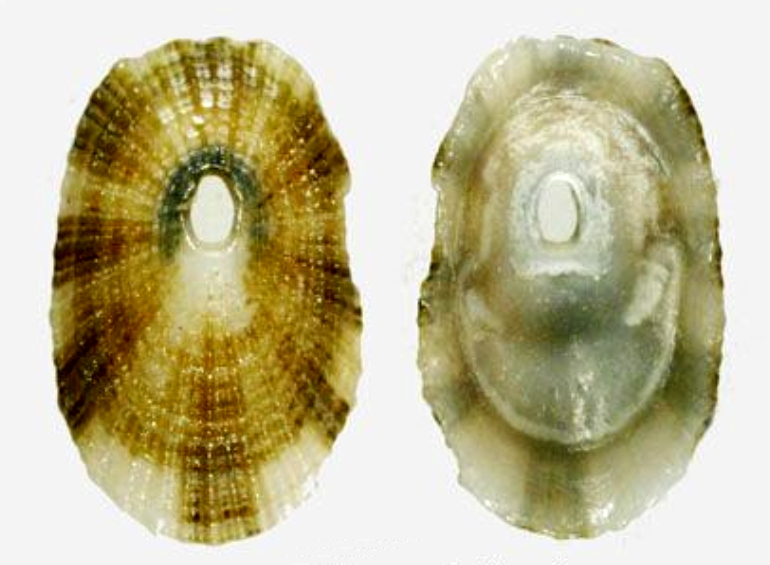
- Shell of Diodora sayi (specimen at the Natural History Museum Rotterdam)

Scientific classification
- Kingdom: Animalia
- Phylum: Mollusca
- Class: Gastropoda
- Subclass: Vetigastropoda
- Order: Lepetellida
- Family: Fissurellidae
- Genus: Diodora
- Species: D. sayi

Binomial name
- Diodora sayi (Dall, 1889)

Synonyms
- Fissurella (Cremides) alternata var. sayi Dall, 1889 superseded combination; Fissurella sayi Dall, 1889 superseded combination; Fissuridea sayi (Dall, 1889) superseded combination; Glyphis sayi (Dall, 1889) superseded combination

= Diodora sayi =

Species of gastropod

Diodora sayi is a species of sea snail, a marine gastropod mollusk in the family Fissurellidae, the keyhole limpets.

== Description ==
(Original description) The deep-water specimens of Fissurella (Cremides) alternata var. sayi (synonym of Diodora cayenensis (Lamarck, 1822) ) are generally smaller, of an olivaceous cast, and with the color rays very faint or entirely absent.

== Distribution ==
This species occurs in the Atlantic Ocean off Brazil and the Cape Verde.
