= Georgia pigtoe =

Conservation status
- Critically Endangered (IUCN 3.1)

- Critically Imperiled (NatureServe)

Scientific classification
- Kingdom: Animalia
- Phylum: Mollusca
- Class: Bivalvia
- Order: Unionida
- Family: Unionidae
- Genus: Pleurobema
- Species: P. hanleyianum

Binomial name
- Pleurobema hanleyianum (I. Lea, 1852)

Species of bivalve

The Georgia pigtoe (Pleurobema hanleyianum) is a rare species of freshwater mussel in the family Unionidae. It is native to Alabama, Georgia, and Tennessee in the United States, where it has been extirpated from most of its historical range. It was declared extinct by the IUCN, but a few living individuals were discovered persisting in the Conasauga River in Georgia and Tennessee. It was federally listed as an endangered species in 2010.
